= Flora of Estonia =

Estonia is a small, heavily forested country situated on the Baltic Sea. It is a part of the Euro-Siberian region of terrestrial Palearctic realm, and the Temperate Northern Atlantic marine ecoregion.

Phytogeographically, Estonia is shared between the Central European and Eastern European provinces of the Circumboreal Region within the Boreal Kingdom. According to the WWF, the territory of Estonia belongs to the ecoregion of Sarmatic mixed forests.

There are several plant species endemic to Estonia. These include, for example, Saaremaa yellow rattle (Rhinanthus osiliensis) and Estonian saw-wort (Saussurea esthonica). In total, there are 83 endemic taxa, mostly from the hawkweed (Hieracium) genus.

In total 1441 species of vascular plants have described, in addition more than 2500 species of algae, and 680 species of lichens.

== Vascular plants ==
The indigenous flora of Estonia includes 1441 species of vascular plants (with subspecies the number reaches 1538). The number of indigenous pteridophytes is 50, gymnosperms is 4, and angiosperms is 1387. These species belong to 113 families and 443 genera.

The largest genus is Taraxacum with 165 species, followed by Hieracium with 81, and Carex with 69 species.

== See also ==
- Fauna of Estonia
