= List of mammals of Estonia =

This list of mammals of Estonia shows the IUCN Red List status of the mammal fauna occurring in Estonia. It is somewhat impoverished compared to that of southern and central Europe due to the short period since the last ice age. Native species are considered to be those which are today present in the country. There are no endemic mammal species in Estonia. The list follows Moks et al. (2015) with later additions.

Icons which state each species' global IUCN status:
CR	Critically Endangered	In imminent risk of extinction in the wild
EN	Endangered	Facing an extremely high risk of extinction in the wild
VU	Vulnerable	Facing a high risk of extinction in the wild
NT	Near Threatened	Doesn't meet any criteria that would categorise it as risking extinction but likely to in the future
LC	Least Concern	No current identifiable risks to this species
DD	Data Deficient	Inadequate information to make an assessment of the risks to this species

== Order: Artiodactyla (even-toed ungulates) ==
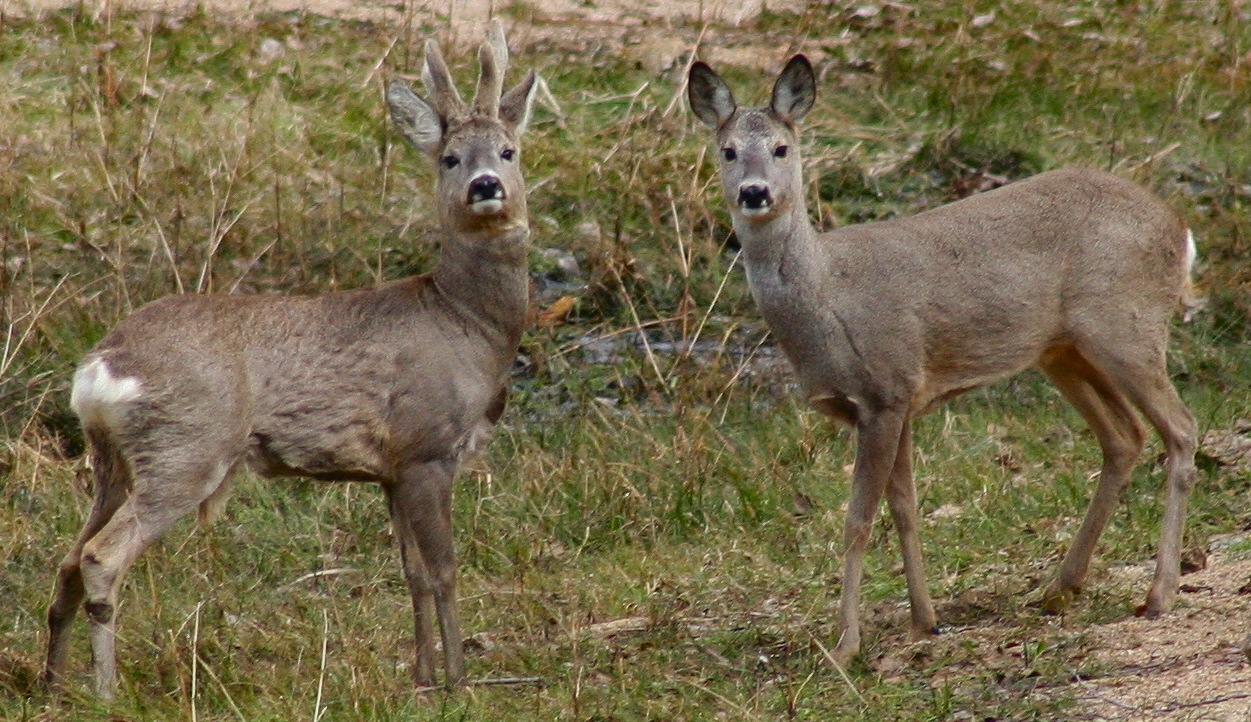
Roe deer

The even-toed ungulates are ungulates whose weight is borne about equally by the third and fourth toes, rather than mostly or entirely by the third as in perissodactyls. There are about 220 artiodactyl species, including many that are of great economic importance to humans.

- Family: Suidae (pigs)
  - Subfamily: Suinae
    - Genus: Sus
      - Wild boar, S. scrofa LC
- Family: Cervidae (deer)
  - Subfamily: Cervinae
    - Genus: Cervus
      - Red deer, C. elaphus LC
      - Sika deer, C. nippon LC (introduced, few sightings in 1980s and more often since 2013)
    - Genus: Dama
      - European fallow deer, D. dama LC (introduced, few sightings since 2012)
  - Subfamily: Capreolinae
    - Genus: Alces
      - Moose, A. alces LC
    - Genus: Capreolus
      - Roe deer, C. capreolus LC

== Order: Carnivora (carnivorans) ==
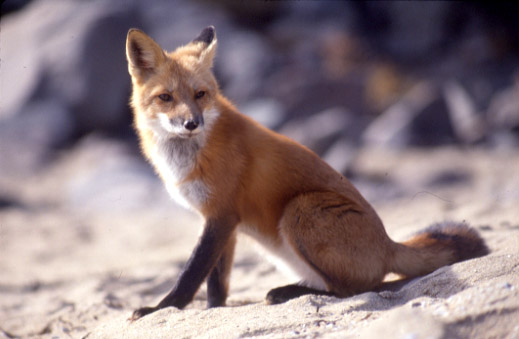
Red fox

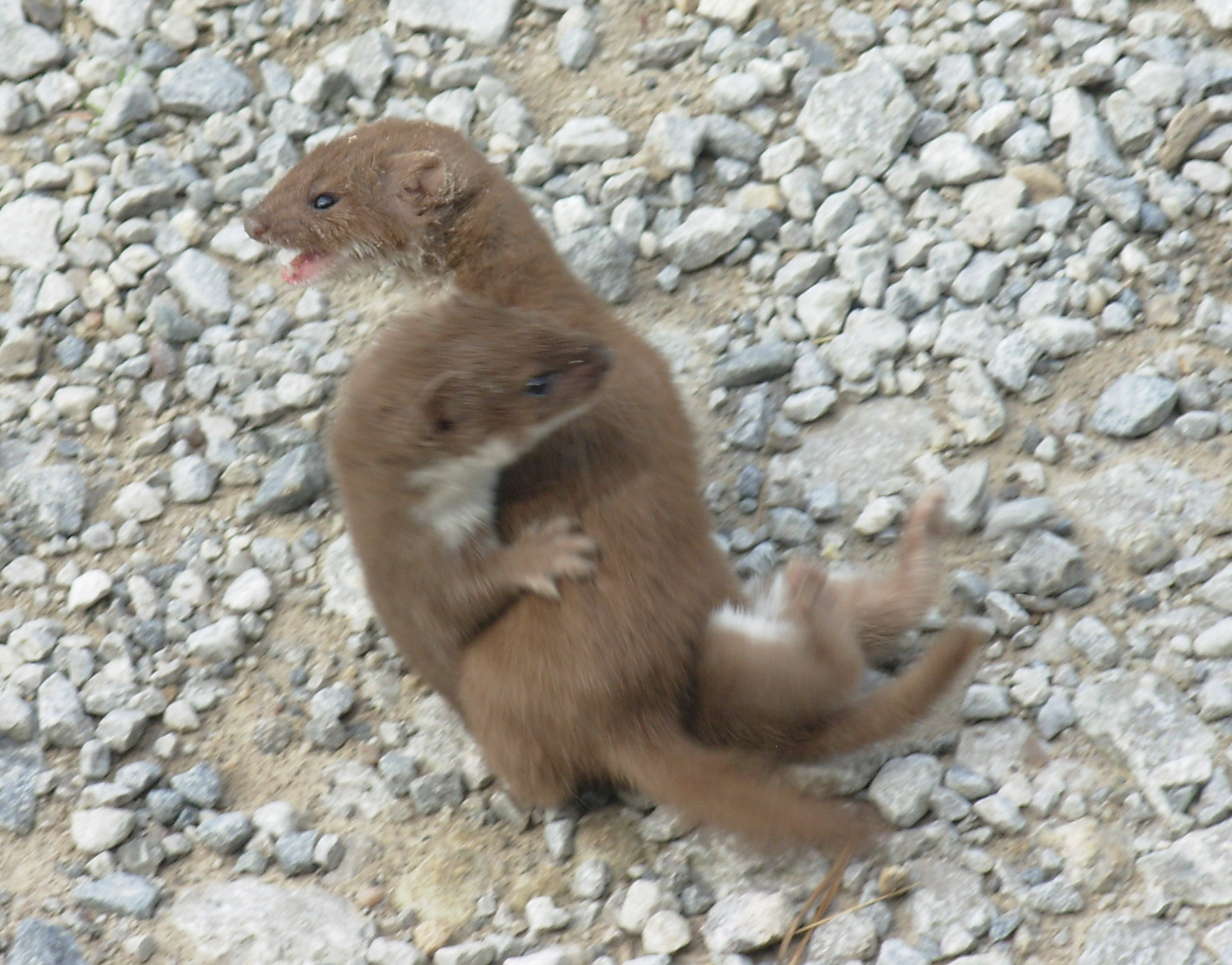
Least weasel

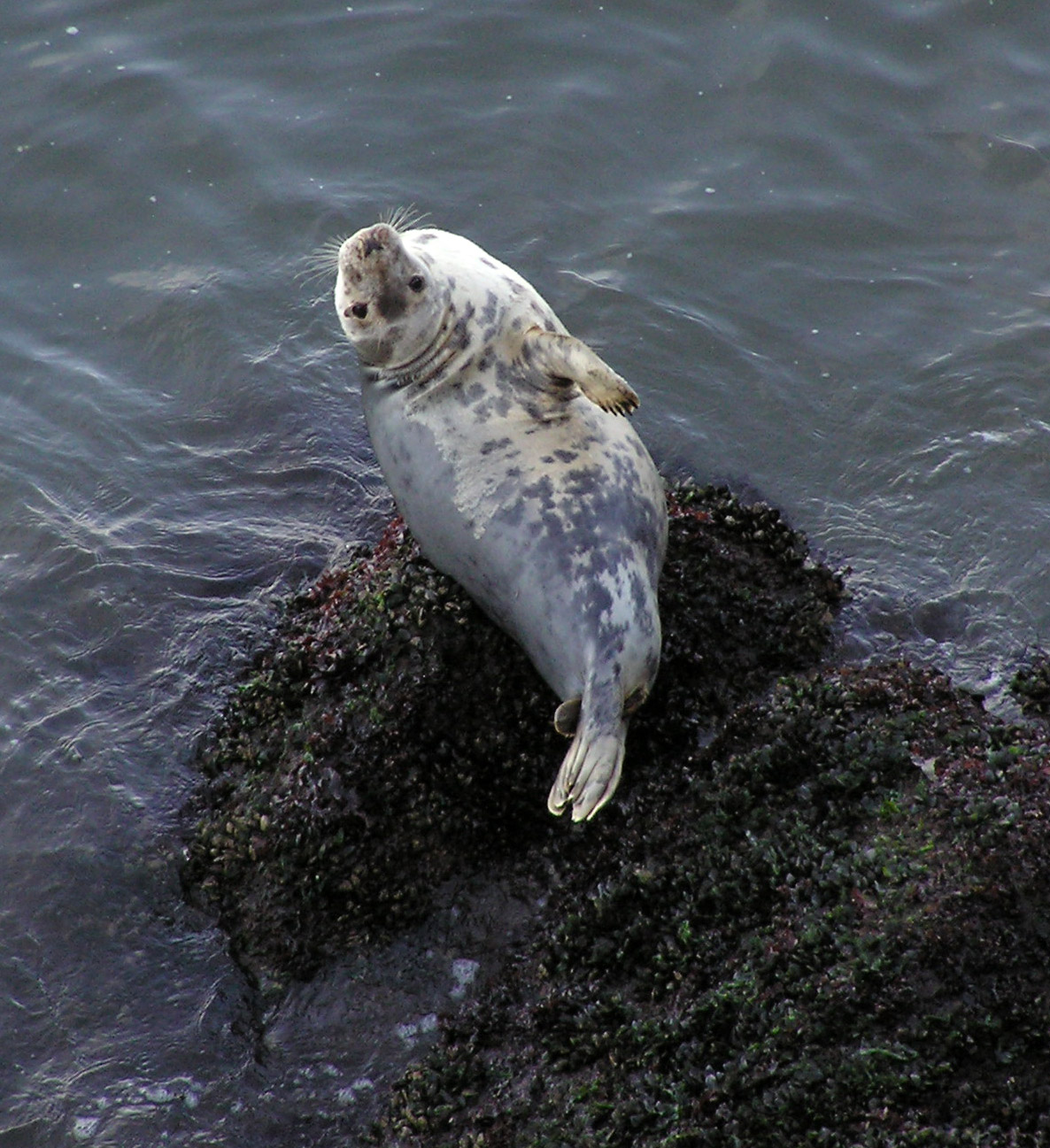
Grey seal

There are over 260 species of carnivorans, the majority of which feed primarily on meat. They have a characteristic skull shape and dentition.

- Suborder: Feliformia
  - Family: Felidae (cats)
    - Subfamily: Felinae
      - Genus: Lynx
        - Eurasian lynx, L. lynx LC
- Suborder: Caniformia
  - Family: Canidae (dogs, foxes)
    - Genus: Canis
      - Gray wolf, C. lupus LC
      - European jackal, C. aureus moreoticus LC (first found in 2013)
    - Genus: Nyctereutes
      - Raccoon dog, N. procyonoides LC (introduced)
    - Genus: Vulpes
      - Red fox, V. vulpes LC
  - Family: Ursidae (bears)
    - Genus: Ursus
      - Brown bear, U. arctos LC
  - Family: Mustelidae (mustelids)
    - Genus: Gulo
      - Wolverine, G. gulo LC (only five proven sightings during the 20th century and none during the 21st)
    - Genus: Lutra
      - European otter, L. lutra NT
    - Genus: Martes
      - Pine marten, M. martes LC
      - Beech marten, M. foina LC
    - Genus: Meles
      - European badger, M. meles LC
    - Genus: Mustela
      - Stoat, M. erminea LC
      - European mink, M. lutreola CR reintroduced
      - Least weasel, M. nivalis LC
      - European polecat, M. putorius LC
    - Genus: Neogale
      - American mink, N. vison LC introduced
  - Family: Phocidae (pinnipeds especially earless seals)
    - Genus: Halichoerus
      - Grey seal, H. grypus LC
    - Genus: Pusa
      - Ringed seal, P. hispida LC

== Order: Cetacea (whales) ==
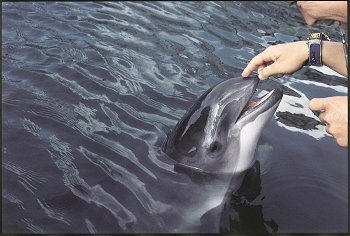
Harbour porpoise

The order Cetacea includes whales, dolphins and porpoises. They are the mammals most fully adapted to aquatic life with a spindle-shaped nearly hairless body, protected by a thick layer of blubber, and forelimbs and tail modified to provide propulsion underwater.

- Suborder: Odontoceti
  - Family: Phocoenidae (porpoises)
    - Genus: Phocoena
      - Harbour porpoise, Phocoena phocoena LC (last proven sighting in 1988)
  - Family: Monodontidae (narwhals)
    - Genus: Delphinapterus
      - Beluga, Delphinapterus leucas LC (last sighted in 1985)
  - Family: Delphinidae (marine dolphins)
    - Genus: Lagenorhynchus
      - White-beaked dolphin, Lagenorhynchus albirostris LC (sighted once in 2008)
    - Genus: Tursiops
      - Common bottlenose dolphin, Tursiops truncatus LC (sighted once in 2020 and maybe also in 2015)

== Order: Chiroptera (bats) ==
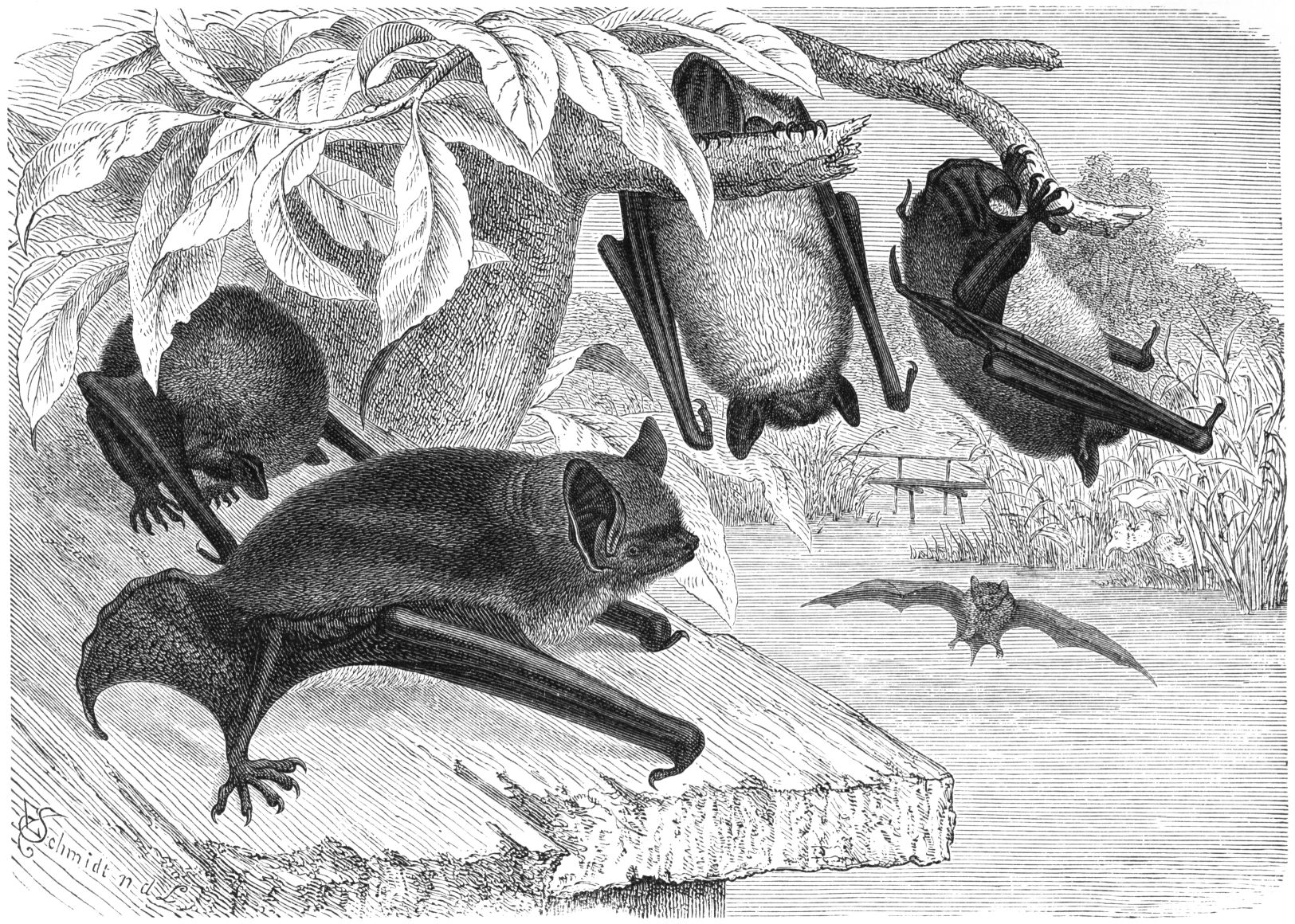
Daubenton's bat

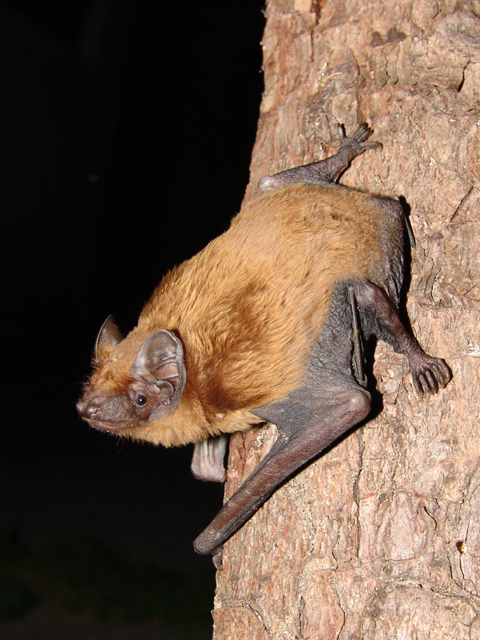
Common noctule

The bats' most distinguishing feature is that their forelimbs are developed as wings, making them the only mammals capable of flight. Bat species account for about 20% of all mammals.

- Family: Vespertilionidae
  - Subfamily: Myotinae
    - Genus: Myotis
      - Brandt's bat, Myotis brandti LC
      - Pond bat, Myotis dasycneme NT
      - Daubenton's bat, Myotis daubentonii LC
      - Whiskered bat, Myotis mystacinus LC
      - Natterer's bat, Myotis nattereri LC
  - Subfamily: Vespertilioninae
    - Genus: Barbastella
      - Western barbastelle, B. barbastellus NT (unproven)
    - Genus: Eptesicus
      - Northern bat, Eptesicus nilssoni LC
    - Genus: Nyctalus
      - Common noctule, Nyctalus noctula LC
    - Genus: Pipistrellus
      - Nathusius' pipistrelle, Pipistrellus nathusii LC
      - Common pipistrelle, Pipistrellus pipistrellus LC
      - Soprano pipistrelle, Pipistrellus pygmaeus LC
    - Genus: Plecotus
      - Brown long-eared bat, P. auritus LC
    - Genus: Vespertilio
      - Parti-coloured bat, Vespertilio murinus LC

== Order: Eulipotyphla (hedgehogs, shrews and moles) ==
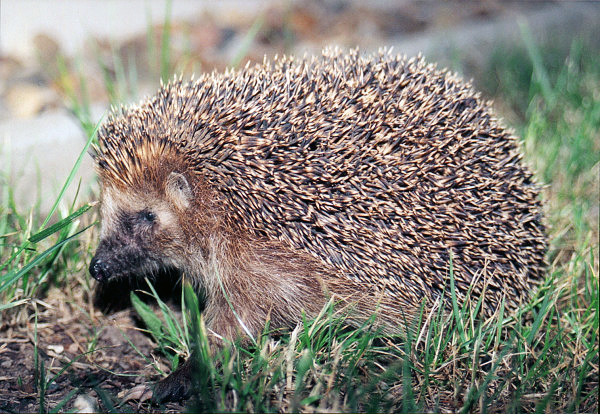
West European hedgehog

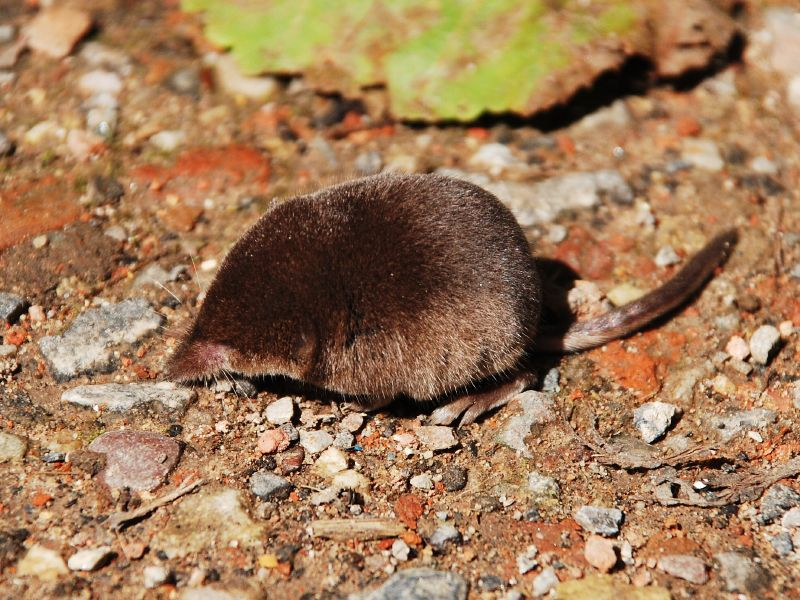
Eurasian pygmy shrew

Hedgehogs are easily recognised by their spines, shrews closely resemble mice, and moles are stout-bodied burrowers.

- Family: Erinaceidae (hedgehogs)
  - Subfamily: Erinaceinae
    - Genus: Erinaceus
      - West European hedgehog, E. europaeus NT
      - Northern white-breasted hedgehog, E. roumanicus LC
- Family: Soricidae (shrews)
  - Subfamily: Soricinae
    - Tribe: Nectogalini
      - Genus: Neomys
        - Eurasian water shrew, Neomys fodiens LC
        - Mediterranean water shrew, Neomys anomalus LC
    - Tribe: Soricini
      - Genus: Sorex
        - Common shrew, Sorex araneus LC
        - Laxmann's shrew, Sorex caecutiens LC
        - Eurasian pygmy shrew, Sorex minutus LC
        - Eurasian least shrew, Sorex minutissimus LC (one uncertain finding from 1971)
- Family: Talpidae (moles)
  - Subfamily: Talpinae
    - Tribe: Talpini
      - Genus: Talpa
        - European mole, Talpa europaea LC

== Order: Lagomorpha (lagomorphs) ==
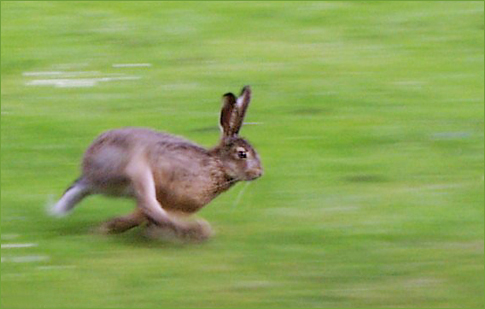
European hare

The lagomorphs comprise two families, Leporidae (hares and rabbits), and Ochotonidae (pikas). Though they can resemble rodents, and were classified as a superfamily in that order until the early twentieth century, they have since been considered a separate order. They differ from rodents in a number of physical characteristics, such as having four incisors in the upper jaw rather than two.

- Family: Leporidae (rabbits, hares)
  - Genus: Lepus
    - European hare, L. europaeus LC
    - Mountain hare, L. timidus LC

== Order: Rodentia (rodents) ==
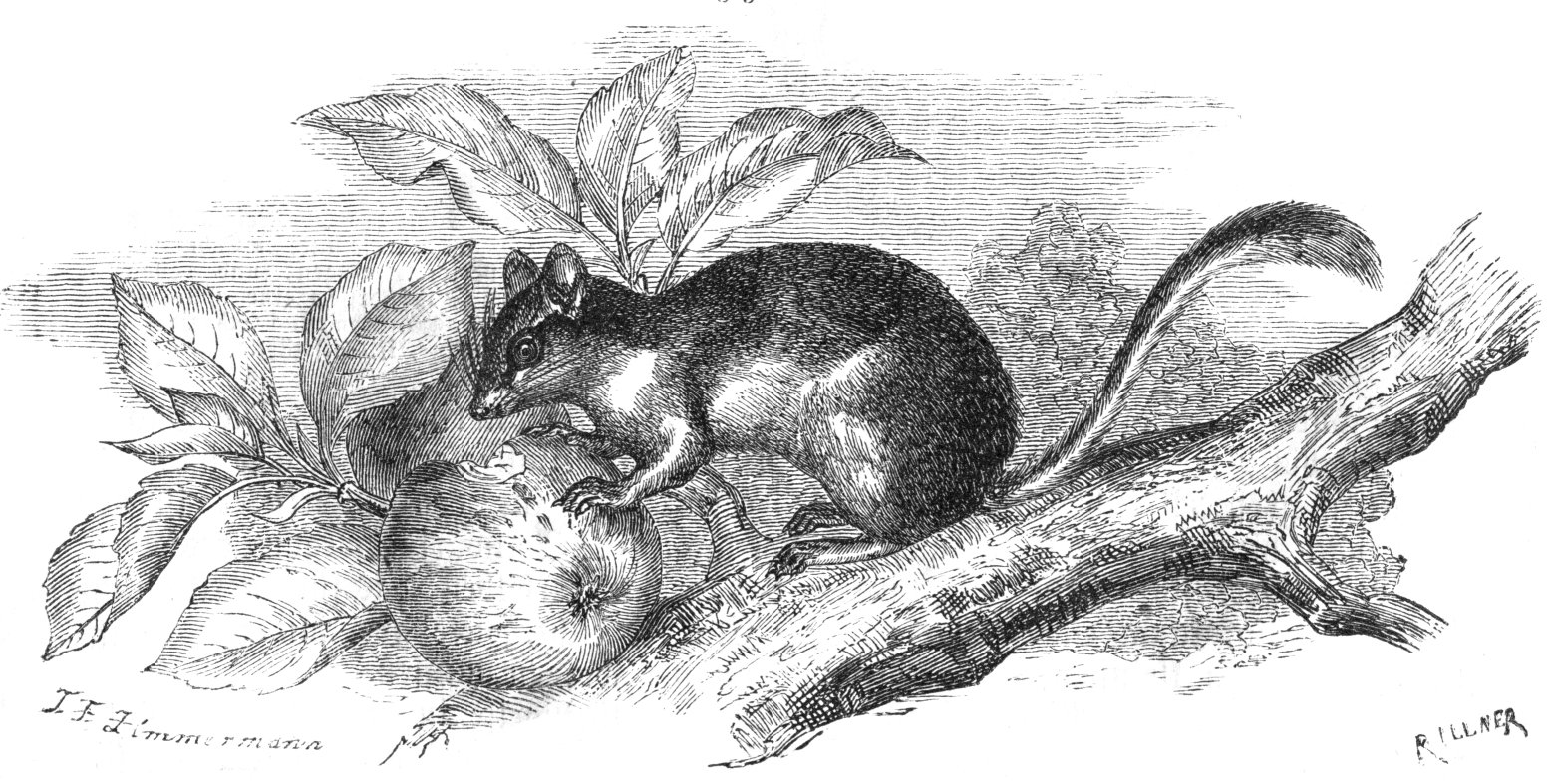
Garden dormouse

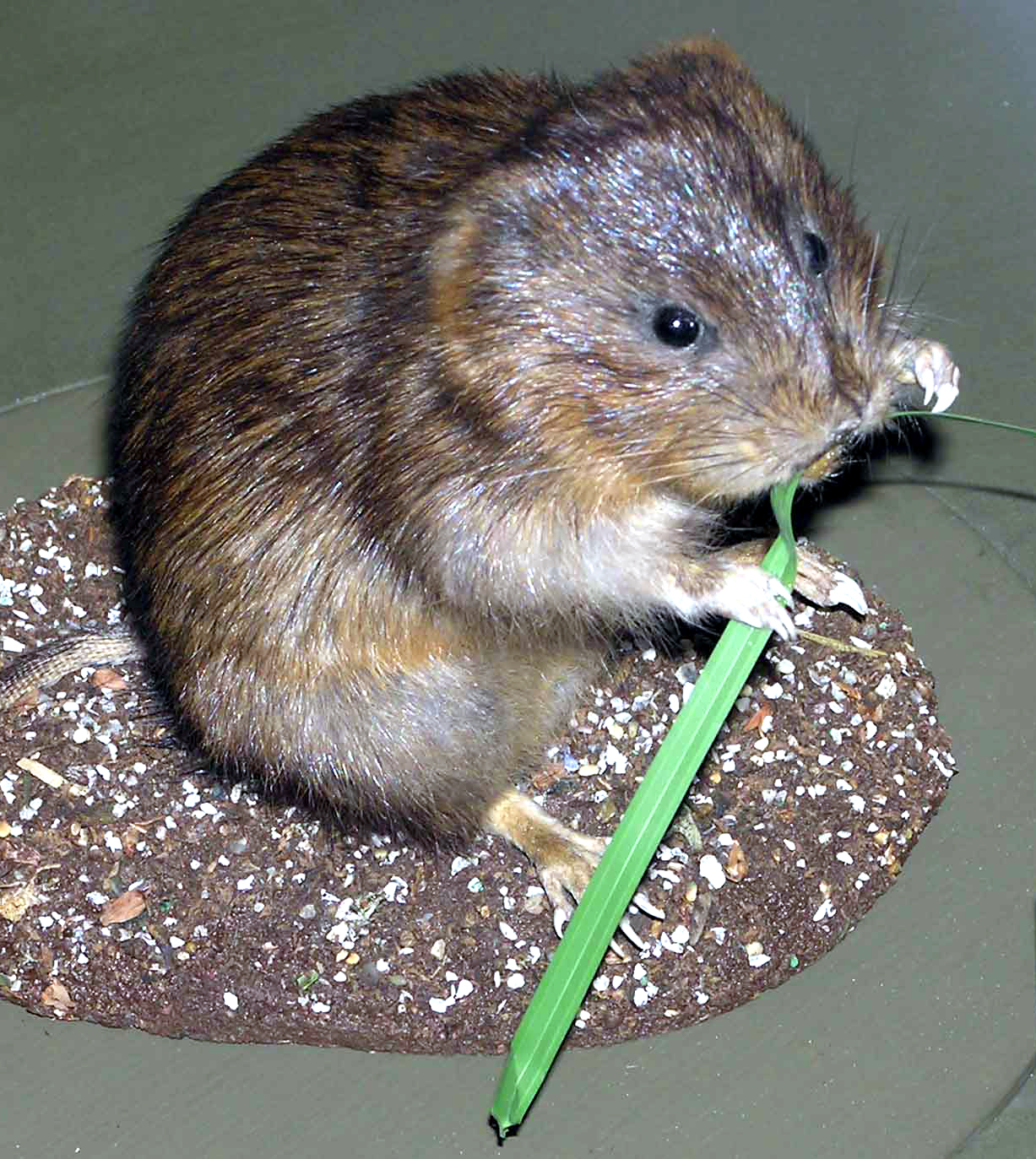
Water vole

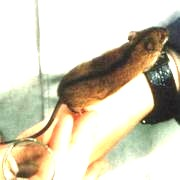
Striped field mouse

Rodents make up the largest order of mammals, with over 40% of mammalian species. They have two incisors in the upper and lower jaw which grow continually and must be kept short by gnawing. Most rodents are small though the capybara can weigh up to 45 kg (99 lb).

- Suborder: Sciurognathi
  - Family: Castoridae (beavers)
    - Genus: Castor
      - Eurasian beaver, C. fiber LC
  - Family: Sciuridae (squirrels)
    - Subfamily: Sciurinae
      - Tribe: Sciurini
        - Genus: Sciurus
          - Red squirrel, S. vulgaris LC
    - Tribe: Pteromyini
      - Genus: Pteromys
        - Siberian flying squirrel, P. volans LC
  - Family: Gliridae (dormice)
    - Subfamily: Leithiinae
      - Genus: Eliomys
        - Garden dormouse, Eliomys quercinus NT (last sighted in 1986)
      - Genus: Muscardinus
        - Hazel dormouse, Muscardinus avellanarius LC (last sighted in 1986)
  - Family: Dipodidae (jerboas)
    - Subfamily: Sicistinae
      - Genus: Sicista
        - Northern birch mouse, Sicista betulina LC
  - Family: Cricetidae
    - Subfamily: Arvicolinae
      - Genus: Arvicola
        - European water vole or north-western water vole, Arvicola amphibius LC
      - Genus: Clethrionomys
        - Bank vole, Myodes glareolus or Clethrionomys glareolus LC
      - Genus: Microtus
        - Field vole, Microtus agrestis LC
        - Common vole, Microtus arvalis LC
        - Root vole, Microtus oeconomus LC (one lower jaw found in 1970)
        - Sibling vole, Microtus levis LC
        - European pine vole, Microtus subterraneus LC
      - Genus: Myopus
        - Wood lemming, Myopus schisticolor LC (first found in 2019)
      - Genus: Ondatra
        - Muskrat, Ondatra zibethicus LC (introduced)
  - Family: Muridae (mice, rats, voles, gerbils, hamsters, etc.)
    - Subfamily: Murinae
      - Genus: Apodemus
        - Striped field mouse, Apodemus agrarius LC
        - Yellow-necked mouse, Apodemus flavicollis LC
        - Ural field mouse, Apodemus uralensis LC
      - Genus: Micromys
        - Harvest mouse, Micromys minutus LC
      - Genus: Rattus
        - Brown rat, Rattus norvegicus LC
        - Black rat, Rattus rattus LC
      - Genus: Mus
        - House mouse, Mus musculus LC

== See also ==
- Fauna of Estonia
- List of chordate orders
- Lists of mammals by region
- List of prehistoric mammals
- Mammal classification
- List of mammals described in the 2000s
