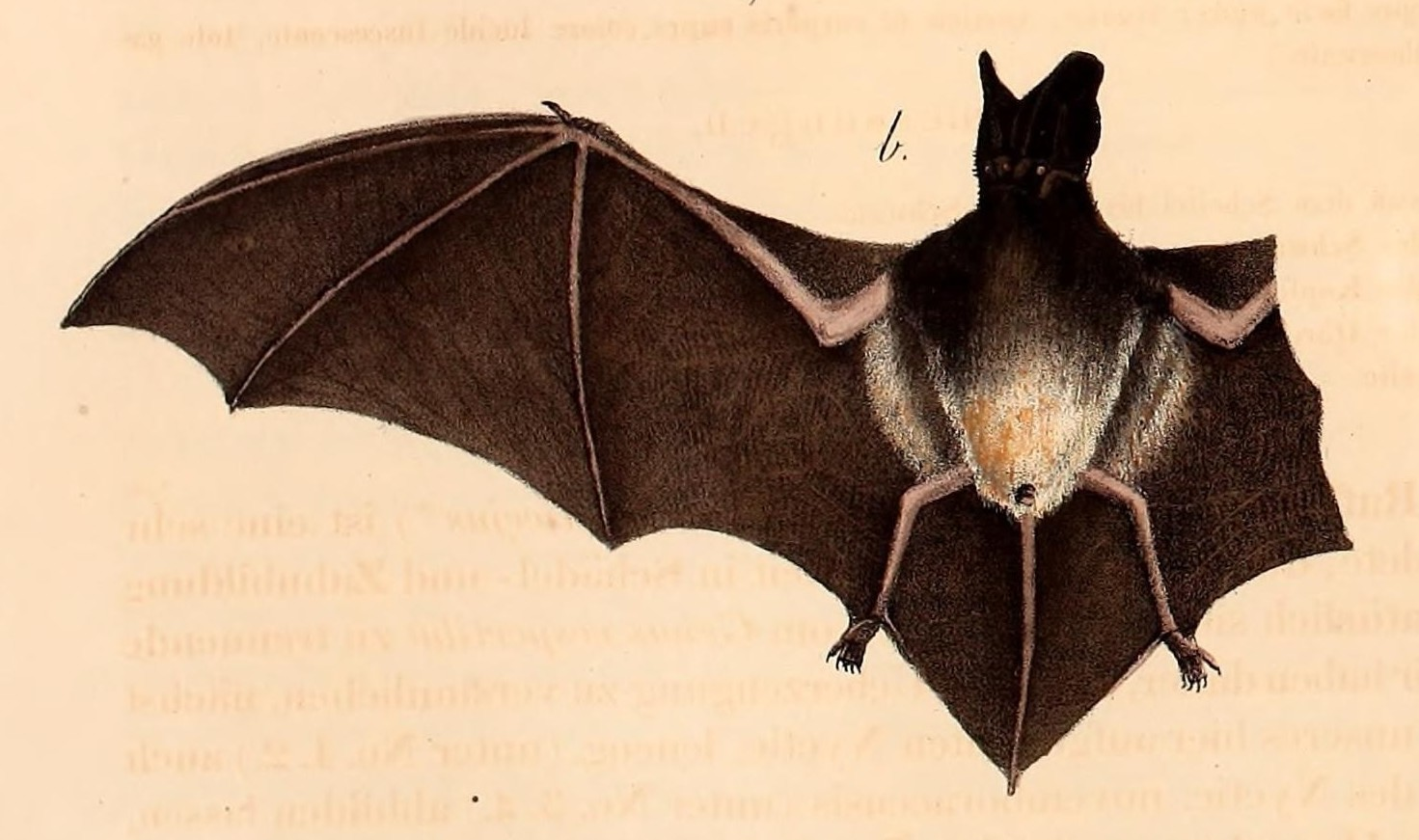

Conservation status
- Least Concern (IUCN 3.1)

Scientific classification
- Kingdom: Animalia
- Phylum: Chordata
- Class: Mammalia
- Order: Chiroptera
- Family: Vespertilionidae
- Genus: Barbastella
- Species: B. leucomelas

Binomial name
- Barbastella leucomelas (Cretzschmar, 1826)

Synonyms
- Vespertilio leucomelas Cretzschmar, 1826

= Arabian barbastelle =

Species of bat

The Arabian barbastelle (Barbastella leucomelas), also known as the levant barbastelle, is a species of vesper bat. Its habitat is temperate forests and caves. It is threatened by habitat loss. It is found in Egypt (Sinai), Israel, and Eritrea.

== Taxonomy and etymology ==
It was described as a new species in 1826 by German scientist Philipp Jakob Cretzschmar. Cretzschmar initially placed it in the genus Vespertilio, with the binomial Vespertilio leucomelas. Its species name "leucomelas" is from Ancient Greek "leukomélās" meaning "black and white."

Previously, it was also thought to have a wider range across much of Asia, and accordingly was named the "eastern barbastelle" or "Asian barbastelle". However, genetic studies indicated that the species was paraphyletic as previously defined, with B. leucomelas from Egypt (B. leucomelas sensu stricto) being the sister species to the Beijing barbastelle (B. beijingensis), with the clade containing both being sister to the western barbastelle (B. barbastellus). Populations of B. leucomelas from much of Asia formed a sister group to this whole clade. Due to this, the eastern barbastelle (B. darjelingensis) and Caspian barbastelle (B. caspica) were both split as distinct species (with the Japanese barbastelle, B. pacifica, formerly classified within B. leucomelas and later B. darjelingensis, being described as a distinct species in 2019). The American Society of Mammalogists, IUCN Red List, and ITIS all follow the results of this study.

== Range and habitat ==
Following taxonomic revisions, it is only known from a few scattered populations in North & East Africa and the Levant, on both sides of the Red Sea. It is known from northern Eritrea, southernmost Israel, and the Sinai Peninsula of Egypt. It has been documented up to 2,500 m (8,200 ft) above sea level.

== Description ==
Its forearm is 38–39 mm (1.5–1.5 in) long and its tail is 19–20 mm (0.75–0.79 in) long. Its ears are large and forward-facing. The tragi are large as well and very hairy. Its fur is blackish on its back but more brown on its ventral side. Its thumb is quite small, at 4 mm (0.16 in) long including the claw.

== Biology and ecology ==
During the day, it roosts in sheltered places such as old buildings.

== Status ==
Although classified as Least Concern by the IUCN Red List, the population size and trends of the North African population (leucomelas sensu stricto) are currently unknown. Activities associated with war may be a threat to this species, as they can disrupt its habitat as well as damage or disturb the caves and old buildings that this species roosts in.
