= Beijing barbastelle =

Conservation status
- Data Deficient (IUCN 3.1)

Scientific classification
- Kingdom: Animalia
- Phylum: Chordata
- Class: Mammalia
- Order: Chiroptera
- Family: Vespertilionidae
- Genus: Barbastella
- Species: B. beijingensis

Binomial name
- Barbastella beijingensis Zhang et al., 2007

Synonyms
- Beijing Wide-Eared Bat

Species of bat

The Beijing barbastelle (Barbastella beijingensis), also known as the Beijing wide-eared bat, is a species of vesper bat endemic to Beijing Municipality, China. The species was discovered by Chinese zoology students in 2001 in caves of Fangshan District in southwestern Beijing and was identified as a distinct species by zoologists Zhang Shuyi, Gareth Jones, Zhang Jingshuo and Han Naijian in 2007.

== Taxonomy ==
Phylogenetic evidence supports it not being closely related to other eastern Asian barbastelle species, and instead being the sister species to the Arabian barbastelle (B. leucomelas) of northern Africa and the Levant. The clade containing both is the sister group to the western barbastelle (B. barbastella).

== Description ==
The Beijing barbastelle is a relatively large member of the genus Barbastella with forearm length of 41.1-46.4 mm and body mass of 10.5-13.9 g. It has dark black dorsal fur with brown-gray tips and lighter ventral fur. The shape of its ear and the frequency of its echolocation calls are distinct from those of its closest relatives, the Asian barbastelle and western barbastelle.

== Range and habitat ==
The Beijing barbastelle has only been found in caves and one abandoned tunnel in Fangshan District, near Yunxiaoling, in a mountainous region with riparian woodland.

== Conservation ==
As of 2021, it is evaluated as data deficient by the IUCN.

== See also ==
- Beijing mouse-eared bat
