= Elistvere Animal Park =

Zoo in Estonia

Logo

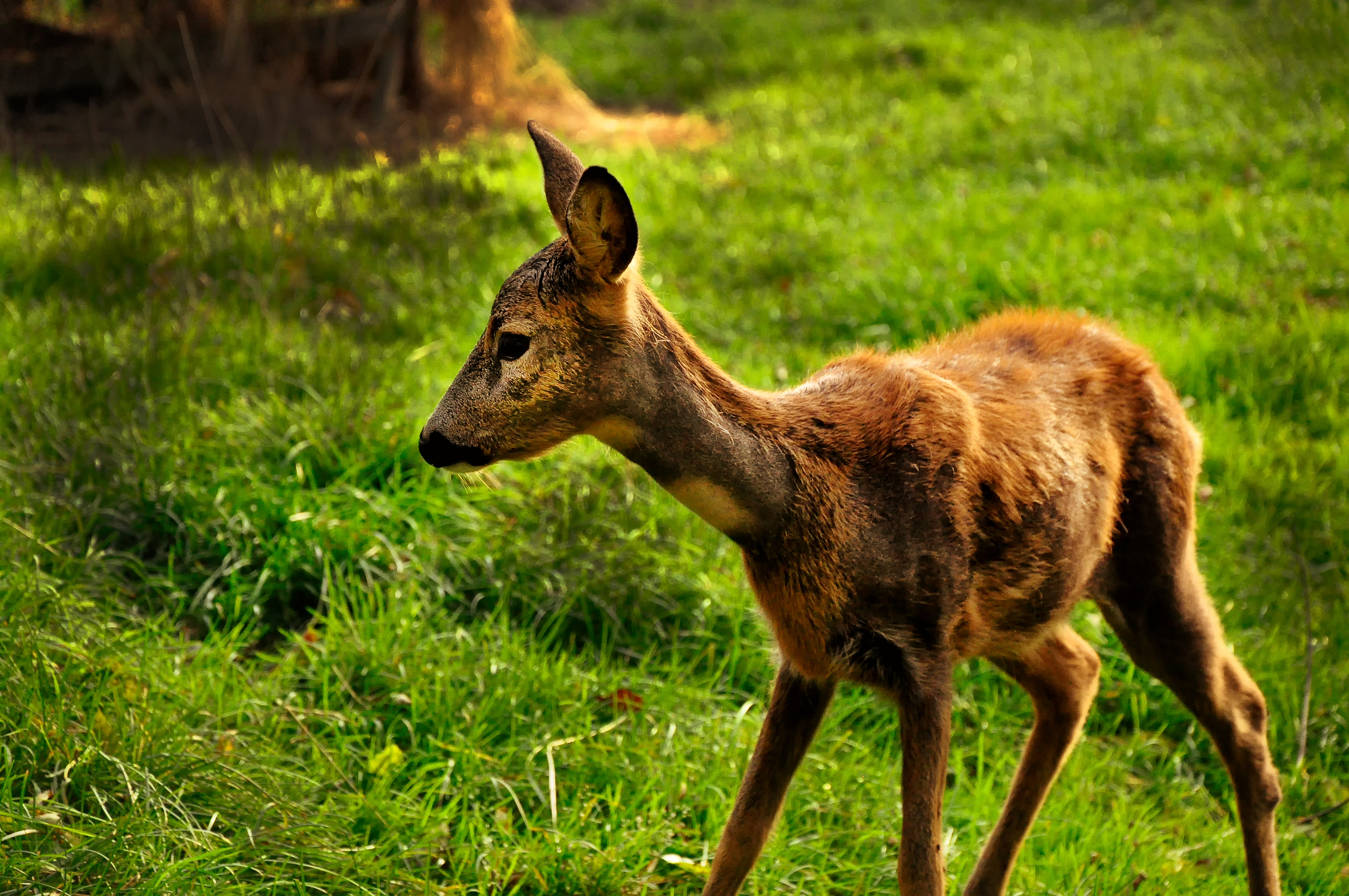
Young deer in Elistvere Animal Park

Elistvere Animal Park (Estonian: Elistvere loomapark) is a zoological park in Tartu County, Estonia. It specialises in the native fauna of Estonia and is operated by the State Forest Management Centre.

The park was founded in 1997 and aims to display animals and birds in as natural conditions as possible. It also aims to provide educational facilities and activities, and create a sanctuary for animals that have been injured or orphaned.

In 2020 the park recorded 79,000 visitors, a record despite the year's coronavirus pandemic.

In March 2025 the park received a new female Eurasian brown bear.
