= Eastern barbastelle =

Conservation status
- Least Concern (IUCN 3.1)

Scientific classification
- Kingdom: Animalia
- Phylum: Chordata
- Class: Mammalia
- Order: Chiroptera
- Family: Vespertilionidae
- Genus: Barbastella
- Species: B. darjelingensis

Binomial name
- Barbastella darjelingensis (Hodgson, 1855)
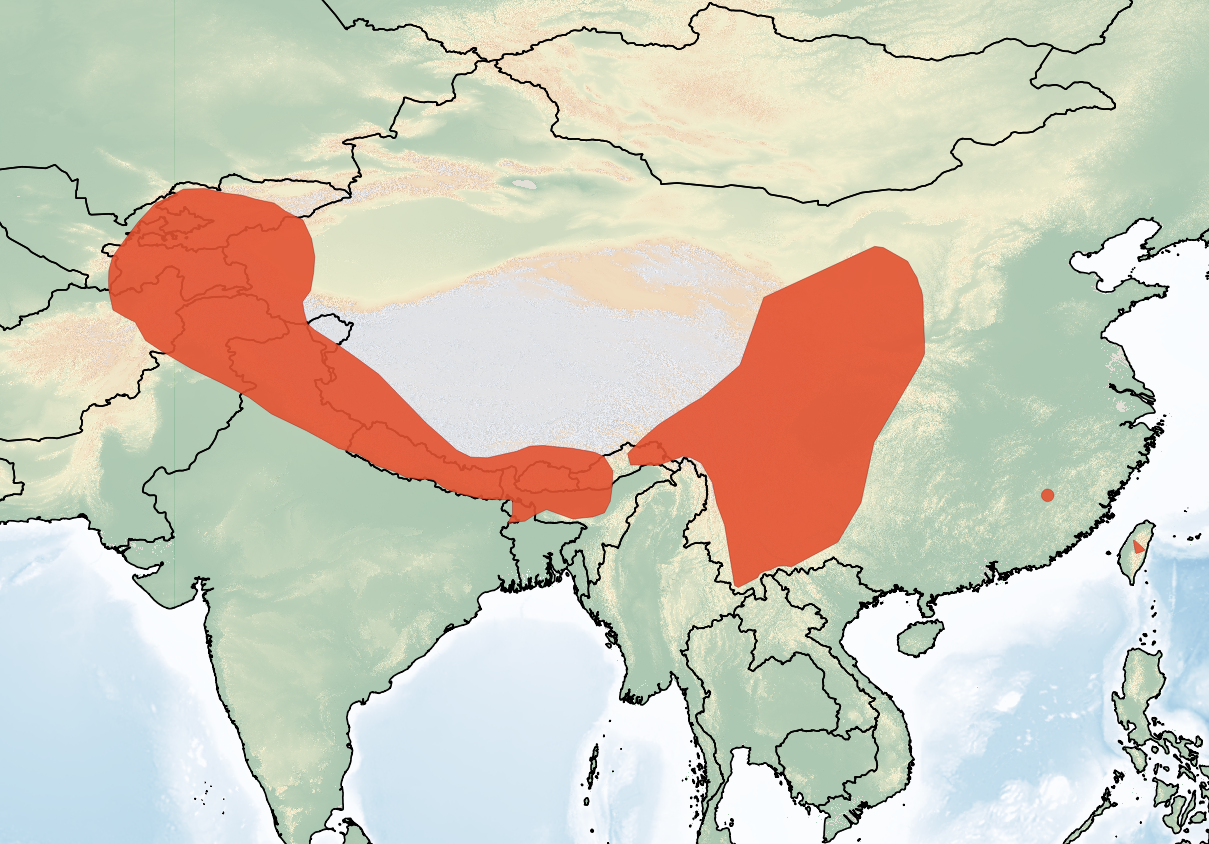

Synonyms
- Plecotus darjelingensis Barbastella leucomelas darjelingensis

Species of bat

The eastern barbastelle or Asian barbastelle (Barbastella darjelingensis) is a species of vesper bat found throughout much of Asia, from Afghanistan to Taiwan.

== Taxonomy ==
It was described by Brian Houghton Hodgson in 1855, and was previously thought to be a subspecies of the Arabian barbastelle (B. leucomelas), with B. leucomelas being previously known as the eastern or Asian barbastelle when it contained B. darjelingensis. However, a 2008 study, and several later genetic analyses, found B. leucomelas to be a distinct species from B. darjelingensis, and thus split them both. The American Society of Mammalogists, IUCN Red List, and ITIS all follow the results of this study. Further genetic studies indicate that B. darjelingensis itself contains many cryptic lineages that could represent distinct species, but this is disputed due to all most populations having similar morphology to one another. However, the Caspian barbastelle (B. caspica) and Japanese barbastelle (B. pacifica) are indeed thought to represent distinct species and have been split as such by the ASM and ITIS, with the IUCN also acknowledging them but not yet providing a conservation status.

The specific epithet darjelingensis references the Indian town of Darjeeling, the type locality of this species.

== Distribution and habitat ==
This species has a very wide range across Central, South, and East Asia, ranging from Afghanistan south throughout the Himalayas and east through China, as far east as Taiwan and as far south as Vietnam. There is a single dubious record from Tamil Nadu in southern India. Its range is thought to comprise mountainous areas at moderate elevations, where it inhabits montane temperate and subtropical forests. It likely roosts in caves, rock crevices, and tree hollows. It has been recorded foraging over streams.

== Status ==
This species may be threatened by unregulated visits to and destruction of the underground cavities where it roosts, as well as destruction of and use of pesticides in foraging habitat. Populations in South Asia are threatened by deforestation, which has reduced the range and quality of potential habitat for this species. However, it has a wide range with significant portions in sparsely populated regions, so it is not thought to be threatened. However, if the cryptic lineages within this species are found out to represent valid species of their own, they may warrant a higher threat status.
