= Beijing mouse-eared bat =

Conservation status
- Least Concern (IUCN 3.1)

Scientific classification
- Kingdom: Animalia
- Phylum: Chordata
- Class: Mammalia
- Order: Chiroptera
- Family: Vespertilionidae
- Genus: Myotis
- Species: M. pequinius

Binomial name
- Myotis pequinius Thomas, 1908
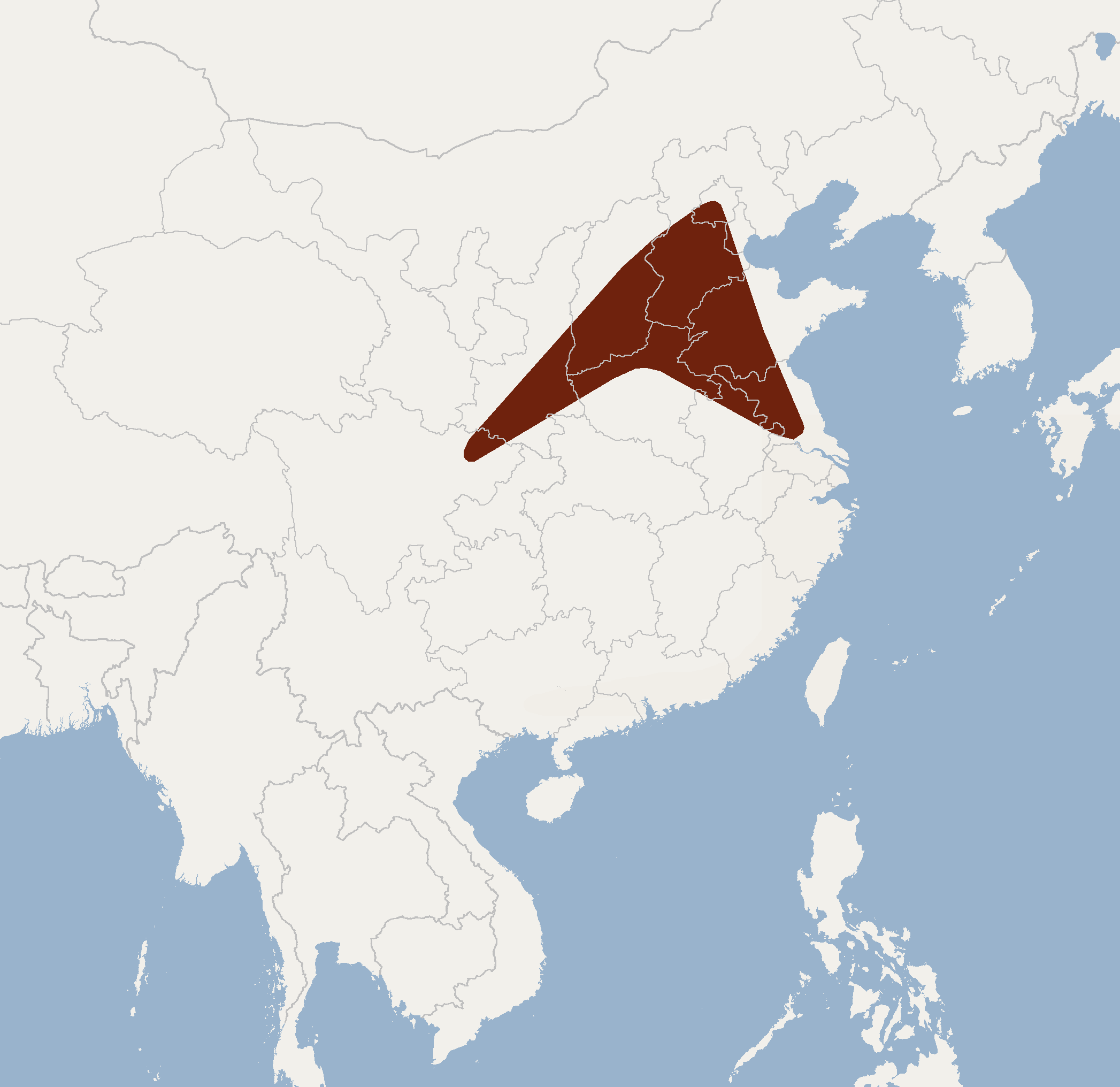

Species of bat

The Beijing mouse-eared bat or Peking myotis (Myotis pequinius) is a species of vesper bat. It is found only in China.

== Taxonomy ==
It was described as a new species in 1908 by British zoologist Oldfield Thomas. The holotype had been collected by Malcolm Playfair Anderson in 1907. Anderson encountered the species in a cave 30 mi (48 km) west of Beijing.

== Description ==
It is a relatively large mouse-eared bat with a forearm length of 48–50 mm (1.9–2.0 in). Its fur is short and velvety, with the fur on its back a gray, reddish-brown. In contrast, its belly fur is off-white.

== Biology and ecology ==
It is insectivorous, consuming mostly beetles. During the day, individuals roost in caves, though they may also roost in human structures.

== Range and habitat ==
The Beijing mouse-eared bat is endemic to China, where it is found in the provinces of Anhui, Beijing, Henan, Jiangsu, Shanxi, and Sichuan.

== Conservation ==
As of 2019, it is evaluated as a least-concern species by the IUCN. It meets the criteria for this classification because its extent of occurrence exceeds 20,000 km^{2} (7,700 sq mi); its population is presumably large; and it is unlikely to be experiencing rapid population decline.

== See also ==
- Beijing barbastelle
