= Eversden and Wimpole Woods =

Site of Special Scientific Interest in Cambridgeshire

Coordinates: 52.156°N 0.040°E

- Site of Special Scientific Interest
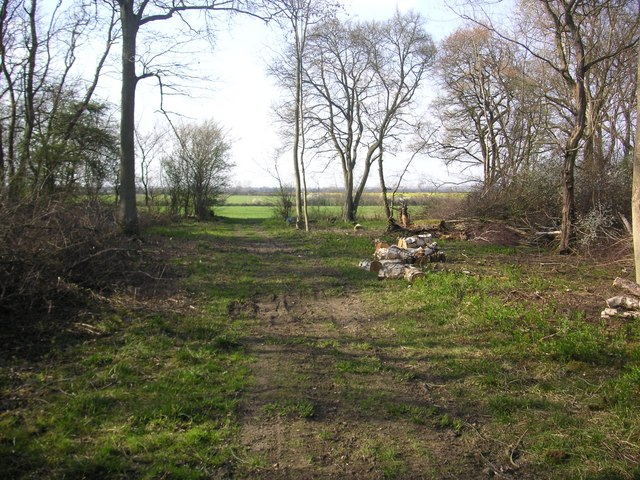
- Eversden Wood
- Location of Eversden and Wimpole Woods.
- Area of search: Cambridgeshire
- Grid reference: TL 342 527
- Interest: Biological
- Area: 67.1 hectares
- Notification date: 2003
- Location map: Magic Map

Eversden and Wimpole Woods is a 67.1-hectare (166-acre) biological Site of Special Scientific Interest between Kingston and Orwell in Cambridgeshire. The site has been designated a Special Area of Conservation for its barbastelle bats.

Wimpole Wood has six bat species, including the barbastelle, which is a very rare species in Britain; females give birth and raise young in tree crevices. Eversden Wood is a species rich example of a type of woodland rare in lowland Britain, with ancient ash and field maple trees. It has many herbs typical of old woodlands.

There is access to the woods by public footpaths.
