= Barbastella maxima =

Barbastella maxima Temporal range: Late Miocene

Scientific classification
- Kingdom: Animalia
- Phylum: Chordata
- Class: Mammalia
- Infraclass: Placentalia
- Order: Chiroptera
- Family: Vespertilionidae
- Genus: Barbastella
- Species: †B. maxima

Binomial name
- †Barbastella maxima Rosina et al., 2019

Extinct species of bat

Barbastella maxima is an extinct species of Barbastella that lived in Ukraine during the Late Miocene.
