= State Forest Management Centre =

Government agency of Estonia

RMK logo

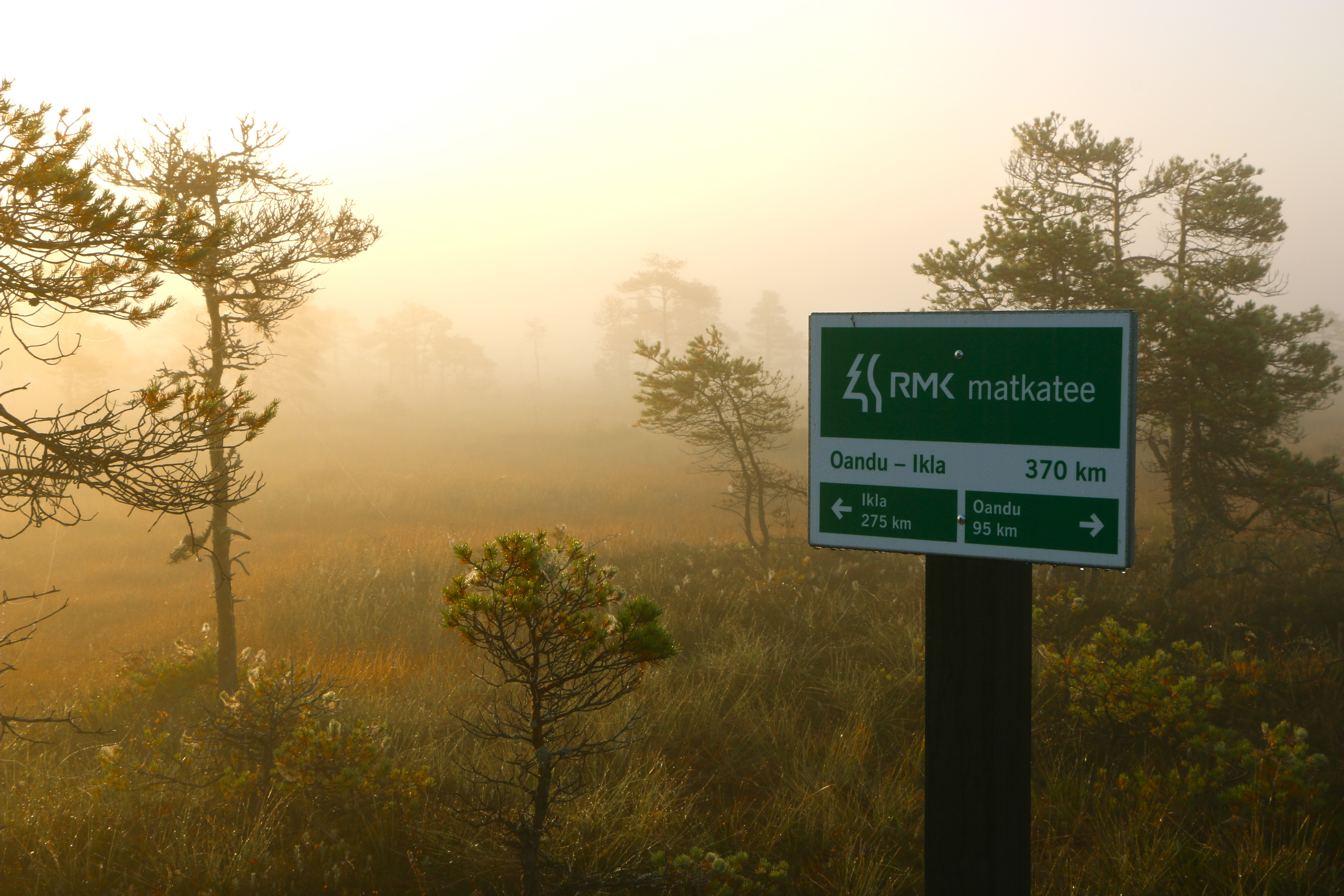
RMK sign in Kakerdaja Bog

State Forest Management Centre (Estonian: Riigimetsa Majandamise Keskus, abbreviated RMK) is an Estonian state institution which focuses mainly on forest management in Estonia, but also seed and plant management, timber marketing, land management, nature conservation, visitor management and nature education.

RMK’s forestry duties include the growing and guarding of the state forest, planting and growing of new forest, organising forestry works and sale of timber. RMK maintains forest roads and drainage systems.

== Forestry, logging, and controversies ==
In 2012, Estonia had forests that covered 48% of the land, and is an environment unique in Europe. However recent years have seen a substantial increase in logging, and logging occurs not only nationwide in private land, but even in supposedly protected national parks. Estonia needs to cut significantly less forest to retain biodiversity and meet the country's carbon sequestration goal, but it is increasing, and in 2022 the State Forest Management Center reported a record profit of 1.4 billion euros.

The European Commission has launched a court case against Estonia for logging forest in protected areas, causing the country to risk a 100,000 euro per day fine. Some NGOs are also taking the country to court.

In addition, several Estonian news outlets have reported the on Ministry of the Environment and the State Forest Management Centre “misleading” the public about logging in the country.

The RMK is both responsible for protecting the nation's forests, as well as overseeing exploitation of the resources, leading to a natural conflict of interest within the Estonian government. One example is a situation where the director-general of the Environment Board resigned shortly after temporarily pausing logging to protect nesting birds.

== Other RMK roles ==
RMK provides as varied opportunities as possible for recreation, while not harming the biota there. RMK builds hiking trails, maintains accommodation facilities, marks scenic recreational areas, and prepares camping sites and campfire places. Besides the creation of recreational opportunities, RMK also provides education about the natural environment.

RMK’s plant and seed management area grows tree sets and ensures Estonia has a sufficient reserve of forest seed.

RMK consists of Sagadi Forest Centre, Elistvere Animal Park and, as of 2014, also the Põlula Fish Farm. One to two year old juvenile salmon are grown in Põlula, in order to increase the biodiversity of Estonian rivers.

The RMK was established in 1999.
