= Fauna of Estonia =

Estonia is a small, heavily forested country situated on the Baltic Sea. It is a part of the Euro-Siberian region of terrestrial Palearctic realm, and the Temperate Northern Atlantic marine ecoregion.

Phytogeographically, Estonia is shared between the Central European and Eastern European provinces of the Circumboreal Region within the Boreal Kingdom. According to the WWF, the territory of Estonia belongs to the ecoregion of Sarmatic mixed forests.

Estonia's sparse population and large areas of forest have allowed stocks of European lynx, wild boar, brown bears, and moose to survive, among other animals. Estonia is thought to have a wolf population of around 200, which is considered slightly above the optimum range of 100 to 200. Estonian birdlife is characterized by rare seabirds like the Steller's eider (Polysticta stelleri), lesser white-fronted goose (Anser erythropus) and black-tailed godwit (Limosa limosa), wetland birds like the great snipe (Gallinago media), dry open country birds like the corn crake (Crex crex) and European roller (Coracias garrulus) and large birds of prey like the greater spotted eagle (Aquila clanga). Estonia has five national parks, including Lahemaa National Park on the northern coast as the largest. Soomaa National Park, between Pärnu and Viljandi, is known for its wetlands. Reserves such as Käina Bay Bird Reserve and Matsalu National Park (a wetland of international importance under the Ramsar Convention) are also popular with locals and tourists and support a wide variety of birdlife.

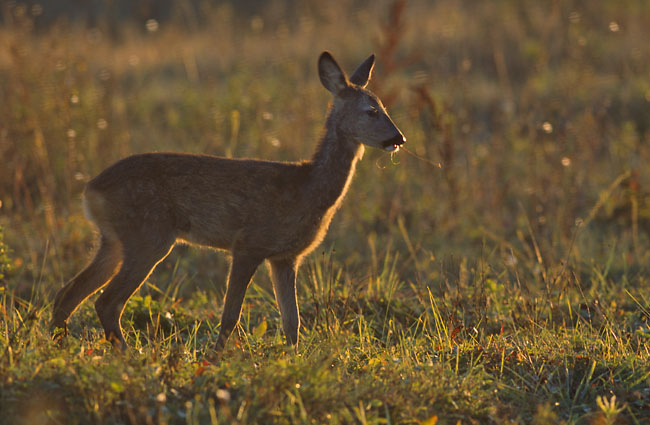
The roe deer is the most common ungulate of Estonia.

== Vertebrates ==
The largest bear populations can be found in north east Estonia in Ida-Viru County and Lääne-Viru County. The numbers of bears, lynx and wolves suffered during the Soviet Occupation as the animals were persecuted heavily. After they were given protection the numbers of the larger carnivores peaked in the early 1990s but they have since fallen slightly from those highs due to increased hunting pressure. In 2008, Estonia was home to approximately 620 brown bears, 760 lynx, and 135 wolves. As of early 2010, large ungulates included 48,040 roe deer (down from 63,000 in 2009), 11,741 European elk, 2,831 red deer, and 22,642 wild boars.

Its birdlife includes golden eagles and white storks. It has around a dozen national parks and protected areas, including Lahemaa National Park, the country's largest park, on the northern coast. Soomaa National Park, near Pärnu, is known for its ancient wetlands. Reserves such as Käina Bay Bird Reserve and Matsalu Nature Reserve (a wetland of international importance under the Ramsar Convention) are also popular with locals and tourists and support a wide variety of birdlife.

== Invertebrates ==
The following table gives an overview of species numbers of selected invertebrate groups.

Group	Known species	Estimated number of species
Amoeboids	68	140
Flagellates	89	200
Apicomplexa	13	50
Ciliophora	176	300
Sponges	3	6
Hydrozoa	5	8
Scyphozoa	3	3
Turbellaria	55	200
Monogenea	73	40
Digenea	110	130
Ribbon worms	106	130
Gastrotricha	6	40
Rotatoria	230	500
Nematoda	200	500
Nematomorpha	1	5
Kinorhyncha	1	3
Acanthocephala	14	40
Nemertea	4	10
Priapulida	1	?
Polychaeta	6	?
Oligochaeta	103	200
Bryozoa	7	15
Gastropods	74	80
Bivalves	62	70
Crustacea	326	356
Arachnids	786	2055
Myriapods	38	50
Tardigrades	1	50
Insects	~10000	20000-21000

== See also ==
- List of mammals of Estonia
- List of birds of Estonia
- List of fishes of Estonia
- List of butterflies of Estonia
- List of moths of Estonia
- List of Odonata of Estonia
