= Caspian barbastelle =

Scientific classification
- Kingdom: Animalia
- Phylum: Chordata
- Class: Mammalia
- Order: Chiroptera
- Family: Vespertilionidae
- Genus: Barbastella
- Species: B. caspica

Binomial name
- Barbastella caspica Satunin, 1908

Species of bat

The Caspian barbastelle (Barbastella caspica) is a species of vesper bat found in Western and Central Asia. Its range includes Armenia, Azerbaijan, Iran, and the Russian republic Dagestan.
