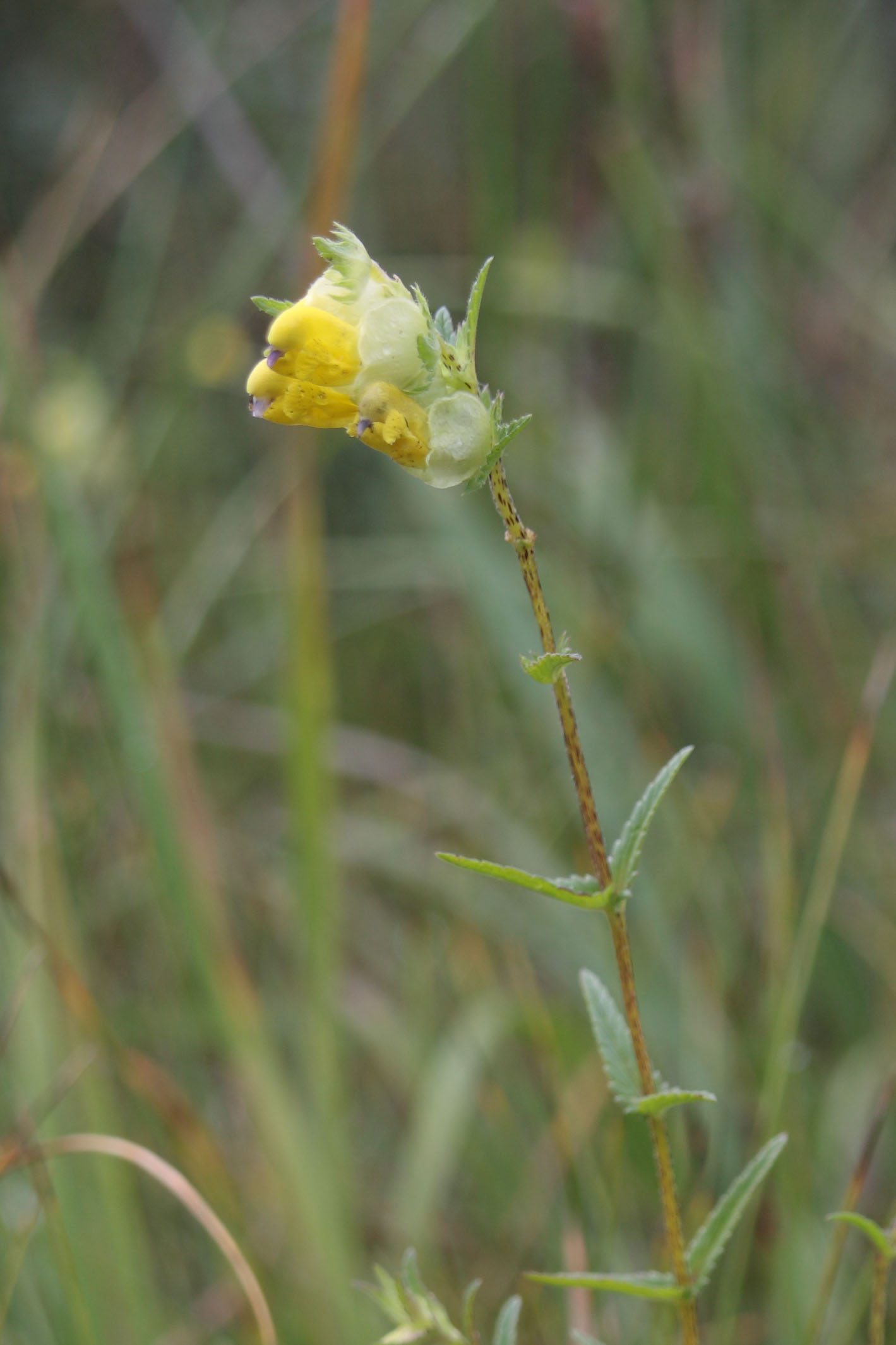

Scientific classification
- Kingdom: Plantae
- Clade: Embryophytes
- Clade: Tracheophytes
- Clade: Spermatophytes
- Clade: Angiosperms
- Clade: Eudicots
- Clade: Asterids
- Order: Lamiales
- Family: Orobanchaceae
- Genus: Rhinanthus
- Species: R. osiliensis

Binomial name
- Rhinanthus osiliensis (Ronn. et Saars.) Vassilcz.

= Rhinanthus osiliensis =

Saaremaa yellow rattle

Species of flowering plant in the broomrape family

Rhinanthus osiliensis, in English known by the common name Saaremaa yellow rattle, is a flowering plant in the genus Rhinanthus in the family Orobanchaceae. It is endemic to the Estonian island Saaremaa in the Baltic Sea. Plants growing on the Swedish island Gotland have been ascribed to R. osiliensis, too, but genetic analyses have not supported this hypothesis.

Morphological features of R. osiliensis include glandular hairs on the sepals (calyx) and relatively narrow leaves. It is a late-flowering species of Rhinanthus, flowering from the end of July onwards.

== Habitat, distribution, and ecology ==
Rhinanthus osiliensis is strictly endemic to the western part of Saaremaa island, Estonia, with a highly restricted geographic range. The species is a habitat specialist that primarily inhabits calcareous spring fens, which are naturally scarce wetland habitats. It also occurs in other wetland environments such as species-rich fens and paludified meadows. The plant can temporarily colonize marginal habitats like ditch verges and stream banks, though such populations tend to be transient.

As an annual hemiparasitic plant, R. osiliensis attaches to and derives nutrients from the roots of perennial herbaceous host plants. The species typically begins flowering in the second half of July and early August, with pollination carried out by insects, particularly bumblebees. Its seeds, which ripen by late September or early October, are relatively large and heavy, lacking an active dispersal mechanism. Consequently, most offspring are found in close proximity to the parent plant. The seeds generally maintain viability for only one year, and the species does not form a persistent seed bank.

The population of R. osiliensis was estimated at about 26,000–32,000 individuals as of 2010, distributed across several dozen established populations. Many of these populations are located within nature reserves. The species faces significant habitat challenges, as spring fens have lost about two-thirds of their total cover since the 1950s due to drainage activities. Also, the surrounding landscape has undergone considerable change, with a substantial increase in forest cover that may impede gene flow between populations by hindering the movement of pollinators.

Research has shown that R. osiliensis populations show relatively high levels of inbreeding and have experienced genetic bottlenecks, likely resulting from habitat loss and fragmentation. The species' short life cycle and specific habitat requirements make it particularly vulnerable to landscape changes, with both the loss of suitable wetland habitats and the increase in forest cover posing serious threats to its long-term persistence.
