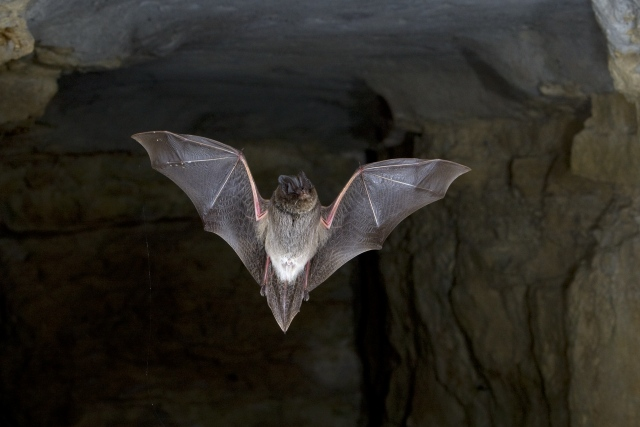

Conservation status
- Near Threatened (IUCN 3.1)

Scientific classification
- Kingdom: Animalia
- Phylum: Chordata
- Class: Mammalia
- Order: Chiroptera
- Family: Vespertilionidae
- Genus: Barbastella
- Species: B. barbastellus

Binomial name
- Barbastella barbastellus (Schreber, 1774)
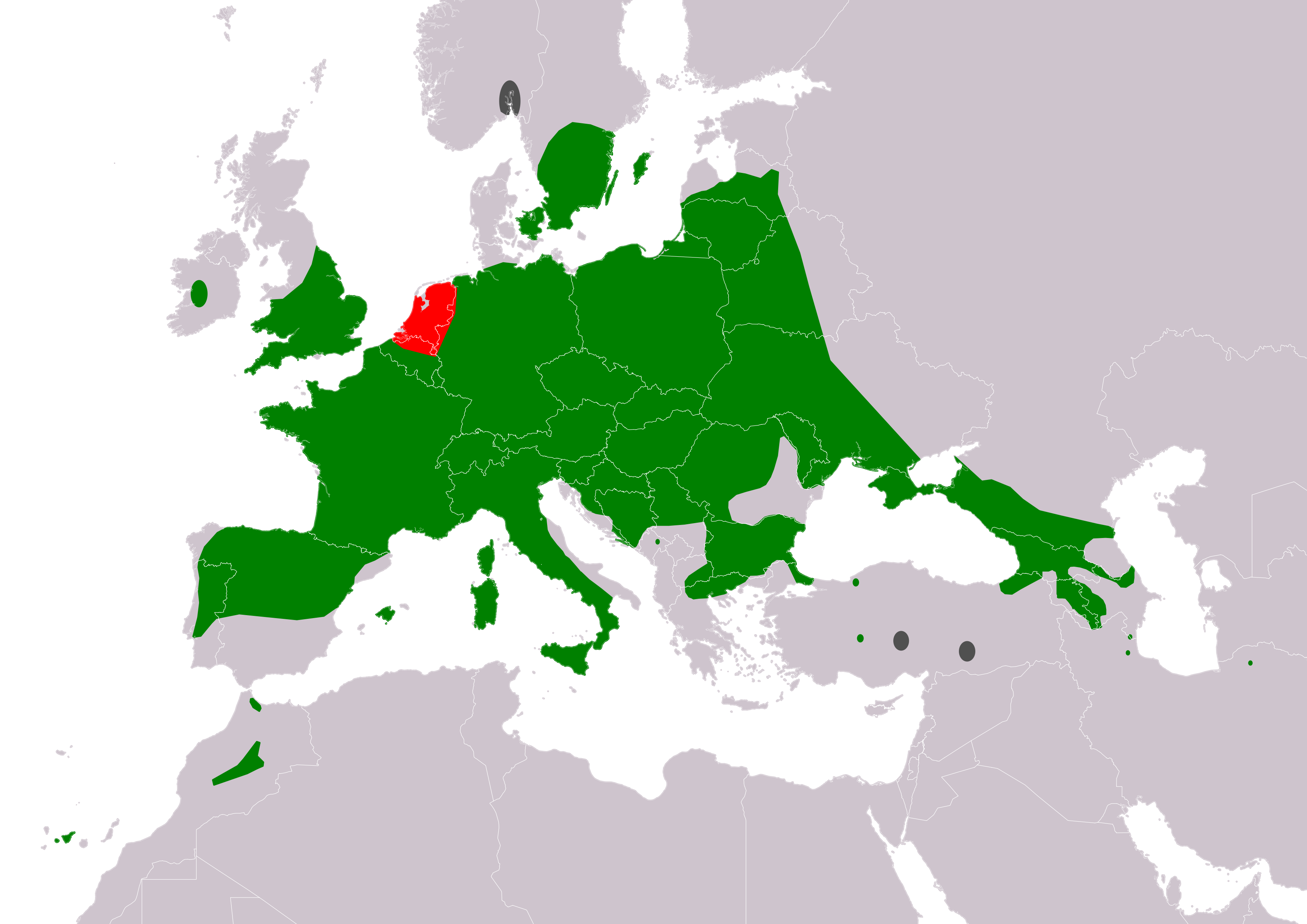
- Range of B. barbastella Resident Extinct Presence Uncertain

= Western barbastelle =

Western barbastelle Temporal range: Pleistocene – Recent

Species of bat

The western barbastelle (Barbastella barbastellus), also known as the barbastelle or barbastelle bat, is a European bat in the genus Barbastella. This species is found from Portugal to Azerbaijan and from Sweden to Canary Islands, where a sub-species was identified. It has a short nose, small eyes and wide ears. The conservation status of B. barbastellus is assessed as "near threatened", "vulnerable", "critically endangered" or "extinct" in various parts of its range.

== Taxonomy ==
The western barbastelle was described as a new species in 1774 by Johann Christian Daniel von Schreber, who placed it in the genus Vespertilio, with a species name of Vespertilio barbastellus. The holotype had been collected in Burgundy, France. In 1836 it was placed in the genus Barbastellus, and the first use of its current name combination of Barbastella barbastellus was in 1897 by Gerrit Smith Miller Jr. The name Barbastella barbastellus might be coming from the Latin barba (beard) and stella (star). Viewed from the side, it seems that the upper lip has a beard, or a moustache.

Two subspecies are recognized by Mammal Species of the World (2005):

- Barbastella barbastellus barbastellus: distributed from western Europe until the Caucasus, with isolated populations in Morocco
- Barbastella barbastellus guanchae: only found in the islands of Tenerife and La Gomera, Canary Islands, Spain

In addition to morphological measurement, DNA analysis confirmed the presence of an endemic sub-species in the Canary Islands as well as a relatively homogeneous genetic structure among populations of the Iberian Peninsula and Morocco, and probably, across Europe as far as the Thrace region.

== Description ==
The barbastelle is a medium-sized bat, with a characteristic pug-shaped nose. The ears are broad, joined across its head by skin, and covered in gingery-brown fur on the rear surface. The tragus is triangular – broad at the base but with a nearly parallel tip which starts about halfway along its length. Head and body length is between 40 and 55 mm and wingspan is between 26 and 29 cm (10 and 11 in). Forearm length is 3.5 to 4.5 cm (1.4 to 1.8 in) and body mass is 6 to 13 g (0.21 to 0.46 oz).

== Ecology ==
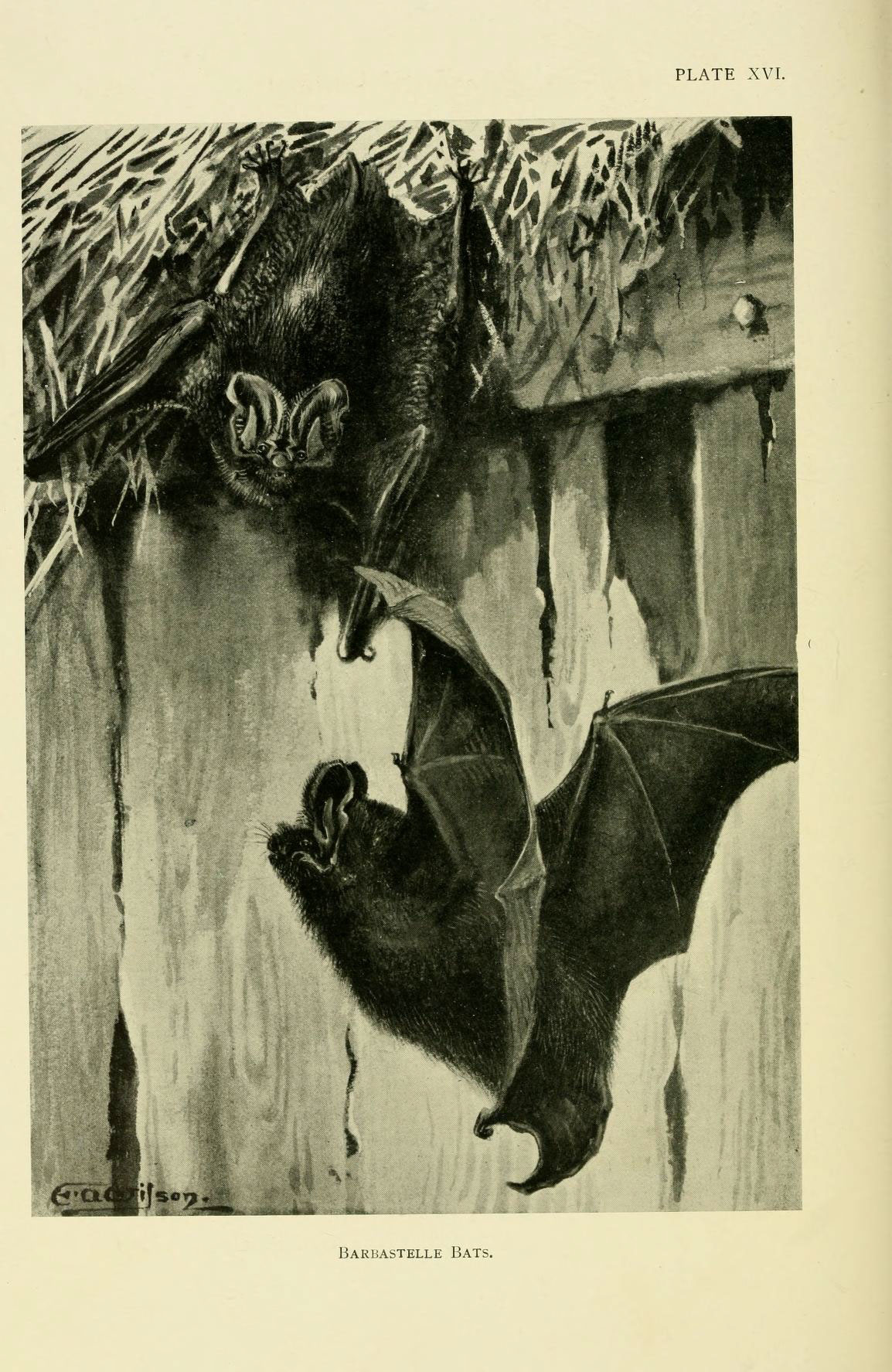
Illustration of roosting barbastelles

=== Habitat ===
Barbastelles roost in splits or behind loose bark of trees all year, generally in mature deciduous forests, as well as rock crevices and within human buildings. In central Italy, tall dead beech in unmanaged woodland were found to be preferred as roost trees. While barbastelles typically remain within a single roosting area, they move between individual roosts with great frequency.

Barbastelles migrate to underground roosting sites over the winter, although they may stay within arboreal roosts in the beginning of the season. Winter roosting sites include natural caves and human structures such as basements, mines and bunkers. Barbastelles are relatively resistant to cold conditions, and are typically found hibernating in cold sites and in exposed positions.

=== Hunting and feeding ===
Barbastelles feed chiefly on moths, as well as on flies. Research from Switzerland showed that the biologically most productive parts of the forest are exploited in priority by this species while hunting and that ca. 99% of prey by volume consisted of Lepidoptera. More recent studies confirmed this predominance of Lepidoptera, underlining that medium-sized and larger specimens are targeted in priority by the barbastelles. However, seasonal diet changes were recorded during autumn due to potential interspecific competition with Plecotus austriacus and strong decrease of flying larger moths.

The diet of the barbastelles appears to be one of the narrowest among European bats. This specialization in foraging habits probably points to a higher vulnerability of this species to negative changes in the abundance of moth populations. This could explain its current rarity throughout most of its range.

While foraging, barbastelles behave as typical aerial-hawking bat species despite the fact that they hunt exclusively just above the forest canopy. This peculiar foraging technique could be explained by the co-evolution with the defence system of its prey.

Specimens can travel up to 20 km per night for foraging purposes and nonreproductive females forage at greater distances than reproductive females

=== Reproduction ===
Individuals reach their sexual maturity after one or two years. After total sexual segregation during most of spring and summer, the mating period starts at the end of summer, sometimes during swarming episodes. The mating period is often finishing with the start of the hibernation, but some cases of late mating during winter and early spring have been observed Around May–June, each pregnant female gives birth to one or two newborn juveniles which she breastfeeds up to 6 weeks.

=== Echolocation ===
The barbastelle has two main call types used for echolocation. The frequency parameters of call type 1 lie between 30 and 38 kHz, have most energy at 33 kHz and have an average duration of 2.5 ms. The frequency parameters of call type 2 lie between 29 and 47 kHz, have most energy at 38 kHz and have an average duration of 4.1 ms.

== Distribution ==
This species is rare and most of the time decreasing throughout its range. Some historical data from the 19th century refers to the presence of western barbastelles in Senegal. This data is considered as doubtful.

Albania
So far, only four specimens of this species were recorded in Albania. The specimens were caught in 2005 near the Shebenik-Jabllanicë National Park, close to the border with North Macedonia. This national park is well known for its beech forest, part of the UNESCO site "Ancient and Primeval Beech Forests of the Carpathians and Other Regions of Europe".

Belgium
Barbastelle bats are known to occur within the Sonian Forest of Belgium.

Ireland
This species was reported in 1997 from the west coast of Ireland, based on echolocation calls. Recent surveys and researches assessed this data and concluded to a mis-identification of the echolocation calls, and the absence of this species from the island of Ireland.:

Italy
It is present throughout Italy, including the islands.

Montenegro
The species is present during summer in both Mediterranean and Alpine biogeographic region of Montenegro, on altitudes as low as 80 m and up to 1.700 m a.s.l.

Netherlands
The barbastelle has been extinct in the Netherlands since 1984.

Norway
It was considered extirpated in Norway, having only been sighted in 1896, 1911, 1913 and 1949. However, it was again found in 2004 and 2008.

United Kingdom
In Britain, only a few breeding roosts are known; Paston Great Barn in Norfolk, parts of Exmoor and the Quantock Hills in Devon and Somerset (see Tarr Steps), Wimpole Wood in Cambridgeshire, the Mottisfont woodland in Hampshire and Ebernoe Common in West Sussex. The UK distribution can be found on the National Biodiversity Network website here.

== Conservation ==
This species is protected in the European Union under the Habitats Directive, meaning that habitats and roosts use by this species may be considered for notification as a Site of Special Scientific Interest. This species is also listed in the Berne Convention and is specifically targeted by the UNEP-EUROBATS convention. Several national legislation are also protecting this species and its habitats in many countries and regions.

In order to highlight the importance of protecting this species at the European scale, this species was selected as bat species of the Year 2020-2021 by the pan-European NGO BatLife Europe.

=== Status ===
This species is classified as near threatened (NT) in the worldwide IUCN Red List, while it is considered as vulnerable (VU) at the European and European Union scale and near threatened (NT) in the Mediterranean Red List.

National and regional Red List status of the western barbastelle
Country	National	Regional
Albania	Data deficient (DD)	N/A
Austria	Vulnerable (VU)	N/A
Belarus	Endangered (EN) (2016)	N/A
Belgium	Critically endangered (CR)	Flanders: regionally extinct (RE); Wallonia: critically endangered (CR)
Croatia	Data deficient (DD) (2006)	N/A
Czech Republic	Least concern (LC) (2017)	N/A
Denmark	Vulnerable (VU) (2008)	N/A
Estonia	Not evaluated (NE) (2008)	N/A
France	Least concern (LC)	Alsace (2014): vulnerable (VU); Auvergne (2015): vulnerable (VU); Burgundy (2015): near threatened (NT); Brittany (2015): near threatened (NT); Centre-Val de Loire (2013): near threatened (NT); Upper Normandy (2013): vulnerable (VU); Île-de-France (2017): critically endangered (CR); Picardy (2016): endangered (EN); Poitou-Charentes (2018): least concern (LC); Rhône-Alpes (2015): least concern (LC)
Georgia	Vulnerable (VU) (2006)	N/A
Germany	Endangered (EN) (2008)	N/A
Italy	Endangered (EN) (2013)	N/A
Lithuania	Endangered (EN)	N/A
Moldova	Critically endangered (CR)	N/A
The Netherlands	Regionally extinct (RE)	N/A
Norway	Critically endangered (CR) (2015)	N/A
Poland	Data deficient (DD) (2013)	N/A
Portugal	Data deficient (DD) (2005)	N/A
Romania	Not evaluated (NE)	N/A
Switzerland	Endangered (EN) (2014)	N/A
Ukraine	Endangered (EN)	N/A
United Kingdom	Vulnerable (VU) (2017)	N/A

== Literature cited ==
- Andreas, Michal; Reiter, Antonín; Benda, Petr (2012). "Prey Selection and Seasonal Diet Changes in the Western Barbastelle Bat (Barbastella barbastellus)". Acta Chiropterologica. 14: 81–92. doi:10.3161/150811012X654295. S2CID 83484297.
- Aulagnier, S.; Haffner, P.; Mitchell-Jones, T.; Moutou, F.; Zima, J. (2010). Guide des mammifères d'Europe, d'Afrique du Nord et du Moyen-Orient [Mammals of Europe, North Africa and the Middle East] (in French). Delachaux & Niestlé. ISBN 978-2-603-01702-9.
- Guido Reiter; Danilo Russo; Kit Stoner; Philippe Théou; Bat Conservation Trust (2019). Bat Species of the Year 2020-2021: The Barbastelle (Barbastella barbastellus) (Report). BatLife Europe.
- Buckley, D.J.; Puechmaille, S.J.; Roche, N.; Teeling, E. C. (2011). "A critical assessment of the presence of Barbastella barbastellus and Nyctalus noctula in Ireland with a description of N. leisleri echolocation calls from Ireland". Hystrix: The Italian Journal of Mammalogy. 22 (1).
- Denzinger, Annette; Siemers, Björn; Schaub, Andrea; Schnitzler, Hans-Ulrich (2001). "Echolocation by the barbastelle bat, Barbastella barbastellus". Journal of Comparative Physiology A: Sensory, Neural, and Behavioral Physiology. 187 (7): 521–528. doi:10.1007/s003590100223. PMID 11730299. S2CID 41365164.
- Dietz, Christian; von Helversen, Otto; Nill (2009). L'encyclopédie des chauves-souris d'Europe et d'Afrique du Nord: Biologie, caractéristiques, protection [Bats of Europe and North Africa] (in French). Delachaux & Niestlé. ISBN 978-2-603-01595-7.
- Juste, Javier; Ibáñez, Carlos; Trujillo, Domingo; Muñoz, Joaquín; Ruedi, Manuel (2003). "Phylogeography of Barbastelle Bats (Barbastella barbastellus) in the Western Mediterranean and the Canary Islands". Acta Chiropterologica. 5 (2): 165–175. doi:10.3161/001.005.0201. hdl:10261/48665. S2CID 85883914.
- Juste, Javier; Ibáñez, Carlos; Trujillo, Domingo; Muñoz, Joaquín; Ruedi, Manuel (2003). "Phylogeography of Barbastelle Bats (Barbastella barbastellus) in the Western Mediterranean and the Canary Islands". Acta Chiropterologica. 5 (2): 165–175. doi:10.3161/001.005.0201. hdl:10261/48665. S2CID 85883914.
- Obrist, Martin K.; Boesch, Ruedi; Flückiger, Peter F. (2004). "Variability in echolocation call design of 26 Swiss bat species: Consequences, limits and options for automated field identification with a synergetic pattern recognition approach" (PDF). Mammalia. 68 (4): 307–322. doi:10.1515/mamm.2004.030. S2CID 86180828.
- Parsons, S.; Jones, G. (2000). "Acoustic identification of twelve species of echolocating bat by discriminant function analysis and artificial neural networks". Journal of Experimental Biology. 203 (17): 2641–2656. Bibcode:2000JExpB.203.2641P. doi:10.1242/jeb.203.17.2641. PMID 10934005.
- Pašić, Jasmin; Mulaomerovic, Jasminko (2018). "Barbastella barbastellus – novi lokaliteti, 2017. – 2018. Crna gora" [Barbastella barbastellus – new sites, 2017 – 2018, Montenegro] (PDF) (in Croatian). 3 (2): 37–40.
- Rachwald, A.; Kokurewicz, T.; Zapart, A.; Apoznański, G.; Szurlej, M.; Haddow, J.; Đurović, M.; Kepel, A. (2019). "New Records of the Western Barbastelle Barbastella barbastellus (Schreber, 1774) and Other Rare Bat Species in Montenegro" (PDF). Acta Zoologica Bulgarica. 71 (4): 519–524.
- Rochebrune A.T. (1883). "Faune de Sénégambie. Mammifères". Société Linéenne de Bordeaux. 37: 49–204.
- Russo, D.; Cistrone, L.; Jones, G.; Mazzoleni, S. (2004). "Roost selection by barbastelle bats (Barbastella barbastellus, Chiroptera: Vespertilionidae) in beech woodlands of central Italy: consequences for conservation" (PDF). Biological Conservation. 117 (1): 73–81. Bibcode:2004BCons.117...73R. doi:10.1016/S0006-3207(03)00266-0.
- Rydell J., Bogdanowicz W. (1997). "Barbastella barbastellus". Mammalian Species. 557: 1–8. doi:10.2307/3504499. JSTOR 3504499.
- Rydell, J.; Natuschke, G.; Theiler, A.; Zingg, P.E. (1996). "Food habits of the barbastelle bat Barbastella barbastellus". Ecography. 19 (1): 62–66. Bibcode:1996Ecogr..19...62R. doi:10.1111/j.1600-0587.1996.tb00155.x.
- Sachanowicz, K.; Ciechanowski, M.; Rachwald, A.; Piskorski, M. (2016). "Overview of bat species reported in Albania with the first country records for eight species". Journal of Natural History. 50 (7–8): 513–521. Bibcode:2016JNatH..50..513S. doi:10.1080/00222933.2015.1059962.
- Sierro A (1999). "Habitat selection by barbastelle bats (Barbastella barbastellus) in the Swiss Alps (Valais)" (PDF). Journal of Zoology. 248 (4): 429–432. doi:10.1111/j.1469-7998.1999.tb01042.x.
- Sierro, A.; Arlettaz, R. (1997). "Barbastelle bats (Barbastella spp.) specialize in the predation of moths: implications for foraging tactics and conservation". Acta Oecologica. 18 (2): 91–106. Bibcode:1997AcO....18...91S. doi:10.1016/S1146-609X(97)80067-7.
- Temple, H.J. and Terry, A. (Compilers). 2007. The Status and Distribution of European Mammals Archived 27 April 2022 at the Wayback Machine.Luxembourg: Office for Official Publications of the European Communities. viii + 48pp, 210 x 297 mm
- Temple, H.J. and Cuttelod, A. (Compilers). 2009. The Status and Distribution of Mediterranean Mammals. Gland, Switzerland and Cambridge, UK: IUCN. vii+32pp.
- Théou, P. & Bego, F. 2018. Bats of Albania. NaturAl Project. 124pp
- Trujillo, D.; Ibáñez, C.; Juste, J. (2002). "A new subspecies of Barbastella barbastellus (Mammalia: Chiroptera: Vespertilionidae) from the Canary Islands". Revue suisse de Zoologie. 109 (3): 543–550. doi:10.5962/bhl.part.79609. hdl:10261/48755.
- Yager DD (2012). "Predator detection and evasion by flying insects". Curr Opin Neurobiol. 22 (2): 201–7. doi:10.1016/j.conb.2011.12.011. PMID 22226428..
- Zeale, M.R.; Davidson-Watts, I.; Jones, G. (2012). "Home range use and habitat selection by barbastelle bats (Barbastella barbastellus): implications for conservation". Journal of Mammalogy. 93 (4): 1110–1118. doi:10.1644/11-MAMM-A-366.1.
