= List of mammals of Metropolitan France =

This list shows the IUCN Red List status of the 120 mammal species occurring in Metropolitan France. One of them is critically endangered, two are endangered, thirteen are vulnerable, and four are near threatened. One of the species listed for France is considered to be extinct.

Icons which state each species' global IUCN status:
| EX | Extinct | No reasonable doubt that the last individual has died |
| CR | Critically Endangered | In imminent risk of extinction in the wild |
| EN | Endangered | Facing an extremely high risk of extinction in the wild |
| VU | Vulnerable | Facing a high risk of extinction in the wild |
| NT | Near Threatened | Doesn't meet any criteria that would categorise it as risking extinction but likely to in the future |
| LC | Least Concern | No current identifiable risks to this species |
| DD | Data Deficient | Inadequate information to make an assessment of the risks to this species |

== Order: Rodentia (rodents) ==
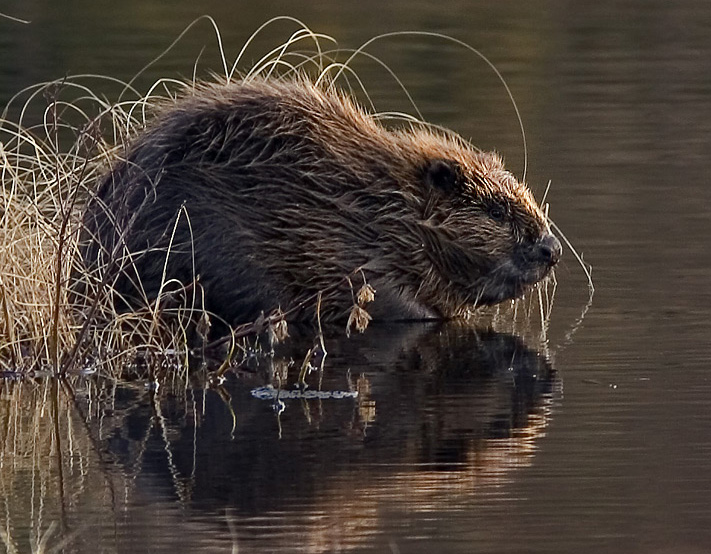
European beaver

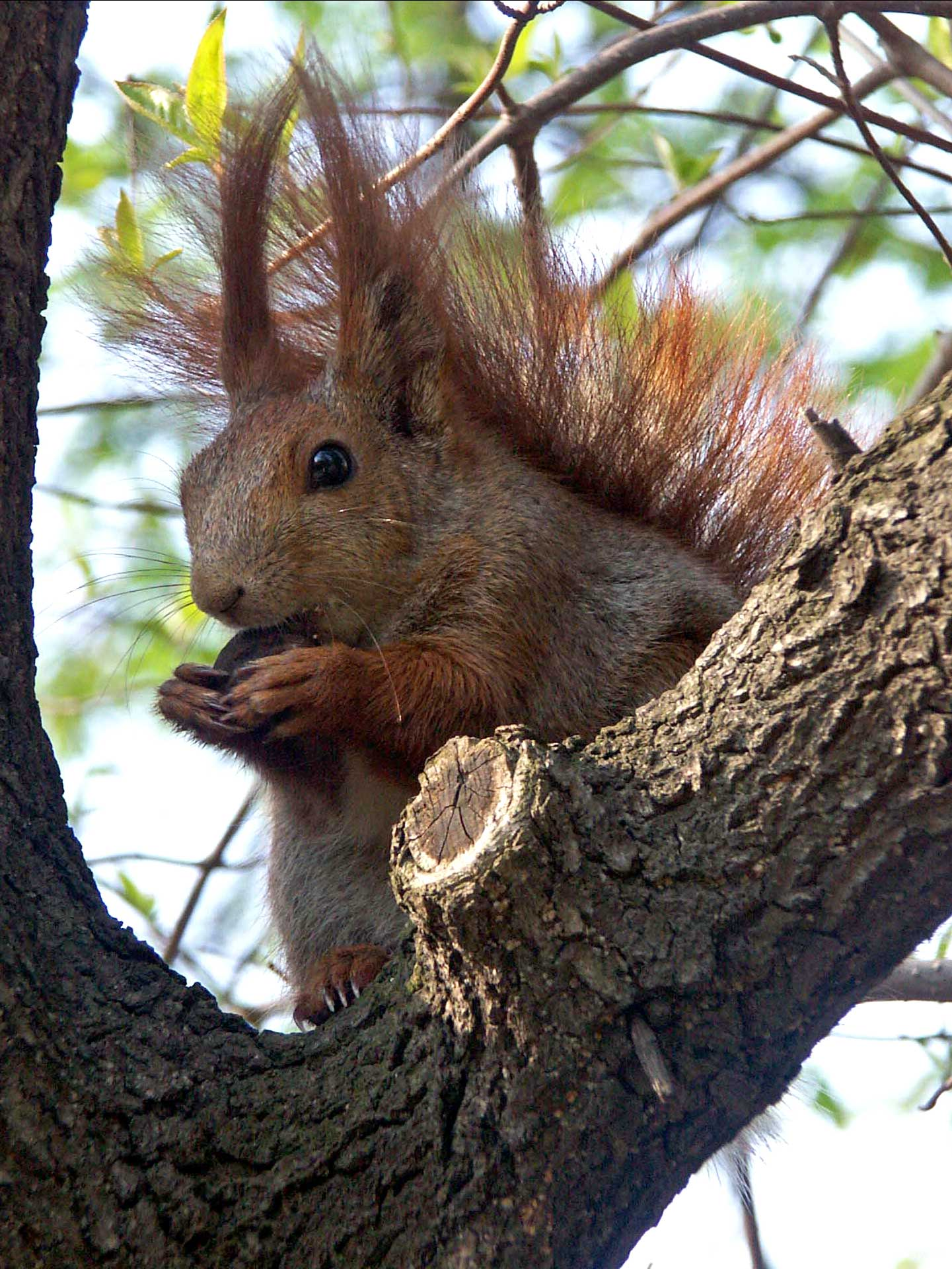
Red squirrel

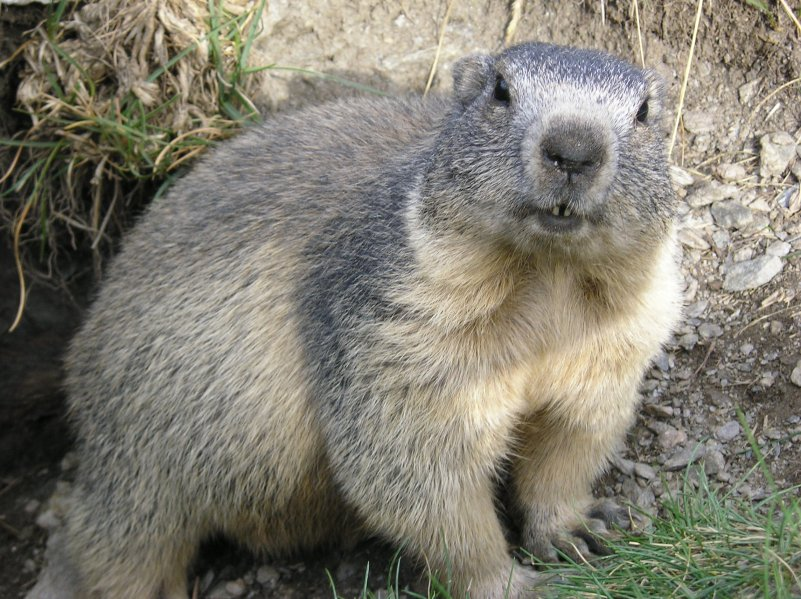
Alpine marmot

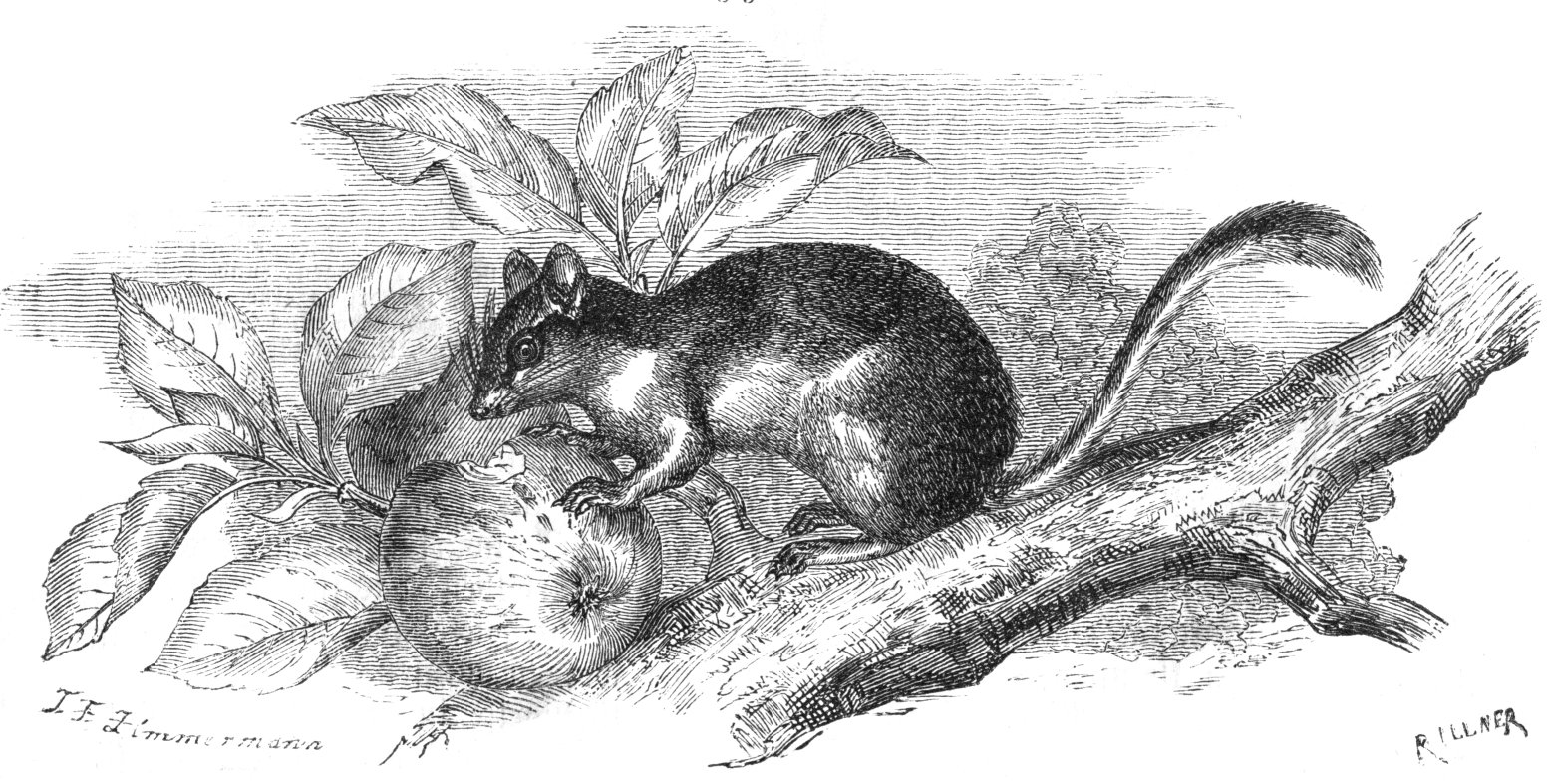
Garden dormouse

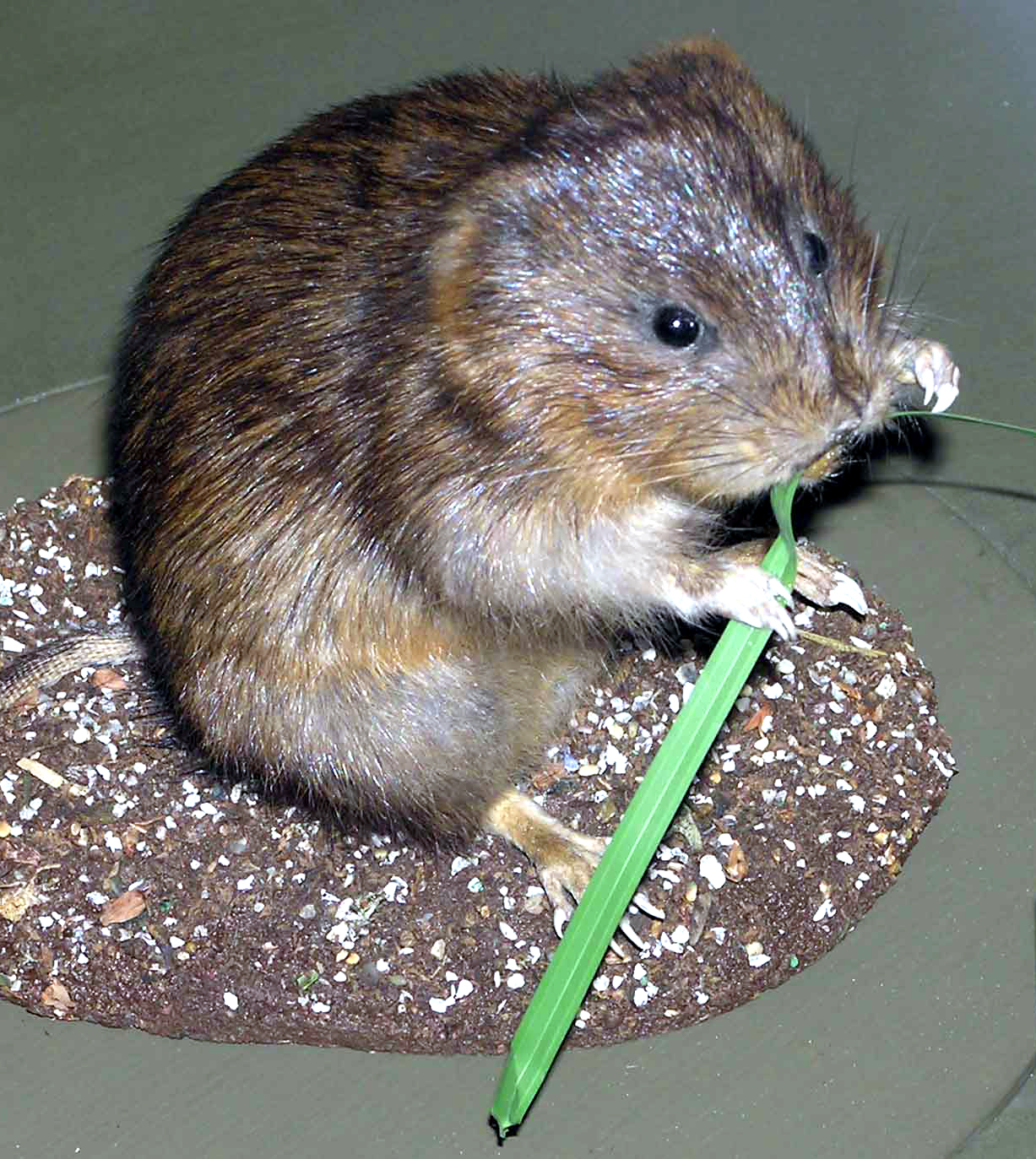
European water vole

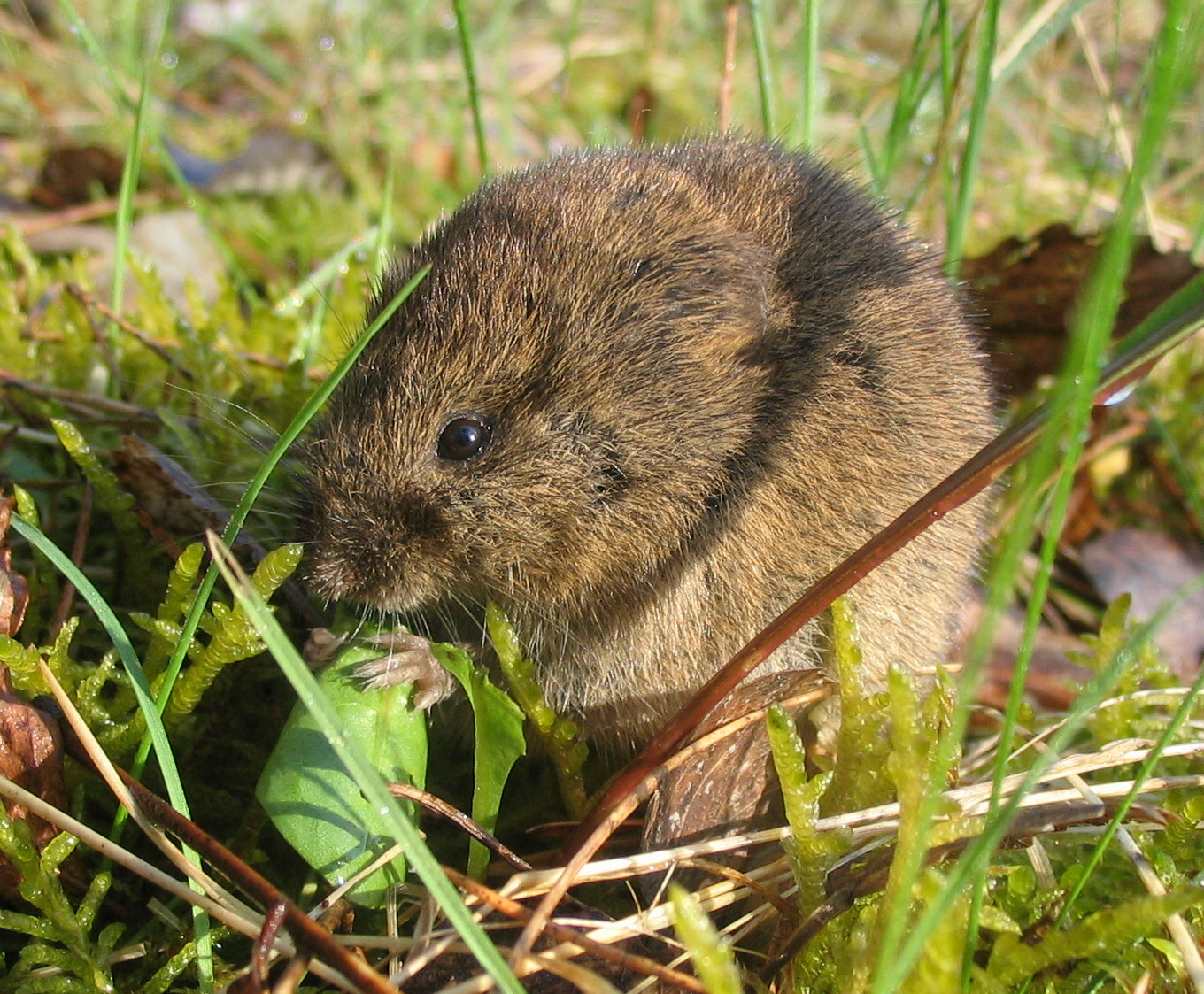
Common vole

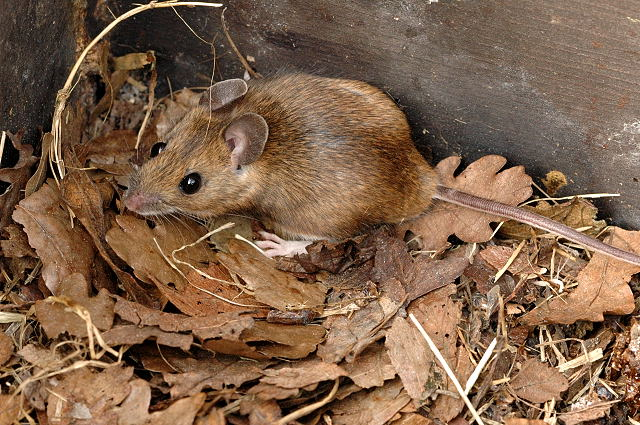
Yellow-necked mouse

Rodents make up the largest order of mammals, with over 40% of mammalian species. They have two incisors in the upper and lower jaw which grow continually and must be kept short by gnawing. Most rodents are small though the capybara can weigh up to 45 kg (99 lb).

- Suborder: Sciurognathi
  - Family: Castoridae (beavers)
    - Genus: Castor
      - Eurasian beaver, C. fiber LC
      - North American beaver, C. canadensis LC introduced, extirpated
  - Family: Sciuridae (squirrels)
    - Subfamily: Sciurinae
      - Genus: Sciurus
        - Red squirrel, S. vulgaris LC
    - Subfamily: Xerinae
      - Genus: Marmota
        - Alpine marmot, M. marmota LC
  - Family: Gliridae (dormice)
    - Subfamily: Leithiinae
      - Genus: Eliomys
        - Garden dormouse, E. quercinus NT
      - Genus: Muscardinus
        - Hazel dormouse, M. avellanarius LC
    - Subfamily: Glirinae
      - Genus: Glis
        - European edible dormouse, G. glis LC
  - Family: Cricetidae
    - Subfamily: Cricetinae
      - Genus: Cricetus
        - European hamster, C. cricetus CR
    - Subfamily: Arvicolinae
      - Genus: Arvicola
        - European water vole, A. amphibius LC
        - Southwestern water vole, A. sapidus NT
      - Genus: Chionomys
        - Snow vole, C. nivalis LC
      - Genus: Clethrionomys
        - Bank vole, C. glareolus LC
      - Genus: Microtus
        - Field vole, M. agrestis LC
        - Common vole, M. arvalis LC
        - Cabrera's vole, M. cabrerae NT
        - Mediterranean pine vole, M. duodecimcostatus LC
        - Gerbe's vole, M. gerbei LC
        - Lusitanian pine vole, M. lusitanicus LC
        - Alpine pine vole, M. multiplex LC
        - Savi's pine vole, M. savii LC
        - European pine vole, M. subterraneus LC
  - Family: Muridae (mice, rats, voles, gerbils, hamsters, etc.)
    - Subfamily: Murinae
      - Genus: Mus
        - House mouse, M. musculus LC
        - Algerian mouse, M. spretus LC
      - Genus: Apodemus
        - Alpine field mouse, A. alpicola LC
        - Yellow-necked mouse, A. flavicollis LC
        - Wood mouse, A. sylvaticus LC
      - Genus: Micromys
        - Eurasian harvest mouse, M. minutus LC
      - Genus: Rattus
        - Brown rat, R. norvegicus LC introduced
        - Black rat, R. rattus LC introduced

== Order: Lagomorpha (lagomorphs) ==
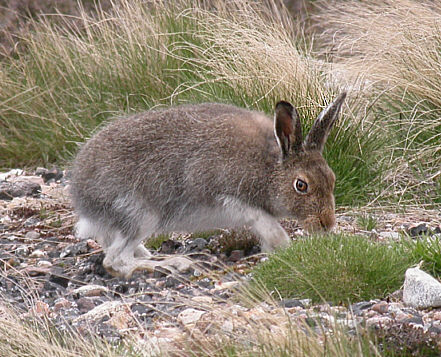
Mountain hare

The lagomorphs comprise two families, Leporidae (hares and rabbits), and Ochotonidae (pikas). Though they can resemble rodents, and were classified as a superfamily in that order until the early 20th century, they have since been considered a separate order. They differ from rodents in a number of physical characteristics, such as having four incisors in the upper jaw rather than two.

- Family: Leporidae (rabbits, hares)
  - Genus: Lepus
    - Corsican hare, L. corsicanus VU
    - European hare, L. europaeus LC
    - Mountain hare, L. timidus LC
  - Genus: Oryctolagus
    - European rabbit, O. cuniculus NT
- Family: Ochotonidae (pikas)
  - Genus: Prolagus
    - Sardinian pika, P. sardus EX

== Order: Eulipotyphla (hedgehogs, shrews and moles) ==
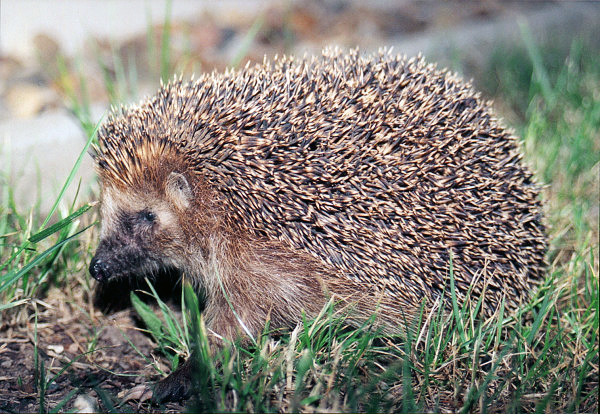
West European hedgehog

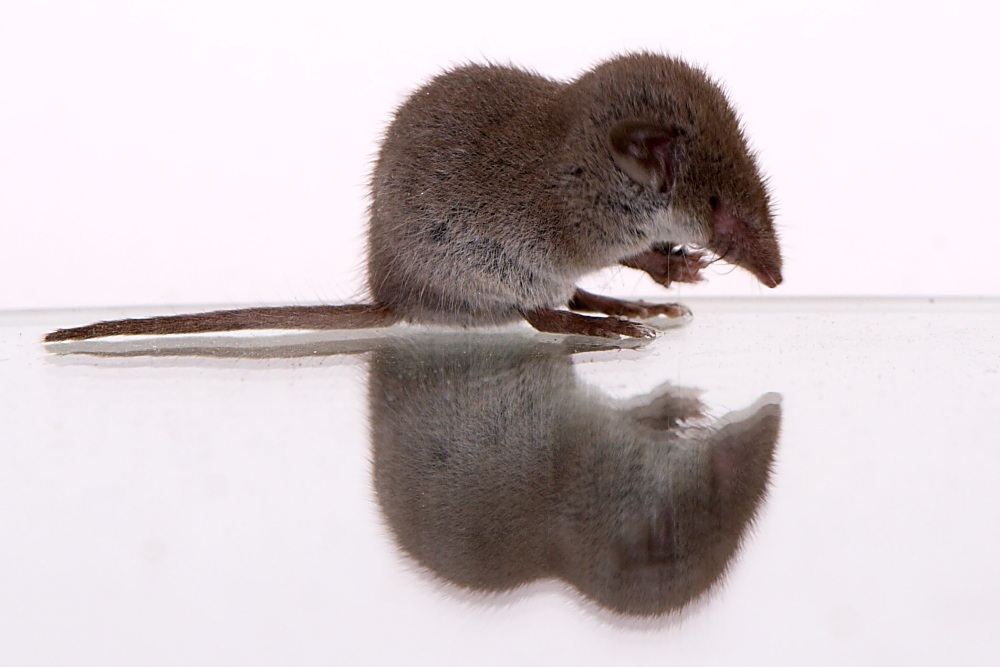
Lesser white-toothed shrew

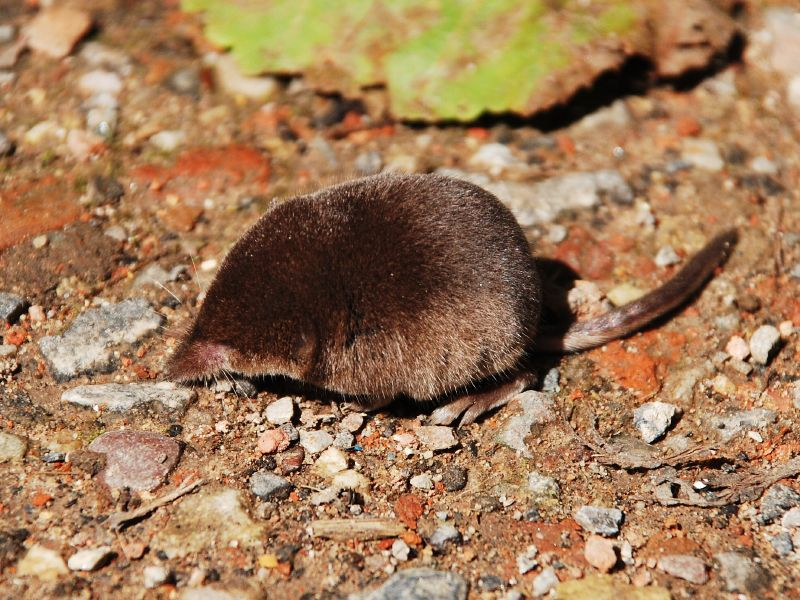
Eurasian pygmy shrew

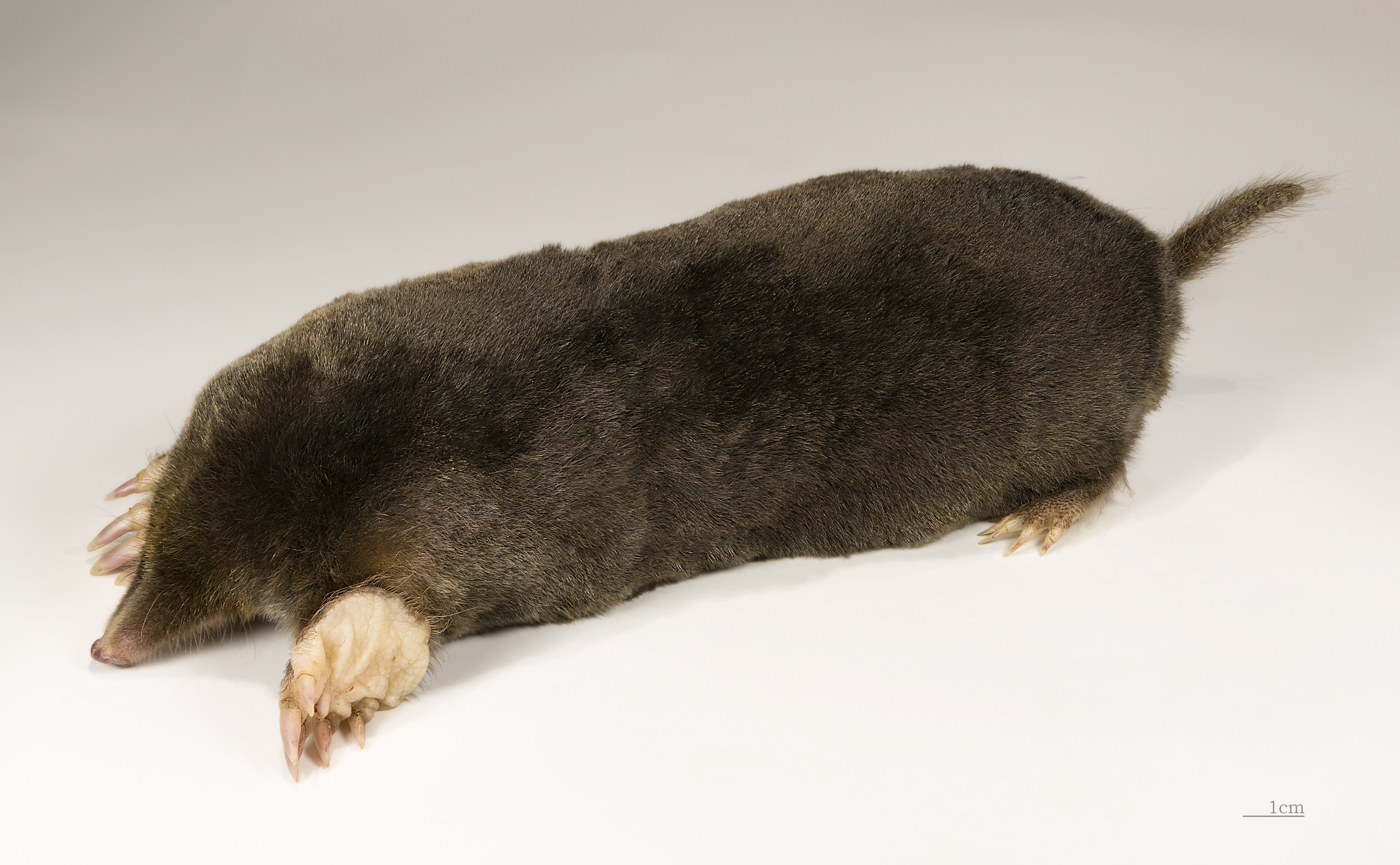
European mole

Hedgehogs are easily recognised by their spines, shrews closely resemble mice, and moles are stout-bodied burrowers.

- Family: Erinaceidae (hedgehogs and gymnures)
  - Subfamily: Erinaceinae
    - Genus: Atelerix
      - North African hedgehog, A. algirus LC extirpated
    - Genus: Erinaceus
      - West European hedgehog, E. europaeus NT
- Family: Soricidae (shrews)
  - Subfamily: Crocidurinae
    - Genus: Crocidura
      - Bicolored shrew, C. leucodon LC
      - Greater white-toothed shrew, C. russula LC
      - Lesser white-toothed shrew, C. suaveolens LC
    - Genus: Suncus
      - Etruscan shrew, S. etruscus LC
  - Subfamily: Soricinae
    - Tribe: Nectogalini
      - Genus: Neomys
        - Southern water shrew, N. anomalus LC
        - Eurasian water shrew, N. fodiens LC
    - Tribe: Soricini
      - Genus: Sorex
        - Alpine shrew, S. alpinus NT
        - Common shrew, S. araneus LC
        - Crowned shrew, S. coronatus LC
        - Eurasian pygmy shrew, S. minutus LC
- Family: Talpidae (moles)
  - Subfamily: Talpinae
    - Tribe: Desmanini
      - Genus: Galemys
        - Pyrenean desman, G. pyrenaicus EN
    - Tribe: Talpini
      - Genus: Talpa
        - Mediterranean mole, T. caeca LC
        - European mole, T. europaea LC
        - Roman mole, T. romana LC

== Order: Chiroptera (bats) ==
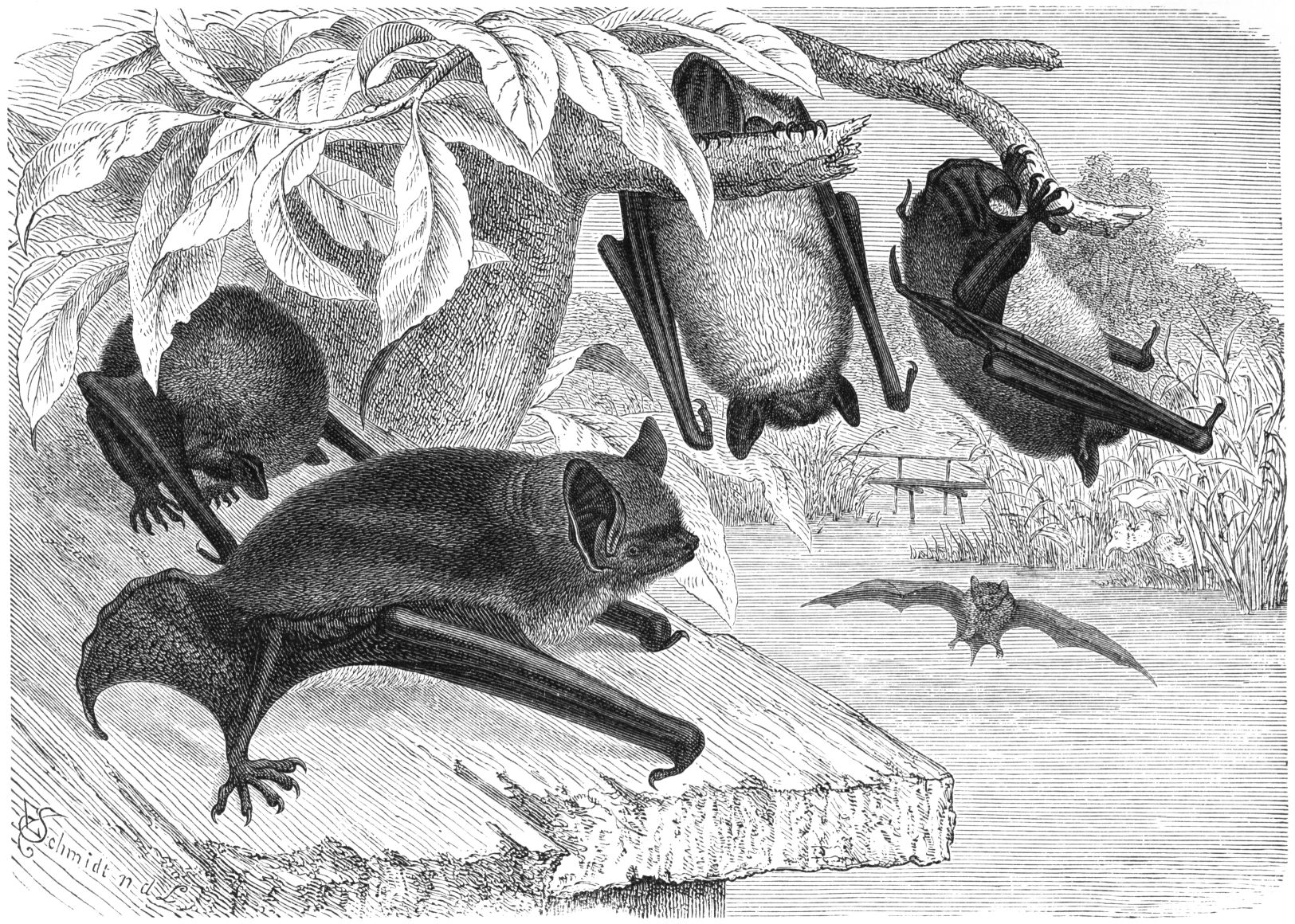
Daubenton's bats

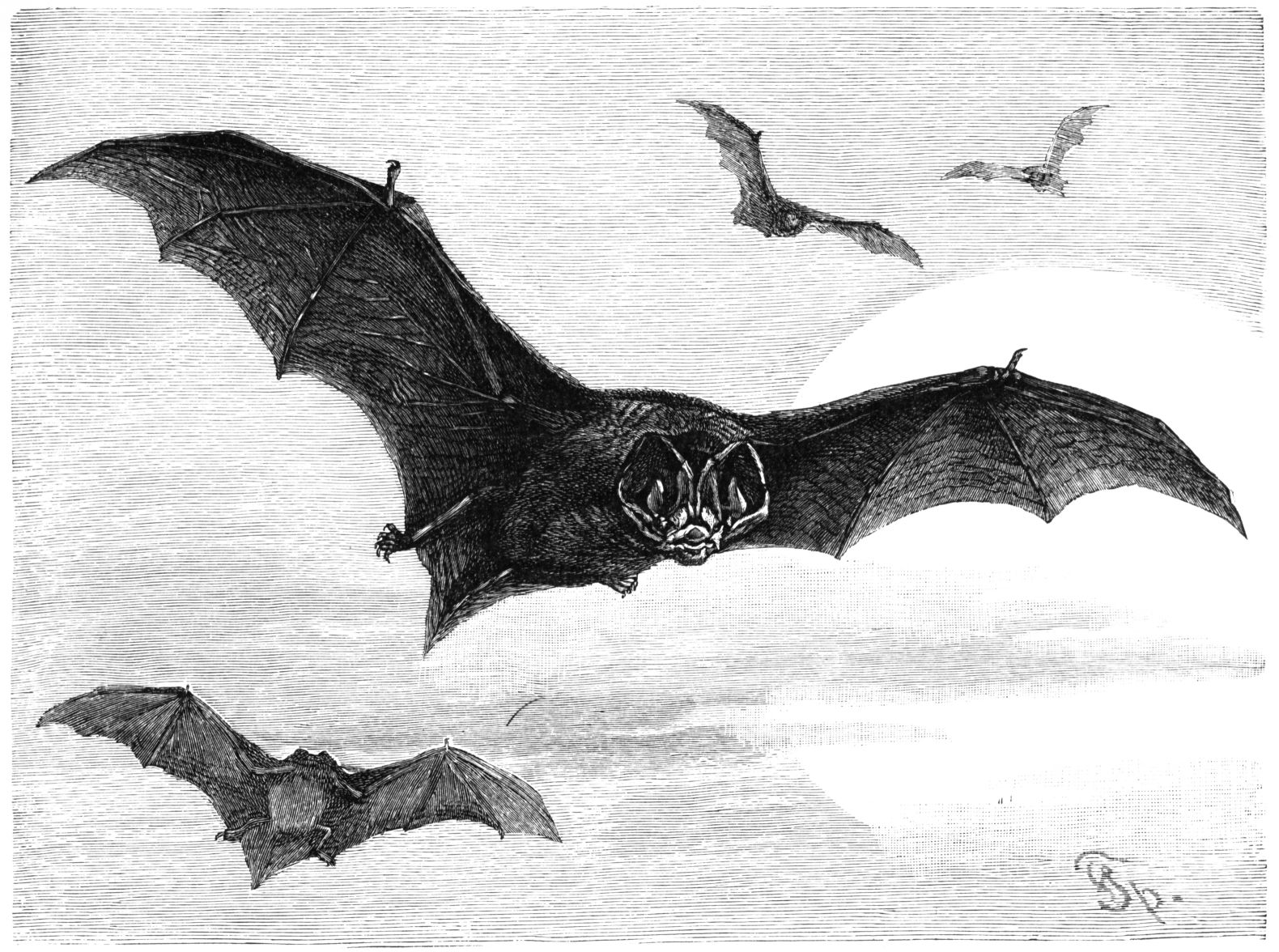
Barbastelles

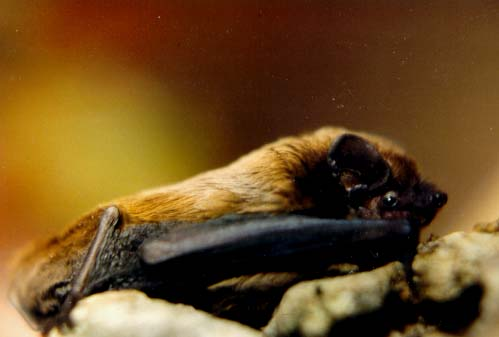
Lesser noctule

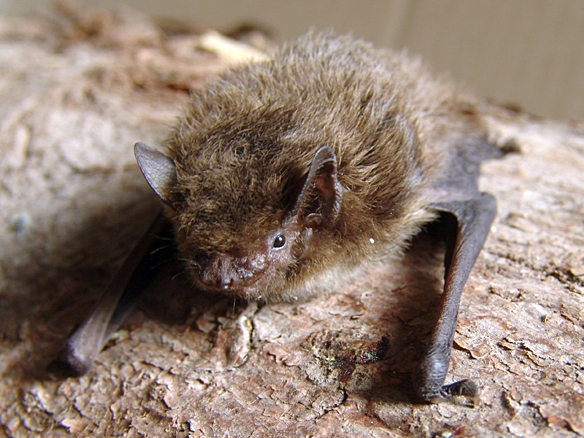
Nathusius' pipistrelle

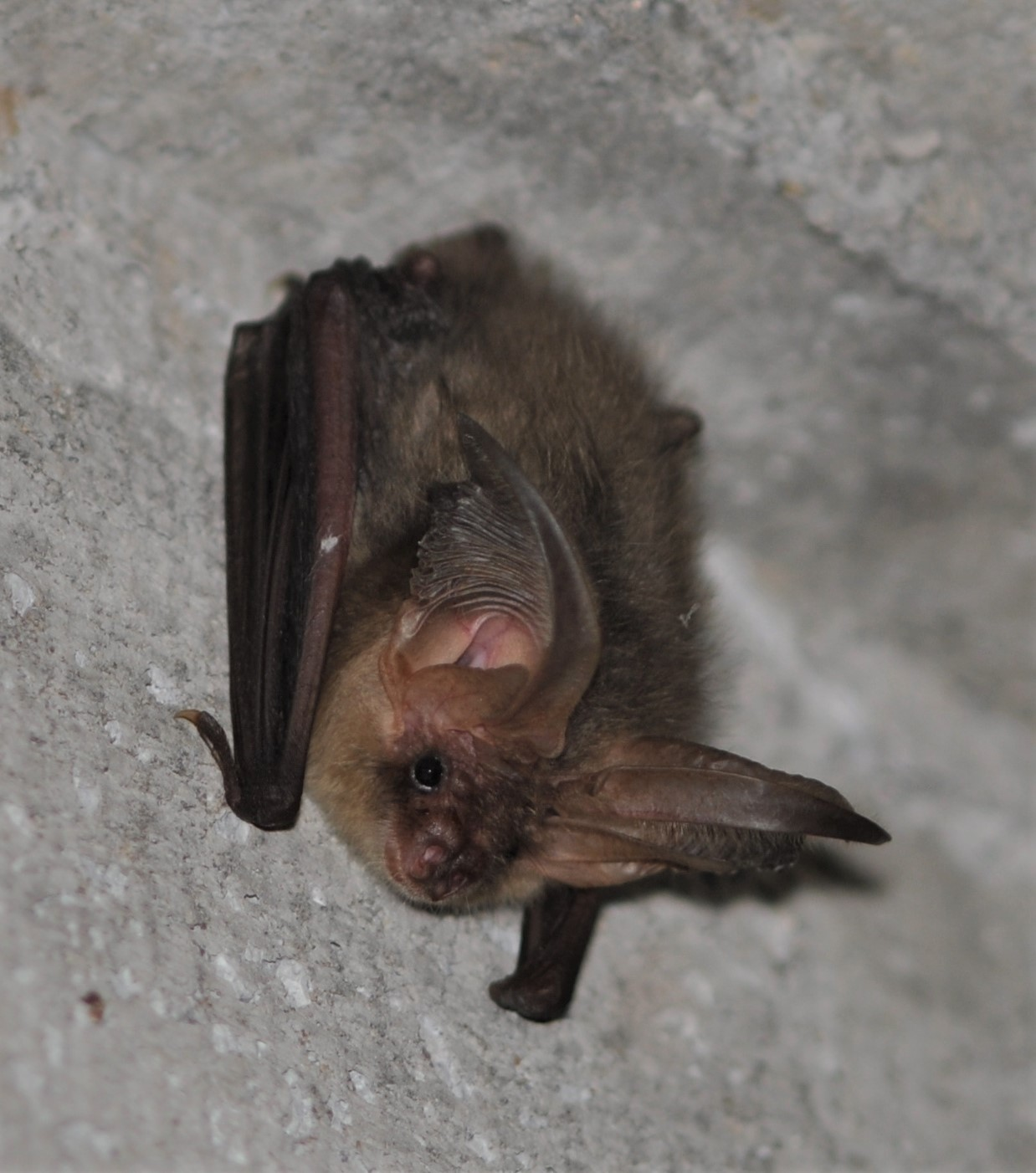
Brown long-eared bat

The bats' most distinguishing feature is that their forelimbs are developed as wings, making them the only mammals capable of flight. Bat species account for about 20% of all mammals.

- Family: Vespertilionidae
  - Subfamily: Myotinae
    - Genus: Myotis
      - Bechstein's bat, M. bechsteini NT
      - Lesser mouse-eared bat, M. blythii LC
      - Brandt's bat, M. brandti LC
      - Long-fingered bat, M. capaccinii VU
      - Cryptic myotis, M. crypticus NT
      - Pond bat, M. dasycneme NT
      - Daubenton's bat, M. daubentonii LC
      - Geoffroy's bat, M. emarginatus LC
      - Escalera's bat, M. escalerai NT
      - Greater mouse-eared bat, M. myotis LC
      - Whiskered bat, M. mystacinus LC
      - Natterer's bat, M. nattereri LC
  - Subfamily: Vespertilioninae
    - Genus: Barbastella
      - Western barbastelle, B. barbastellus NT
    - Genus: Eptesicus
      - Northern bat, E. nilssoni LC
      - Serotine bat, E. serotinus LC
    - Genus: Hypsugo
      - Savi's pipistrelle, H. savii LC
    - Genus: Nyctalus
      - Greater noctule bat, N. lasiopterus EN
      - Lesser noctule, N. leisleri LC
      - Common noctule, N. noctula LC
    - Genus: Pipistrellus
      - Kuhl's pipistrelle, P. kuhlii LC
      - Nathusius' pipistrelle, P. nathusii LC
      - Common pipistrelle, P. pipistrellus LC
    - Genus: Plecotus
      - Brown long-eared bat, P. auritus LC
      - Grey long-eared bat, P. austriacus NT
    - Genus: Vespertilio
      - Parti-coloured bat, V. murinus LC
  - Subfamily: Miniopterinae
    - Genus: Miniopterus
      - Common bent-wing bat, M. schreibersii VU
- Family: Molossidae
  - Genus: Tadarida
    - European free-tailed bat, T. teniotis LC
- Family: Rhinolophidae
  - Subfamily: Rhinolophinae
    - Genus: Rhinolophus
      - Mediterranean horseshoe bat, R. euryale NT
      - Greater horseshoe bat, R. ferrumequinum LC
      - Lesser horseshoe bat, R. hipposideros LC
      - Mehely's horseshoe bat, R. mehelyi VU

== Order: Cetacea (whales) ==
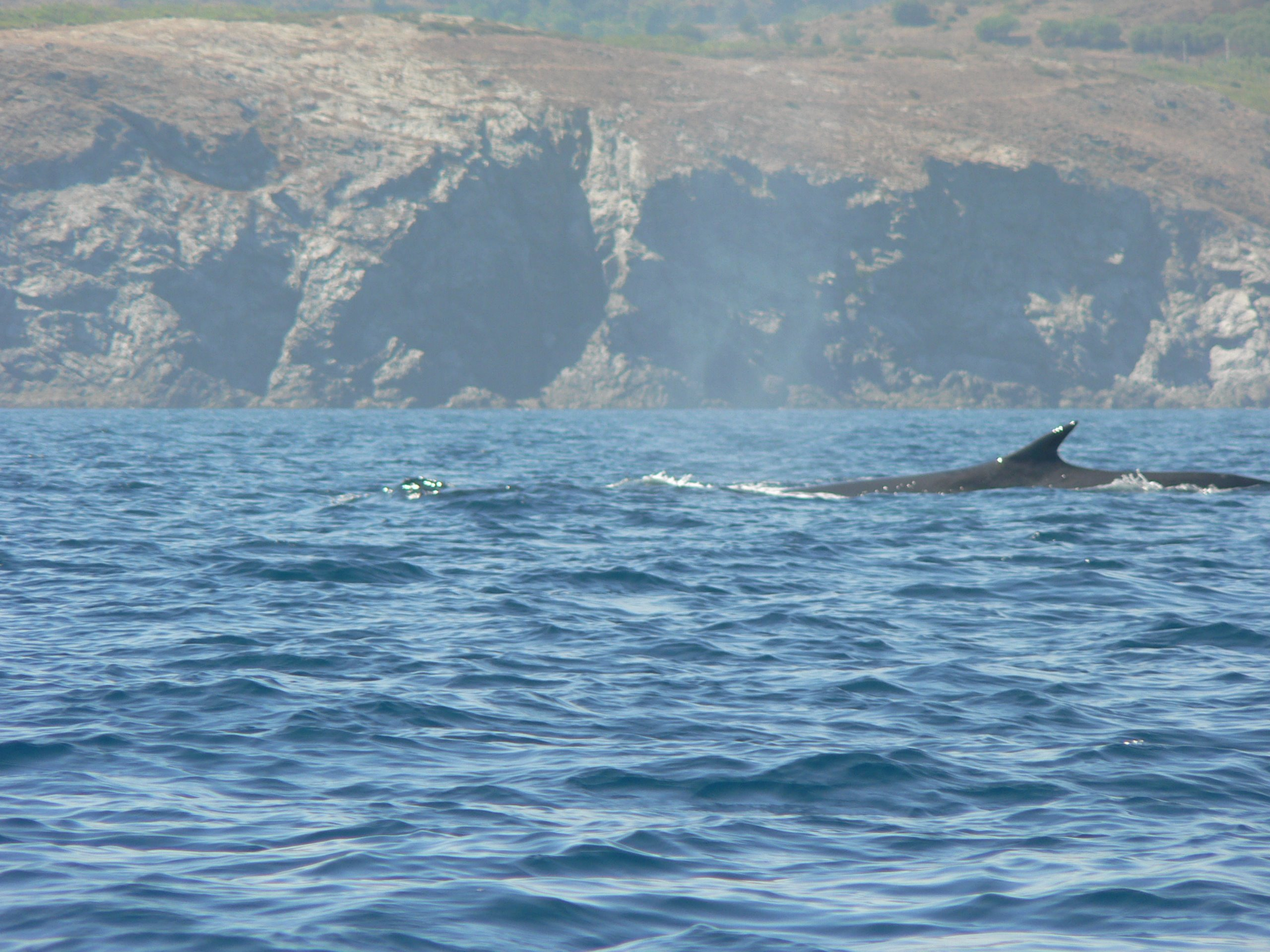
Fin whale near Port-Vendres

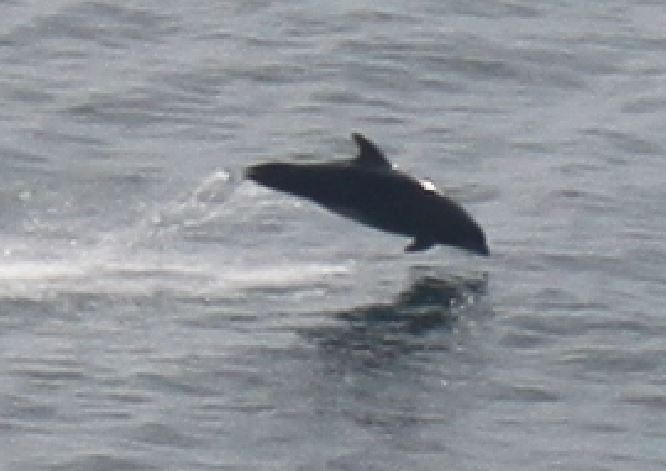
A dolphin leaping off Ille-et-Vilaine

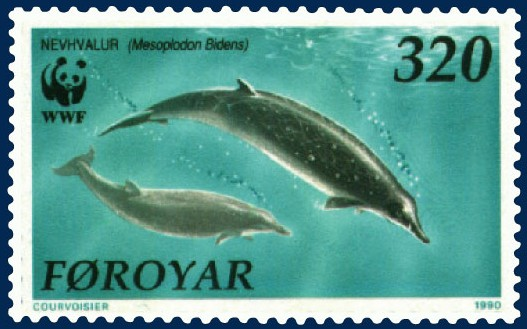
Sowerby's beaked whales

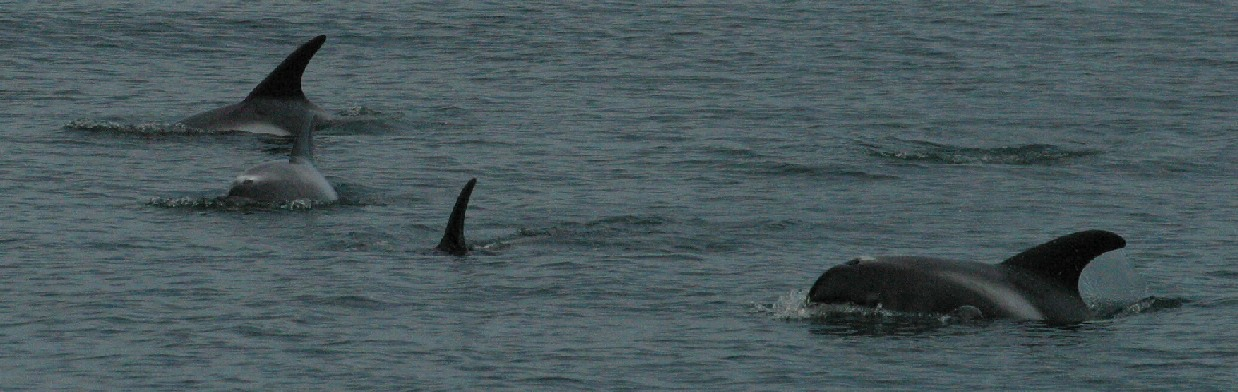
White-beaked dolphins

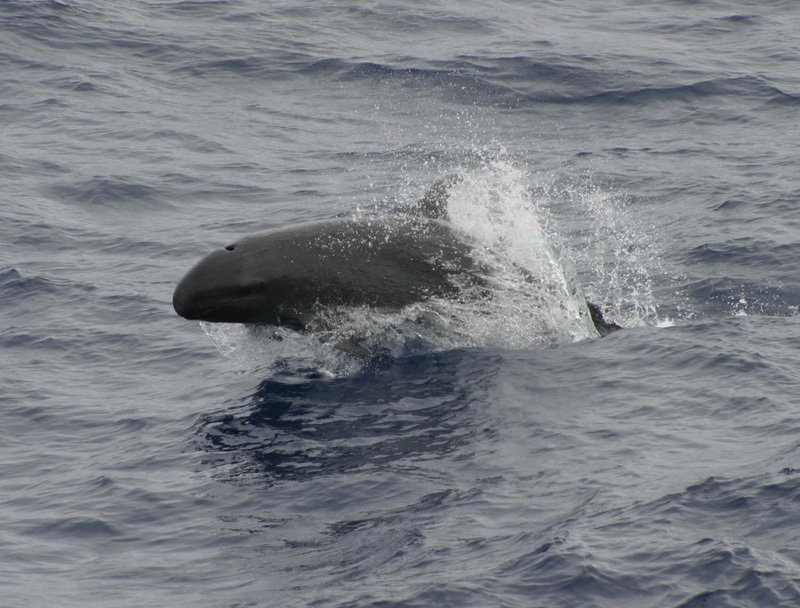
False killer whale

The order Cetacea includes whales, dolphins and porpoises. They are the mammals most fully adapted to aquatic life with a spindle-shaped nearly hairless body, protected by a thick layer of blubber, and forelimbs and tail modified to provide propulsion underwater.

- Suborder: Mysticeti
  - Family: Balaenidae (right whales)
    - Genus: Balaena
      - Bowhead whale, Balaena mysticetus LC vagrant
    - Genus: Eubalaena
      - North Atlantic right whale, Eubalaena glacialis CR or functionally extinct in European waters
  - Family: Balaenopteridae (rorquals)
    - Subfamily: Megapterinae
      - Genus: Megaptera
        - Humpback whale, Megaptera novaeangliae LC
    - Subfamily: Balaenopterinae
      - Genus: Balaenoptera
        - Fin whale, Balaenoptera physalus VU
        - Minke whale, Balaenoptera acutorostrata LC
- Suborder: Odontoceti
  - Family: Kogiidae
    - Genus: Kogia
      - Pygmy sperm whale, Kogia breviceps LC
  - Family: Ziphidae (beaked whales)
    - Genus: Ziphius
      - Cuvier's beaked whale, Ziphius cavirostris LC
    - Subfamily: Hyperoodontidae
      - Genus: Hyperoodon
        - Northern bottlenose whale, Hyperoodon ampullatus NT
      - Genus: Mesoplodon
        - Sowerby's beaked whale, Mesoplodon bidens LC
        - True's beaked whale, Mesoplodon mirus LC
  - Family: Phocoenidae (porpoises)
    - Genus: Phocoena
      - Harbour porpoise, Phocoena phocoena LC
  - Family: Delphinidae (marine dolphins)
    - Genus: Lagenorhynchus
      - White-beaked dolphin, Lagenorhynchus albirostris LC
    - Genus: Leucopleurus
      - Atlantic white-sided dolphin, Leucopleurus acutus LC
    - Genus: Steno
      - Rough-toothed dolphin, Steno bredanensis LC
    - Genus: Tursiops
      - Bottlenose dolphin, Tursiops truncatus LC
    - Genus: Stenella
      - Striped dolphin, Stenella coeruleoalba LC
    - Genus: Delphinus
      - Short-beaked common dolphin, Delphinus delphis LC
    - Genus: Grampus
      - Risso's dolphin, Grampus griseus LC
    - Genus: Feresa
      - Pygmy killer whale, Feresa attenuata LC
    - Genus: Pseudorca
      - False killer whale, Pseudorca crassidens NT
    - Genus: Globicephala
      - Pilot whale, Globicephala melas LC
    - Genus: Orcinus
      - Orca, Orcinus orca DD
  - Superfamily: Platanistoidea
    - Family: Monodontidae
      - Genus: Delphinapterus
        - Beluga, Delphinapterus leucas LC

== Order: Carnivora (carnivorans) ==
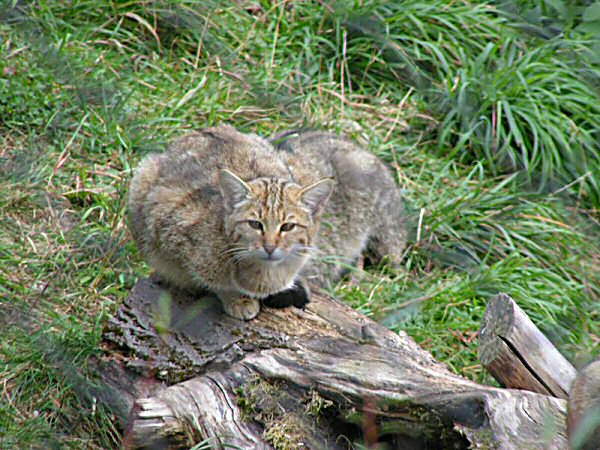
European wildcat

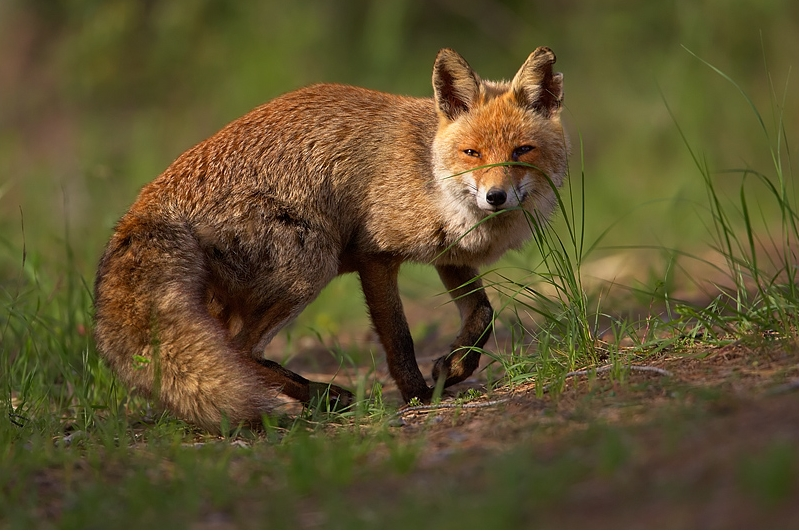
Red fox

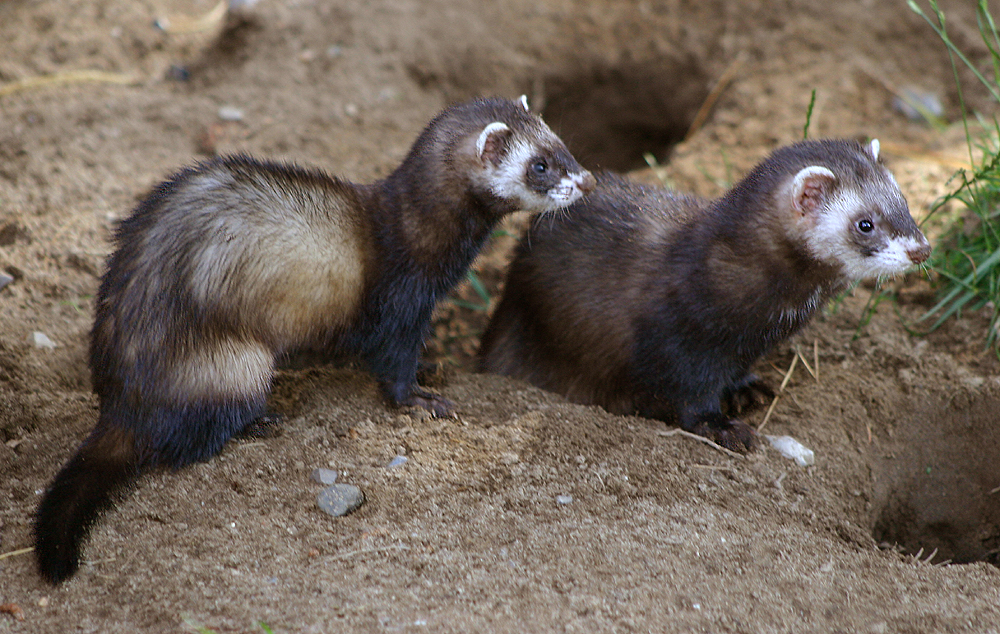
European polecats

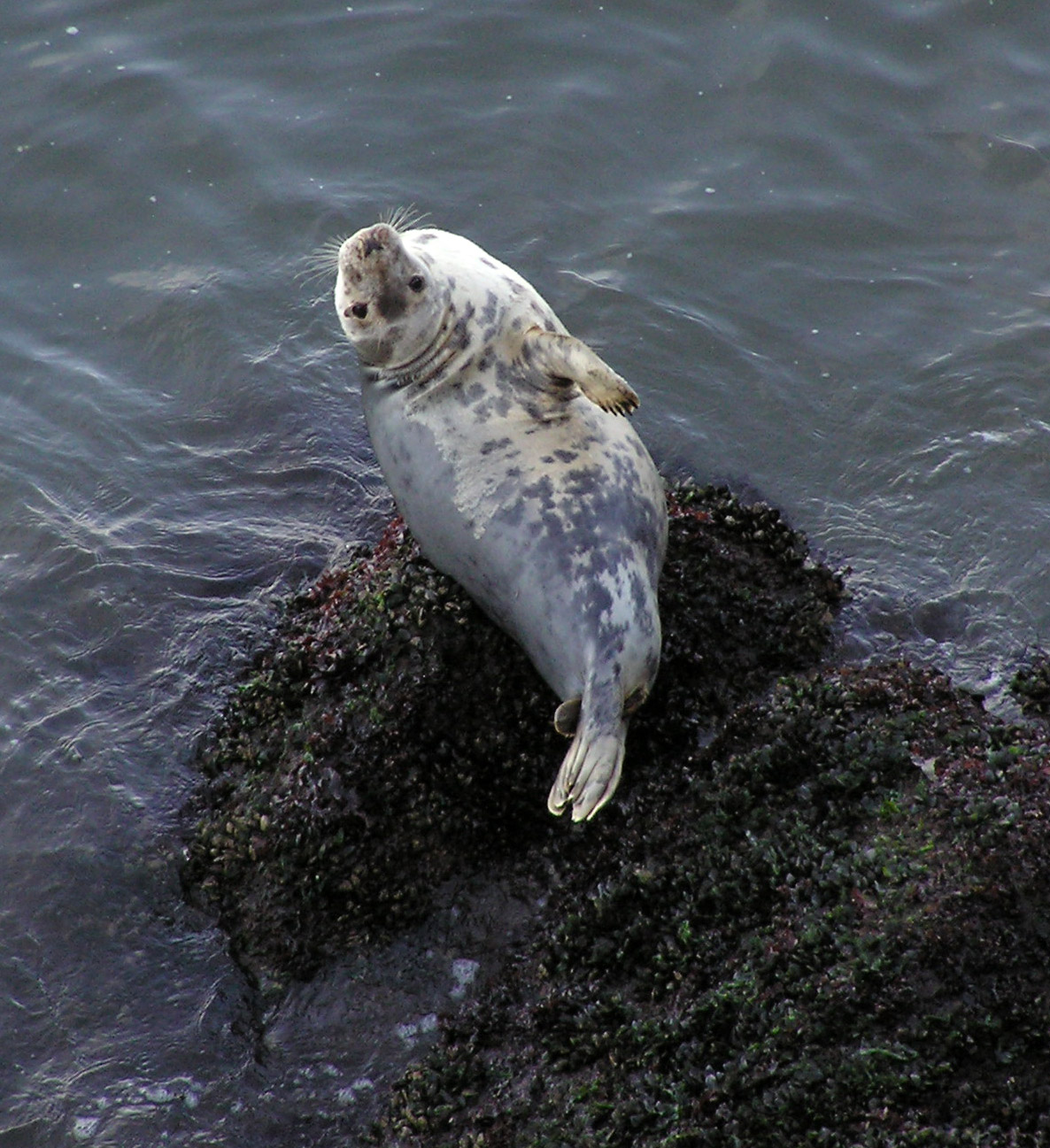
Grey seal

There are over 260 species of carnivorans, the majority of which feed primarily on meat. They have a characteristic skull shape and dentition.

- Suborder: Feliformia
  - Family: Felidae (cats)
    - Subfamily: Felinae
      - Genus: Felis
        - European wildcat, F. silvestris LC
      - Genus: Lynx
        - Eurasian lynx, L. lynx LC
        - Iberian lynx, L. pardinus VU extirpated
  - Family: Viverridae
    - Subfamily: Viverrinae
      - Genus: Genetta
        - Common genet, G. genetta LC introduced
- Suborder: Caniformia
  - Family: Canidae (dogs, foxes)
    - Genus: Canis
      - Golden jackal, C. aureus LC vagrant
      - Gray wolf, C. lupus LC LC
        - Italian wolf, C. l. italicus VU
        - Eurasian wolf, C. l. lupus LC
    - Genus: Nyctereutes
      - Raccoon dog, N. procyonoides LC introduced
    - Genus: Vulpes
      - Red fox, V. vulpes LC
  - Family: Ursidae (bears)
    - Genus: Ursus
      - Brown bear, U. arctos LC
        - Eurasian brown bear, U. a. arctos
  - Family: Mustelidae (mustelids)
    - Genus: Lutra
      - European otter, L. lutra NT
    - Genus: Martes
      - Beech marten, M. foina LC
      - European pine marten, M. martes LC
    - Genus: Meles
      - European badger, M. meles LC
    - Genus: Mustela
      - Stoat, M. erminea LC
      - European mink, M. lutreola CR
      - Least weasel, M. nivalis LC
      - European polecat, M. putorius LC
    - Genus: Neogale
      - American mink, N. vison LC introduced
  - Family: Phocidae (earless seals)
    - Genus: Erignathus
      - Bearded seal, E. barbatus NT
    - Genus: Halichoerus
      - Grey seal, H. grypus LC
    - Genus: Monachus
      - Mediterranean monk seal, M. monachus VU extirpated
    - Genus: Phoca
      - Common seal, P. vitulina LC

== Order: Artiodactyla (even-toed ungulates) ==
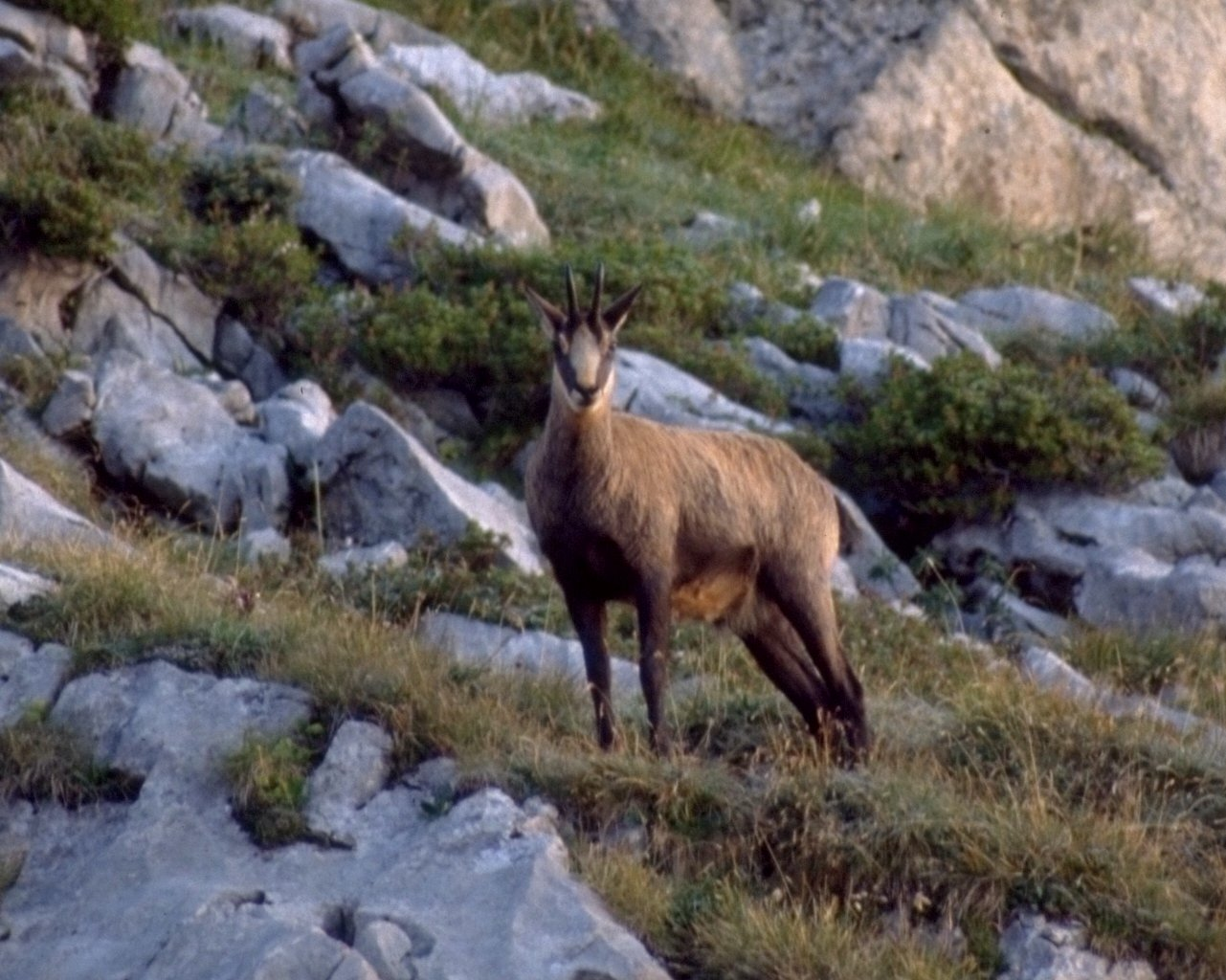
Iberian chamois

The even-toed ungulates are ungulates whose weight is borne about equally by the third and fourth toes, rather than mostly or entirely by the third as in perissodactyls. There are about 220 artiodactyl species, including many that are of great economic importance to humans.

- Family: Cervidae (deer)
  - Subfamily: Cervinae
    - Genus: Cervus
      - Red deer, C. elaphus LC
    - Genus: Dama
      - European fallow deer, D. dama LC introduced
  - Subfamily: Capreolinae
    - Genus: Alces
      - Eurasian elk, A. alces LC extirpated
    - Genus: Capreolus
      - Roe deer, C. capreolus LC
- Family: Bovidae (cattle, antelope, sheep, goats)
  - Subfamily: Bovidae
    - Genus: Bison
      - European bison, B. bonasus NT reintroduced
  - Subfamily: Caprinae
    - Genus: Capra
      - Alpine ibex, C. ibex LC reintroduced
      - Iberian ibex, C. pyrenaica LC reintroduced
        - Pyrenean ibex, C. p. pyrenaica EX
        - Western Spanish ibex, C. p. victoriae introduced
    - Genus: Rupicapra
      - Pyrenean chamois, R. pyrenaica LC
      - Chamois, R. rupicapra LC
- Family: Suidae (pigs)
  - Subfamily: Suinae
    - Genus: Sus
      - Wild boar, S. scrofa LC

== See also ==
- Wildlife of Metropolitan France
- List of chordate orders
- Lists of mammals by region
- Mammal classification
- List of mammals of Guadeloupe
- List of mammals of Martinique
- List of mammals of French Guiana
- List of mammals of French Polynesia
- List of mammals of Réunion
- List of mammals of Mayotte
