= Eaton Chalk Pit =

UK Site of Special Scientific Interest

Coordinates: 52.610°N 1.261°E

- Site of Special Scientific Interest
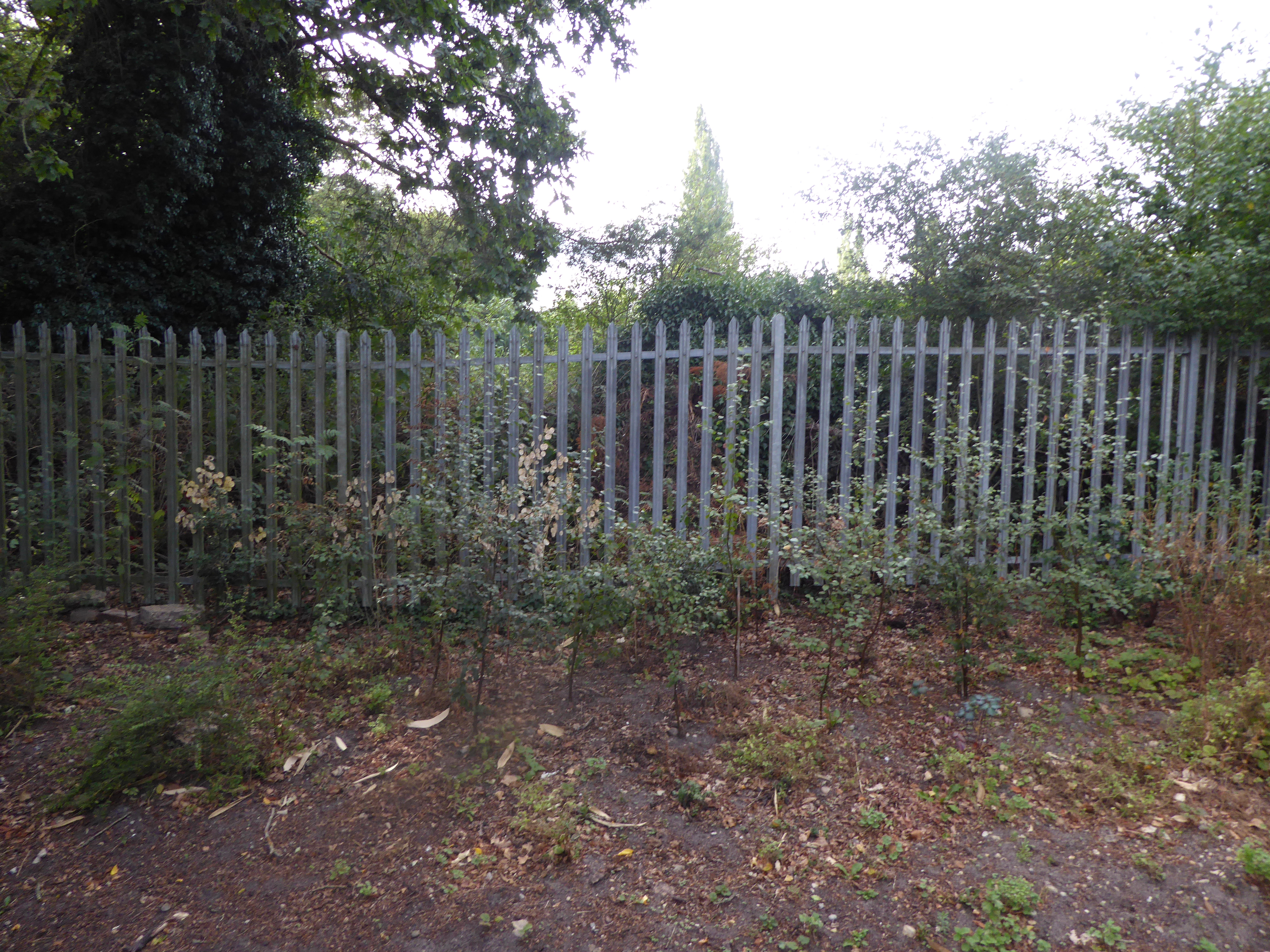
- Eaton Chalk Pit is in an area which is closed to the public.
- Location of Eaton Chalk Pit.
- Area of search: Norfolk
- Grid reference: TG 209 064
- Interest: Biological
- Area: 0.16 hectares (0.40 acres)
- Notification date: 1986
- Location map: Magic Map

Eaton Chalk Pit is a 0.16-hectare (0.40-acre) biological Site of Special Scientific Interest on the southern outskirts of Norwich in Norfolk, England.

These former chalk mines are used by hibernating bats and the site has been monitored over a long period for research into bat ecology. Up to 40 bats use the mines and the main species are Daubenton's, Natterer's and brown long-eared bats.

There is no public access to the site.
