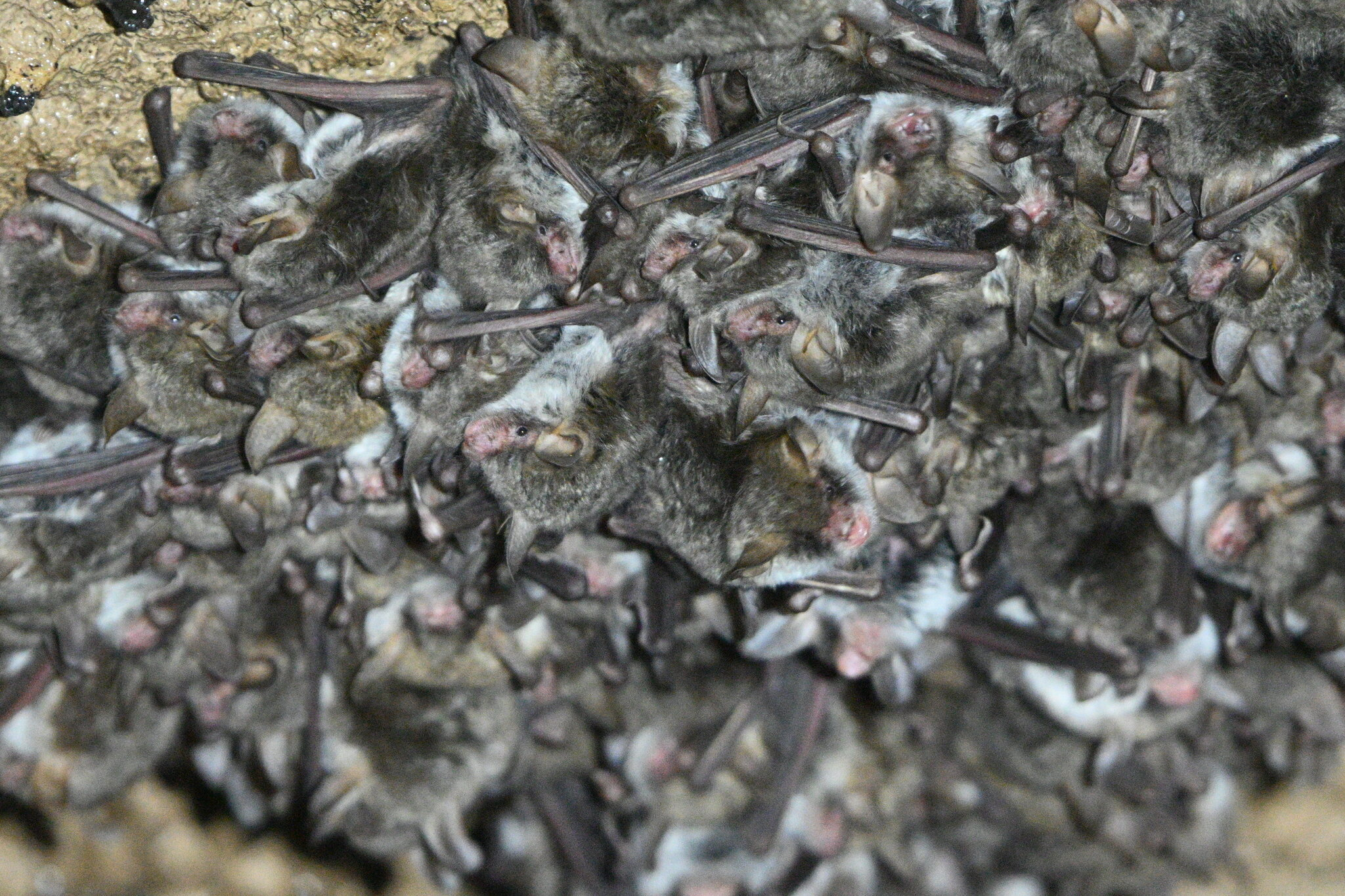
- A photograph showing the live bats

Conservation status
- Near Threatened (IUCN 3.1)

Scientific classification
- Kingdom: Animalia
- Phylum: Chordata
- Class: Mammalia
- Order: Chiroptera
- Family: Vespertilionidae
- Genus: Myotis
- Species: M. escalerai

Binomial name
- Myotis escalerai Cabrera, 1904

Synonyms
- Myotis escalerae (misspelling)

= Escalera's bat =

- A drawing by Ángel Cabrera, showing a ventral view of the entire animal, with one wing folded and the other spread; a lateral view of the head; and a view of the inner side of the ear

European bat in the genus Myotis

Escalera's bat (Myotis escalerai) is a European bat in the genus Myotis, found in Spain (including the Balearic Islands), Portugal, and far southern France.

Although the species was first named in 1904, it was included in Natterer's bat (Myotis nattereri) until molecular studies, first published in 2006, demonstrated that the two are distinct species. M. escalerai is most closely related to an unnamed species from Morocco. Unlike M. nattereri, which lives in small groups in tree holes, M. escalerai forms large colonies in caves. Females start to aggregate in late spring in maternity colonies, and their young are born in summer. The species spends each winter in hibernation colonies, usually in caves or basements.

M. escalerai is a medium-sized, mostly gray bat, with lighter underparts. It has a pointed muzzle, a pink face, and long ears. The wings are broad and the species is an agile flyer. Wingspan is 245 to 300 mm (9.6 to 11.8 in) and body mass is 5 to 9.5 g (0.18 to 0.34 oz). Though very similar to M. nattereri, it differs from that species in some features of the tail membrane. The conservation status of M. escalerai is assessed as "near threatened" or "data deficient" in various parts of its range.

== Taxonomy ==
Myotis escaleraii was named by Angel Cabrera in 1904, on the basis of four specimens from two localities in eastern Spain. He named the new species after the Spanish entomologist Manuel Martínez de la Escalera, who collected two specimens of the species in Bellver, Catalonia. Cabrera did not designate either of the two localities (Bellver and Foios, Valencia) as the type locality, and later authors have listed both. Currently, Foios, which was listed first by Cabrera, is accepted as the type locality. Cabrera commented that M. escalerai was close to Natterer's bat (Myotis nattereri), and in 1912, Gerrit S. Miller listed escalerai as a synonym of that species. He argued that one of the features Cabrera had listed as distinguishing the two was an artefact of the preservation of the specimens of M. escalerai in alcohol. Miller's classification was followed for almost a century, and indeed, Cabrera himself accepted in 1914 that M. escalerai was not a valid species.

- - - Myotis nattereri
    - Myotis crypticus and Myotis sp. C (see text)
  - Myotis schaubi
  - - Myotis escalerai
    - Myotis zenatius

Relationships in the Myotis nattereri complex based on nuclear and mitochondrial DNA sequences

However, a 2006 study by Carlos Ibáñez and colleagues found that M. nattereri in fact included several cryptic species with highly distinguished DNA sequences characteristics, even though morphological differences were small or nonexistent. One, which they recorded in the southern Iberian Peninsula, was identified as M. escalerai. Populations in the mountains of northern Spain represent another species (now known to be Myotis crypticus), which is now also known from the Alps. A 2009 study using data from the mitochondrial genes cytochrome b and ND1 found that M. escalerai is most closely related to an unnamed species from Morocco previously included in M. nattereri (now known to be Myotis zenatius), and more distantly to other members of the Myotis nattereri group. M. escalerai and M. zenatius are estimated to have diverged about 2 million years ago. Later in 2009, M. escalerai was also recorded for the first time from France. One 2011 study found a fifth putative species in the complex ("Myotis sp. C"), occurring in the Italian peninsula and most closely related to M. crypticus, but another study published in the same year included these populations in M. crypticus. The latter study, by I. Salicini and colleagues, used sequences from six nuclear genes to confirm the distinctiveness of M. escalerai and its close relationship with M. zenatius.

== Description ==
A medium-sized gray bat, Myotis escalerai is similar to Myotis nattereri. The fur is long and soft; with a brown tone on the back, and the brighter underparts approaching white. The feet are dark gray. Much of the face is pink, and the muzzle is pointed, with long hairs on the upper lip resembling a moustache. The long ears are brown to gray. The tragus, a projection on the inner side of the outer ear, is long and reaches to the middle of the ear and colored gray to yellow, becoming darker from the base towards the tip. According to several authors, it differs from M. nattereri in showing a distinct fringe of hairs on the tail membrane, but bat specialist A.M. Hutson writes that this feature does not distinguish the two species. In addition, the presence of an S-shaped spur on the uropatagium (membrane between the hind legs), which approaches the middle of the membrane, is a distinctive feature of this species. With its broad wings, low flight, and rapid wingbeats, the species is capable of precise, agile flight.

The head body length is 42 to 50 mm (1.7 to 2.0 in), tail length is 38 to 47 mm (1.5 to 1.9 in), forearm length is 35 to 43 mm (1.4 to 1.7 in), ear length is 14 to 18 mm (0.55 to 0.71 in), wingspan is 245 to 300 mm (9.6 to 11.8 in), and body mass is 5 to 9.5 g (0.18 to 0.34 oz).

== Distribution and ecology ==
The range of Myotis escalerai remains poorly constrained and may turn out to be larger than currently known. M. escalerai is widespread in Spain and Portugal. For example, it occurs widely, though localized, in Aragón, where Myotis sp. A (the only other species in the M. nattereri complex to occur there) is known from a single locality only. Similarly, in Catalonia, M. escalerai is widespread and occurs from sea level up to an altitude of 1,500 m (4,900 ft). The species also occurs on the Balearic Islands of Mallorca, Menorca, and Ibiza. The sole French record is from a cave in Valmanya, Pyrénées-Orientales.

Relatively little is known of the biology of M. escalerai. Females begin to form reproductive colonies in April and May, either small ones or larger aggregations that may also contain males. However, most males remain solitary in this period, although some also form colonies. The single young is born in June or July and becomes independent after some six weeks. Mating usually takes place in fall, but sometimes in winter. The formation of large reproductive colonies in caves, which may consist of several hundreds of individuals, distinguishes M. escalerai from M. nattereri as well as M. sp. A, which roost in smaller groups in tree holes. In Aragón, colonies contain 50 to 880 individuals, and Catalan colonies are known to contain over a hundred bats. Reproductive colonies may be formed in a variety of structures, including caves, mines, tree holes, and human-made structures such as bridges and houses. However, hibernation colonies need constant temperatures between 0 and 5 °C (32 and 41 °F), and are usually located in caves or basements. M. escalerai is considered a sedentary species, and does not usually migrate over long distances, although it does move between reproduction and hibernation colonies. Rabies has been identified in a Spanish specimen of M. escalerai.

== Conservation status ==
The IUCN Red List classifies Myotis escalerai as "near threatened". M. nattereri and M. escalerai are also listed separately on the Annex to the Agreement on the Conservation of Populations of European Bats. Portugal lists M. escalerai as "vulnerable", though noting that populations may be increasing. Because of its restriction to caves, it is considered vulnerable in Aragón. In Catalonia, the species appears tolerant of different habitats and of human disturbance, but it is listed as "data deficient". In France, where the species was only discovered in 2009, it is also listed as "data deficient".

== Literature cited ==
- Alcalde, J. T.; Trujillo, D.; Artázcoz, A.; Agirre-Mendi, P. T. (2008-06-30). "Distribución y estado de conservación de los quirópteros en Aragón". Graellsia (in Spanish). 64 (1): 3–16. doi:10.3989/graellsia.2008.v64.i1.51. ISSN 1989-953X.
- Amengual, Blanca; López-Roig, Marc; Mas, Oliver; González, J.; Serra-Cobo, J. (2007-01-01). "Anàlisi d'ADN mitocondrial de cinc espècies de quiròpters de les Illes Balears" [Mitochondrial DNA analysis of five species of bats from the Balearic Islands]. Bolleti de la Societat d'Historia Natural de les Balears (in Catalan). 50. ISSN 0212-260X.
- Benda, P.; Andreas, M.; Kock, D.; Lučan, R. K.; Weinfurtová, D. (2006-01-01). "Bats (Mammalia: Chiroptera) of the Eastern Mediterranean. Part 4. Bat fauna of Syria: distribution, systematics, ecology". ResearchGate. pp. 1–329.
- Cabrera, A. (1904). Ensayo monográfico sobre los quirópteros de España. Memorias de la Real Sociedad Española de Historia Natural (in Spanish). pp. 249–286.
- Evin, Allowen; Lecoq, Vincent; Durand, Marie-Odile; Tillon, Laurent; Pons, Jean-Marc (2009-01-01). "A new species for the French bat list: Myotis escalerai (Chiroptera: Vespertilionidae)". Mammalia. 73 (2). doi:10.1515/MAMM.2009.030. ISSN 1864-1547.
- Flaquer, Carles; Puig, Xavier; Fábregas, Enric; Guixé, David; Torre, Ignasi; Ràfols, Ruth G.; Páramo, Ferrán; Subirachs, Jordi Camprodon; Cumplido, Josep Mª; Jarillo, Ramón Ruíz; Baucells, Adrià L.; Freixas, Lidia; Arrizabalaga, Antoni (2010). "Revisión y aportación de datos sobre quirópteros de Catalunya: propuesta de lista roja" (PDF). Galemys: Boletín informativo de la Sociedad Española para la conservación y estudio de los mamíferos (in Spanish). 22 (1). Sociedad Española para la Conservación y Estudio de los Mamíferos: 29–61. doi:10.7325/Galemys.2010.1.A2. ISSN 1137-8700.
- García-Mudarra, Juan L.; Ibáñez, Carlos; Juste, Javier (2009-01-21). "The Straits of Gibraltar: barrier or bridge to Ibero-Moroccan bat diversity?: STRAITS OF GIBRALTAR: BARRIER OR BRIDGE?". Biological Journal of the Linnean Society. 96 (2): 434–450. doi:10.1111/j.1095-8312.2008.01128.x. hdl:10261/64168.
- Galimberti, A. (2011). DNA barcoding: a link between basic and applied science (PhD thesis). Università degli Studi di Milano-Bicocca. hdl:10281/18920.
- Gauthier, O. (2009). "Implementation of the Agreement on the Conservation of Populations of European Bats. National Report of France. 2006–2009" (PDF). Inf.EUROBATS.MoP6.19. Archived from the original (PDF) on 2011-07-26.
- Hutson, A.M. (2010). "Draft Resolution 6.2: Amendment of the Annex of the Agreement. Review of Species to be listed on the Annex to the Agreement" (PDF). Doc.EUROBATS.StC4-AC15.12.Rev.2. Archived from the original (PDF) on 2011-07-26.
- Ibáñez, C.; García-Mudarra, J.L.; Ruedi, M.; Stadelmann, B.; Juste, J. (2006). "The Iberian contribution to cryptic diversity in European bats". Acta Chiropterologica. 8 (2): 277–297. doi:10.3161/1733-5329(2006)8[277:TICTCD]2.0.CO;2. hdl:10261/48653.
- Miller, Gerrit S. (1912). Catalogue of the mammals of western Europe (Europe exclusive of Russia) in the collection of the British Museum. London: BMNH. doi:10.5962/bhl.title.8345.
- Ministério do Ambiente e do Ordenamento do Território (2010). "Agreement on the Conservation of Populations of European Bats. Report on implementation of the Agreement in Portugal – 2010" (PDF). Inf.EUROBATS.MoP6.35. Archived from the original (PDF) on 2011-07-26.
- Salicini, I.; Ibáñez, C.; Juste, J. (2011). "Multilocus phylogeny and species delimitation within the Natterer's bat species complex in the Western Palearctic". Molecular Phylogenetics and Evolution. 61 (3): 888–898. Bibcode:2011MolPE..61..888S. doi:10.1016/j.ympev.2011.08.010. hdl:10261/48022. PMID 21872668.
- López-Roig, M.; Cobo, J.S. (2008). Ratpenats: ciència i mite (in Catalan). Publicacions i Edicions de la Universitat de Barcelona. ISBN 978-84-475-3344-2.
- Serra-Cobo, J.; Bourhy, H.; López-Roig, M.; Sánchez, LP.; Abellán, C.; Borràs, M.; Amengual, B. (2012-03-12). "Rabia en quirópteros: Circulación de EBLV-1 (Lyssavirus de murciélagos europeos tipo 1) en murciélagos de España". Boletín Epidemiológico Semanal (in Spanish). 16 (15). ISSN 2173-9277.
- Simmons, N.B. (2005). "Order Chiroptera". In Wilson, D.E.; Reeder, D.M. (eds.). Mammal Species of the World: A Taxonomic and Geographic Reference (3rd ed.). Baltimore: The Johns Hopkins University Press. pp. 312–529. ISBN 978-0-8018-8221-0.
