= Schaub's myotis =

Conservation status
- Data Deficient (IUCN 3.1)

Scientific classification
- Kingdom: Animalia
- Phylum: Chordata
- Class: Mammalia
- Order: Chiroptera
- Family: Vespertilionidae
- Genus: Myotis
- Species: M. schaubi

Binomial name
- Myotis schaubi Kormos, 1934

Synonyms
- Myotis natteri araxenus (Dahl, 1947); Myotis kretzoii (Topál, 1981)

Species of bat

Schaub's myotis (Myotis schaubi) is a species of vesper bat. It is found in Armenia and Iran, and known from fossils from Hungary and Russia.

== Taxonomy ==
Schaub's myotis was described by Tivadar Kormos in 1934 based on a fossil found in Hungary. The fossil was dated to the Pliocene epoch. The subspecies Myotis natteri araxenus (Dahl, 1947) was later allocated to it, and the name Myotis kretzoii (Topál, 1981) was also synonymized. The eponym for the species name schaubi is Samuel Schaub (1882–1955), a Swiss paleontologist.

A 2020 study found that its sister taxon is Myotis tschuliensis.

== Description ==
Individuals have a total body length of 48–53 mm (1.9–2.1 in) and a forearm length of 41.3–44.1 mm (1.63–1.74 in). The tail is 48–49 mm (1.9–1.9 in) long.

== Range and habitat ==
Its temporal range is from the Pliocene to modern times. During the Pleistocene epoch, Schaub's myotis was distributed widely throughout central and eastern Europe. Fossils of this species have been found in Hungary and Russia. At present, its range includes Armenia and Iran, and it appears endemic to the Caucasus region.

During the day, it roosts in rock cracks, caves, and buildings. Its habitat preferences are unknown, but could include shrubland and forests.

== Conservation ==
It is a rarely encountered species, and thus little is known about it. It has been considered a data deficient species by the IUCN since 2008.
