= List of mammals of Guadeloupe =

This is a list of the mammal species recorded in Guadeloupe. Of the mammal species in Guadeloupe, four are endangered, two are vulnerable, and one is considered to be extinct.

The following tags are used to highlight each species' conservation status as assessed by the International Union for Conservation of Nature:

EX	Extinct	No reasonable doubt that the last individual has died.
EW	Extinct in the wild	Known only to survive in captivity or as a naturalized populations well outside its previous range.
CR	Critically endangered	The species is in imminent risk of extinction in the wild.
EN	Endangered	The species is facing an extremely high risk of extinction in the wild.
VU	Vulnerable	The species is facing a high risk of extinction in the wild.
NT	Near threatened	The species does not meet any of the criteria that would categorise it as risking extinction but it is likely to do so in the future.
LC	Least concern	There are no current identifiable risks to the species.
DD	Data deficient	There is inadequate information to make an assessment of the risks to this species.

== Order: Sirenia (manatees and dugongs) ==
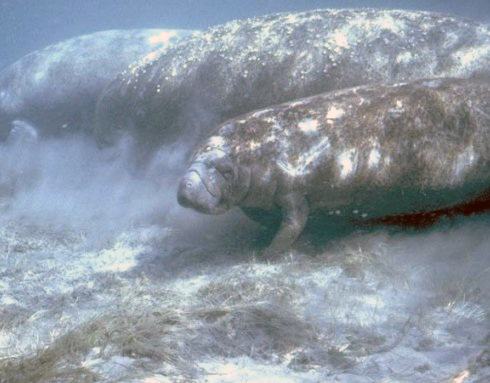
West Indian manatees

Sirenia is an order of fully aquatic, herbivorous mammals that inhabit rivers, estuaries, coastal marine waters, swamps, and marine wetlands. All four species are endangered.

- Family: Trichechidae
  - Genus: Trichechus
    - West Indian manatee, T. manatus VU extirpated

== Order: Chiroptera (bats) ==
The bats' most distinguishing feature is that their forelimbs are developed as wings, making them the only mammals capable of flight. Bat species account for about 20% of all mammals.

- Family: Noctilionidae
  - Genus: Noctilio
    - Greater bulldog bat, Noctilio leporinus LR/lc
- Family: Vespertilionidae
  - Subfamily: Myotinae
    - Genus: Myotis
      - Dominican myotis, Myotis dominicensis VU
  - Subfamily: Vespertilioninae
    - Genus: Eptesicus
      - Guadeloupe big brown bat, Eptesicus guadeloupensis EN
- Family: Molossidae
  - Genus: Tadarida
    - Mexican free-tailed bat, Tadarida brasiliensis LR/nt
- Family: Mormoopidae
  - Genus: Pteronotus
    - Naked-backed bat, Pteronotus davyi LR/lc
- Family: Phyllostomidae
  - Subfamily: Brachyphyllinae
    - Genus: Brachyphylla
      - Antillean fruit-eating bat, Brachyphylla cavernarum LR/lc
  - Subfamily: Glossophaginae
    - Genus: Monophyllus
      - Insular single leaf bat, Monophyllus plethodon LR/nt
  - Subfamily: Carolliinae
    - Genus: Carollia
      - Seba's short-tailed bat, Carollia perspicillata LR/lc
  - Subfamily: Stenodermatinae
    - Genus: Ardops
      - Tree bat, Ardops nichollsi LR/nt
    - Genus: Artibeus
      - Jamaican fruit bat, Artibeus jamaicensis LR/lc
    - Genus: Chiroderma
      - Guadeloupe big-eyed bat, Chiroderma improvisum EN
    - Genus: Sturnira
      - Thomas's yellow-shouldered bat, Sturnira thomasi EN
- Family: Natalidae
  - Genus: Natalus
    - Mexican funnel-eared bat, Natalus stramineus LR/lc

== Order: Cetacea (whales) ==
The order Cetacea includes whales, dolphins and porpoises. They are the mammals most fully adapted to aquatic life with a spindle-shaped nearly hairless body, protected by a thick layer of blubber, and forelimbs and tail modified to provide propulsion underwater.

- Suborder: Mysticeti
  - Family: Balaenopteridae (baleen whales)
    - Genus: Balaenoptera
      - Common minke whale, Balaenoptera acutorostrata
      - Sei whale, Balaenoptera borealis
      - Bryde's whale, Balaenoptera brydei
      - Blue whale, Balaenoptera musculus
    - Genus: Megaptera
      - Humpback whale, Megaptera novaeangliae
- Suborder: Odontoceti
  - Superfamily: Platanistoidea
    - Family: Delphinidae (marine dolphins)
      - Genus: Delphinus
        - Short-beaked common dolphin, Delphinus delphis DD
      - Genus: Feresa
        - Pygmy killer whale, Feresa attenuata DD
      - Genus: Globicephala
        - Short-finned pilot whale, Globicephala macrorhyncus DD
      - Genus: Lagenodelphis
        - Fraser's dolphin, Lagenodelphis hosei DD
      - Genus: Grampus
        - Risso's dolphin, Grampus griseus DD
      - Genus: Orcinus
        - Killer whale, Orcinus orca DD
      - Genus: Peponocephala
        - Melon-headed whale, Peponocephala electra DD
      - Genus: Pseudorca
        - False killer whale, Pseudorca crassidens DD
      - Genus: Stenella
        - Pantropical spotted dolphin, Stenella attenuata DD
        - Clymene dolphin, Stenella clymene DD
        - Striped dolphin, Stenella coeruleoalba DD
        - Atlantic spotted dolphin, Stenella frontalis DD
        - Spinner dolphin, Stenella longirostris DD
      - Genus: Steno
        - Rough-toothed dolphin, Steno bredanensis DD
      - Genus: Tursiops
        - Common bottlenose dolphin, Tursiops truncatus
    - Family: Physeteridae (sperm whales)
      - Genus: Physeter
        - Sperm whale, Physeter catodon DD
    - Family: Kogiidae (dwarf sperm whales)
      - Genus: Kogia
        - Pygmy sperm whale, Kogia breviceps DD
        - Dwarf sperm whale, Kogia sima DD
  - Superfamily Ziphioidea
    - Family: Ziphidae (beaked whales)
      - Genus: Mesoplodon
        - Gervais' beaked whale, Mesoplodon europaeus DD
      - Genus: Ziphius
        - Cuvier's beaked whale, Ziphius cavirostris DD

== Order: Carnivora (carnivorans) ==
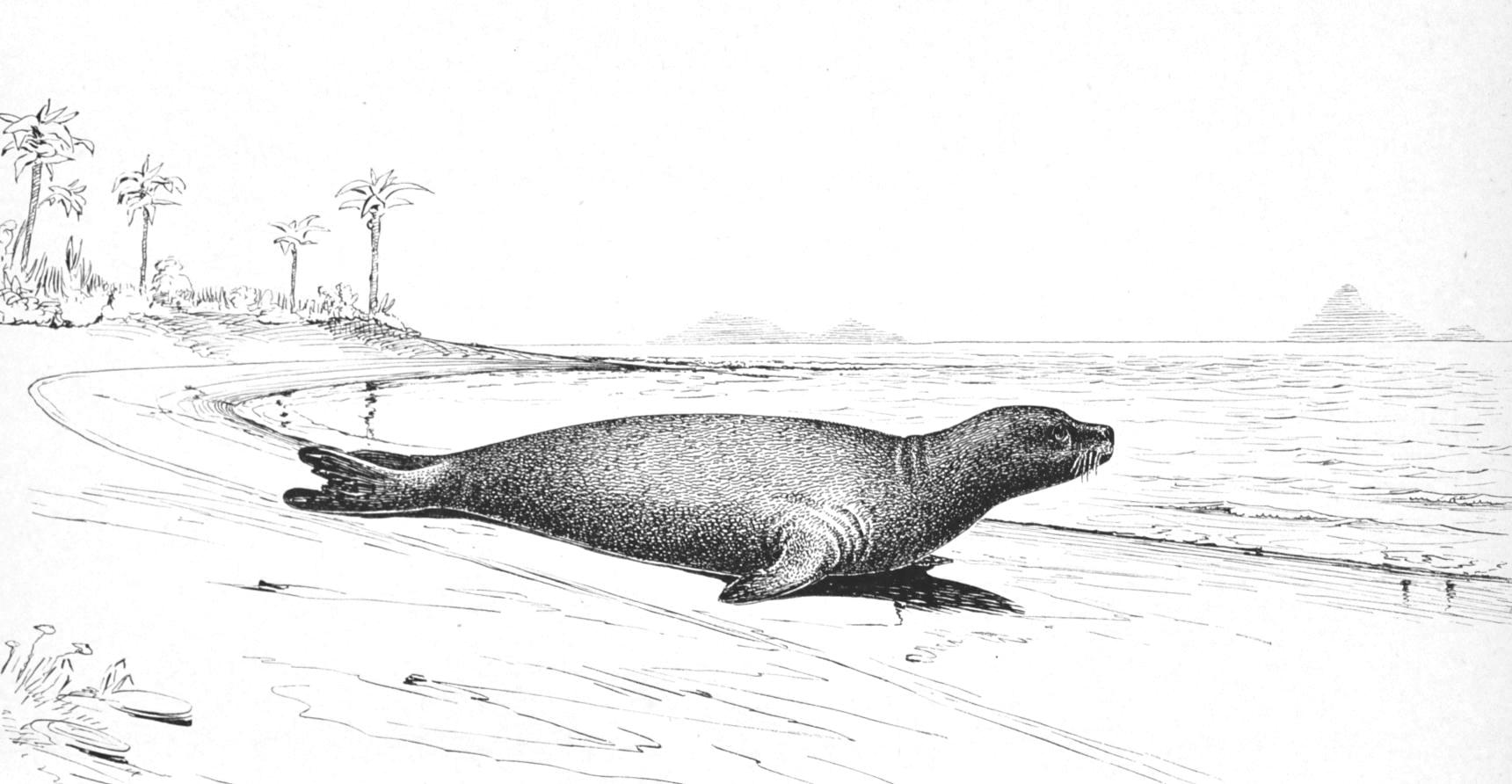
Caribbean monk seal

There are over 260 species of carnivores, the majority of which feed primarily on meat. They have a characteristic skull shape and dentition.

- Suborder: Caniformia
  - Family: Procyonidae (raccoons)
    - Genus: Procyon
      - Raccoon, P. lotor LC introduced
        - Guadeloupe raccoon, P. l. minor
- Suborder: Pinnipedia
  - Family: Phocidae (earless seals)
    - Genus: Neomonachus
      - Caribbean monk seal, Neomonachus tropicalis EX

== Order: Lagomorpha (rabbits and hares) ==
- Family Leporidae
  - Genus: Lepus
    - European hare, Lepus europaeus introduced

== See also ==
- List of chordate orders
- Lists of mammals by region
- List of prehistoric mammals
- Mammal classification
- List of mammals described in the 2000s
