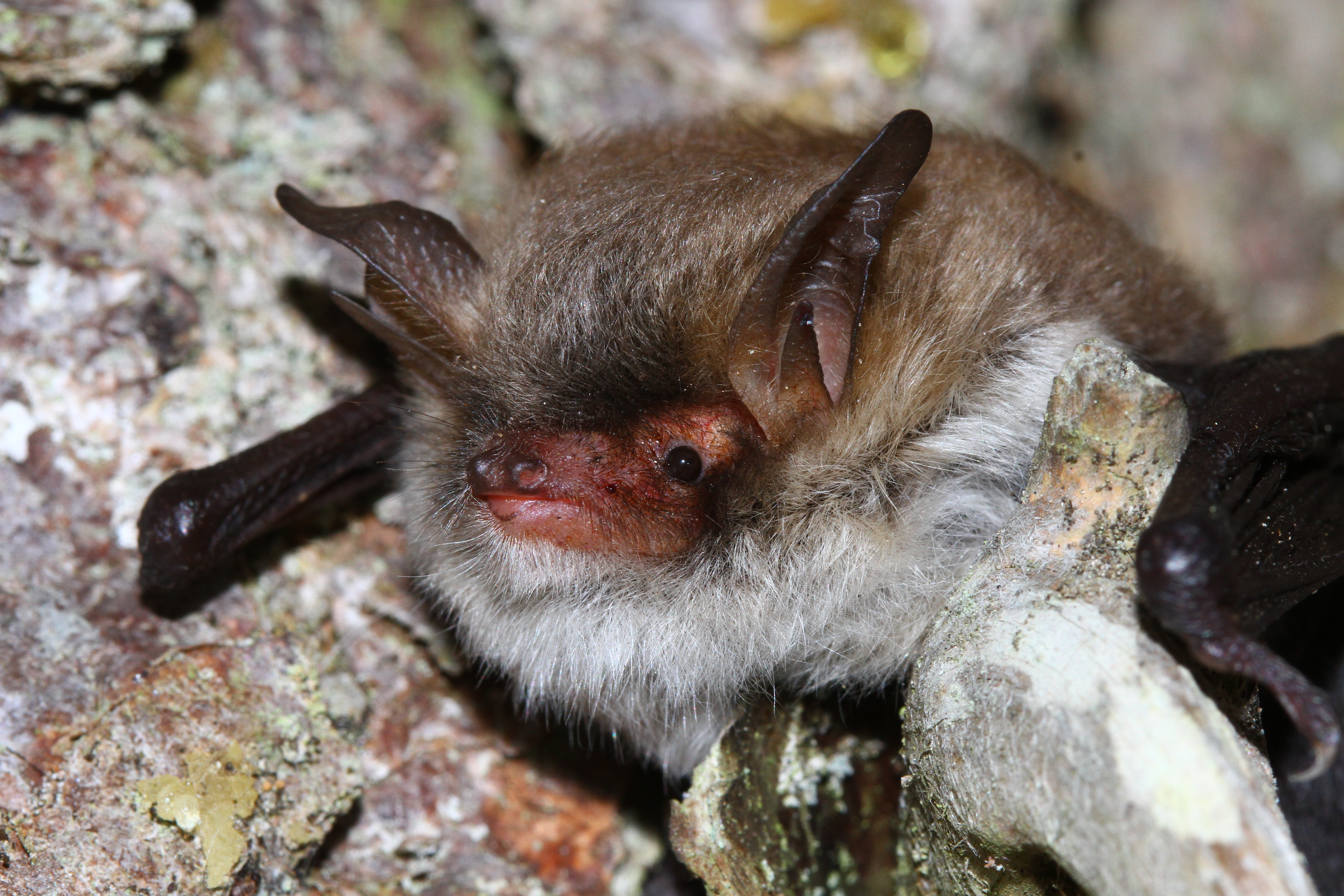

Conservation status
- Near Threatened (IUCN 3.1)

Scientific classification
- Kingdom: Animalia
- Phylum: Chordata
- Class: Mammalia
- Order: Chiroptera
- Family: Vespertilionidae
- Genus: Myotis
- Species: M. crypticus

Binomial name
- Myotis crypticus Juste, Ruedi, Puechmaille, Salicini & Ibáñez, 2019
- Cryptic myotis range

= Cryptic myotis =

Species of bat

The cryptic myotis (Myotis crypticus) is a European vespertilionid bat. It is a member of the Natterer's bat (M. nattereri) species complex, and is also the closest living relative of M. nattereri.

== Distribution and habitat ==
It is mostly distributed across European countries bordering the Mediterranean Sea, from Spain west to Austria, north to Switzerland, and south to most of the Italian Peninsula. Populations of similar bats in southern Italy and Sicily display significant genetic divergence from M. crypticus, and thus may represent a unique taxonomic entity that requires more study. It is found in a wide range of altitudes, from sea level to 1000 meters above. It feeds in forest and grassland habitats and roosts in tree hollows as well as man-made structures. In autumn, M. crypticus swarms with other Myotis in large numbers, and overwinters with them in underground sites such as crevices.

== Food ==
The cryptic murine is still poorly understood as it was discovered late. However, its resemblance to the Natterer's Murin means it probably hunts in closed environments. In some areas like western Switzerland, it feeds on spiders and caterpillars.
