= Agreement on the Conservation of Populations of European Bats =

International treaty

EUROBATS
Agreement on the Conservation of Populations of European Bats
- Type: Multilateral
- Context: Bat conservation
- Signed: 4 December 1991; 34 years ago
- Location: London, United Kingdom
- Effective: 16 January 1994
- Condition: Ratification by five range states
- Parties: List: Albania; Belgium; Bulgaria; Bosnia and Herzegovina; Croatia; Cyprus; Czech Republic; Denmark; Estonia; Finland; France; Georgia; Germany; Hungary; Ireland; Israel; Italy; Latvia; Lithuania; Luxembourg; Malta; Moldova; Monaco; Montenegro; Netherlands; North Macedonia; Norway; Poland; Portugal; Romania; San Marino; Serbia; Slovakia; Slovenia; Spain; Sweden; Switzerland; Ukraine; United Kingdom
- Depositary: Government of the United Kingdom
- Languages: English; French; German

Full text
- Agreement on the Conservation of Populations of European Bats at Wikisource

The Agreement on the Conservation of Populations of European Bats, or EUROBATS, is an international treaty that binds its States Parties on the conservation of bats in their territories. It was signed in 1991 under the auspices of the Convention on the Conservation of Migratory Species of Wild Animals (CMS), with the Agreement entering into force in 1994. In June 2026, the Agreement applied to 39 of 63 range states.

== History ==
The Agreement was concluded as "Agreement on the Conservation of Bats in Europe" in September 1991 during the Third Meeting of the Parties of the Convention on Migratory Species. It entered into force on 16 January 1994, after the required number of five states (Germany, The Netherlands, Norway, Sweden and UK) had ratified it.

In 2000, the Parties decided to change the Agreement's name into its current form "Agreement on the Conservation of Populations of European Bats". In 2001, the Agreement became part of the United Nations Environment Programme (UNEP).

== Aim of the agreement ==
The overall goal of the Agreement is to provide a framework for bat conservation for the member states and those that have not yet joined. According to the agreement text, member states prohibit the deliberate capture, keeping or killing of bats except for research purposes for which a special permit is required. Furthermore, the member states identify important sites for bat conservation, survey the status and trends of bat populations and study their migratory patterns. Based on the result of these monitoring activities the Agreement develops and reviews recommendations and guidelines that shall be implemented by the Parties on national levels.

== Bodies of the agreement ==
=== Meeting of the parties ===
The Meeting of the parties is the highest decision-making body of the Agreement and adopts Resolutions. Every Party has one vote. Non-Party range states as well as bat conservation organisations may be represented as observers at the meetings.

The Meeting of the Parties takes place at changing locations every four years.

=== Advisory committee ===
The advisory committee is the working body of the agreement. It evaluates data and discusses scientific issues concerning bat research and conservation to set priorities for the Agreement' future work. The committee deals with topics like bat migration, light pollution or the impact of wind turbines on bat populations. Furthermore, it drafts the Resolutions to be adopted at the Meetings of the Parties.

The Committee meets once a year.

=== Standing committee ===
The standing committee is the administrative body of the Agreement. It monitors the execution of the Secretariat's budget, oversees the implementation of policies by the Secretariat and discusses further administrative matters like staff issues. The committee was established by the 5th Meeting of the Parties in autumn 2006 to redesign the Advisory Committee to scientific issues.

The Committee shall meet once a year, if a meeting is needed, at the UN Campus in Bonn/Germany. The first Meeting took place in March 2007.

=== Secretariat ===
The Secretariat is the executive body of the Agreement. It coordinates and organises the activities of the Meeting of the Parties, the Advisory Committee and the Standing Committee and undertakes initiatives for implementing the aspired aims, attracting more member states and exchanging information. Furthermore, it coordinates international research and monitoring activities.

Another main task of the Secretariat is to raise public awareness. The “European Bat Night” goes back to an initiative of the EUROBATS Secretariat and is today an event in more than 30 European states.

The Secretariat was established by the 1st Meeting of the Parties in 1995 and started its work in Bonn/Germany in 1996. Since June 2006 it is accommodated at the UN Campus in the former parliamentary building of the Federal Republic of Germany.

== Agreement area ==
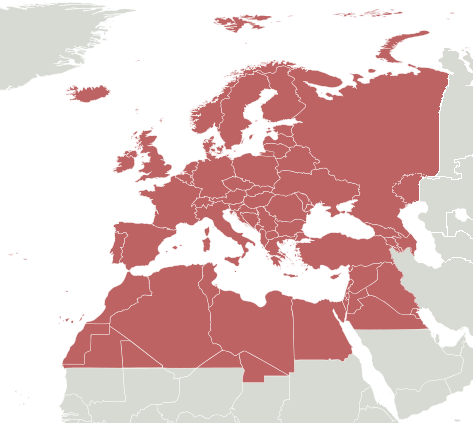
The area of the Agreement is mostly based in the Western Palaearctic region

When it was signed in 1991, the agreement defined the area of the agreement as "the continent of Europe." This ambiguity led to some confusion, and multiple resolutions were passed to try to clarify this matter. A resolution of the 2nd Session of the Meeting of Parties in 1998 defined the area as follows: the Western Palaearctic region, excluding North Africa, Iceland and many of Middle Eastern states in its definition. This definition was reaffirmed in 2006.

However, at the 6th Session of the Meeting of Parties in 2010, Resolution 6.3 defined the scope of the agreement as the Western Palaearctic region. More specifically, it stated that its boundaries were as follow:

- To the North, the Svalbard Archipelago
- To the East, longitude 50° E
- To the South, the countries of the Mediterranean Basin
- To the West, the Azores at 30° West

This new definition recognized that European bats were migrating to and from beyond the previously designated geographical scope of the Agreement as defined in 1998. This new definition included countries in the Middle East and North Africa, the islands owned by European states in the Mediterranean as well as some Central Asian states.

== Species ==
EUROBATS currently lists 51 species of bat that occur naturally in Europe that the Agreement pertains to. They are as follow:

- Emballonuridae
  - Taphozous nudiventris
- Molossidae
  - Tadarida teniotis
- Pteropodidae
  - Rousettus aegyptiacus
- Rhinolophidae
  - Rhinolophus blasii
  - Rhinolophus euryale
  - Rhinolophus ferrumequinum
  - Rhinolophus hipposideros
  - Rhinolophus mehelyi
- Vespertilionidae
  - Barbastella barbastellus
  - Barbastella caspica
  - Eptesicus anatolicus
  - Eptesicus isabellinus
  - Eptesicus nilssonii
  - Eptesicus ognevi
- Vespertilionidae (cont.)
  - Eptesicus serotinus
  - Hypsugo savii
  - Myotis alcathoe
  - Myotis bechsteinii
  - Myotis blythii
  - Myotis brandtii
  - Myotis capaccinii
  - Myotis dasycneme
  - Myotis daubentonii
  - Myotis davidii
  - Myotis emarginatus
  - Myotis escalerai
  - Myotis myotis
  - Myotis mystacinus
  - Myotis nattereri
  - Myotis punicus
  - Myotis schaubi
  - Nyctalus azoreum
- Vespertilionidae (cont.)
  - Nyctalus lasiopterus
  - Nyctalus leisleri
  - Nyctalus noctula
  - Otonycteris hemprichii
  - Pipistrellus hanaki
  - Pipistrellus kuhlii
  - Pipistrellus maderensis
  - Pipistrellus nathusii
  - Pipistrellus pipistrellus
  - Pipistrellus pygmaeus
  - Plecotus auritus
  - Plecotus austriacus
  - Plecotus kolombatovici
  - Plecotus macrobullaris
  - Plecotus sardus
  - Plecotus teneriffae
  - Vespertilio murinus
  - Miniopterus pallidus
  - Miniopterus schreibersii

== Pertaining states ==
=== States parties ===
The following are all the states that have ratified the Agreement, and are regarded as its member states:

Country	Date of signing	Date of deposit of instrument of ratification
Albania		22 June 2001
Belgium	4 December 1991	14 May 2003
Bosnia and Herzegovina		22 July 2021
Bulgaria		9 November 1999
Croatia		8 August 2000
Cyprus		13 November 2012
Czech Republic		24 February 1994
Denmark	4 December 1991	6 January 1994
Estonia		11 November 2004
Finland		20 September 1999
France	10 December 1993	7 July 1995
Georgia		25 July 2002
Germany	5 December 1991	18 October 1993
Hungary		22 June 1994
Ireland	21 June 1993	21 June 1995
Italy		20 October 2005
Israel		15 December 2014
Latvia		1 August 2003
Lithuania		28 November 2001
Luxembourg	4 December 1991	29 October 1993
Malta		2 March 2001
Moldova		2 February 2001
Monaco		23 July 1999
Montenegro		28 March 2011
Netherlands	4 December 1991	17 March 1992
North Macedonia		15 September 1999
Norway	3 February 1993	Not necessary
Poland		10 April 1996
Portugal	4 June 1993	10 January 1996
Romania		20 July 2000
San Marino		9 April 2009
Serbia		8 February 2019
Slovakia		9 July 1998
Slovenia		5 December 2003
Spain		13 June 2024
Sweden	4 March 1992	Not necessary
Switzerland		27 July 2013
Ukraine		30 September 1999
United Kingdom	4 December 1991	9 September 1992

=== Range states ===
The following are all of the states that have territory within the range of the Agreement, but have yet to sign or ratify it:

Country
Algeria
Andorra
Armenia
Austria
Azerbaijan
Belarus
Egypt
Greece
Holy See
Iran (Islamic Republic of)
Iraq
Jordan
Kazakhstan
Kuwait
Lebanon
Libya
Liechtenstein
Morocco
Palestinian Authority
Russian Federation
Saudi Arabia
Syrian Arab Republic
Tunisia
Turkey
