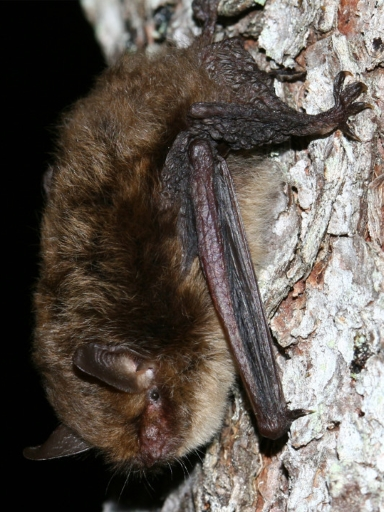

Conservation status
- Data Deficient (IUCN 3.1)

Scientific classification
- Kingdom: Animalia
- Phylum: Chordata
- Class: Mammalia
- Order: Chiroptera
- Family: Vespertilionidae
- Genus: Myotis
- Species: M. alcathoe

Binomial name
- Myotis alcathoe O. von Helversen and K.-G. Heller, 2001
- Distribution of the Alcathoe bat (Myotis alcathoe). Legend: Orange: subspecies Myotis alcathoe alcathoe (filled circles: captured specimens; open circles: echolocation records; crosses: bones found in caves); Blue: subspecies Myotis alcathoe circassicus

= Alcathoe bat =

European bat in the family Vespertilionidae

The Alcathoe bat (Myotis alcathoe) is a European bat in the genus Myotis. Known only from Greece and Hungary when it was first described in 2001, its known distribution has since expanded as far as Portugal, England, Sweden, and Russia. It is similar to the whiskered bat (Myotis mystacinus) and other species and is difficult to distinguish from them. However, its brown fur is distinctive and it is clearly different in characters of its karyotype and DNA sequences. It is most closely related to Myotis hyrcanicus from Iran, but otherwise has no close relatives.

With a forearm length of 30.8 to 34.6 mm (1.21 to 1.36 in) and body weight of 3.5 to 5.5 g (0.12 to 0.19 oz), Myotis alcathoe is a small bat. The fur is usually reddish-brown on the upperparts and brown below, but more greyish in juveniles. The tragus (a projection on the inner side of the ear) is short, as is the ear itself, and the inner side of the ear is pale at the base. The wings are brown and the baculum (penis bone) is short and broad. M. alcathoe has a very high-pitched echolocation call, with a frequency that falls from 120 kHz at the beginning of the call to about 43 kHz at the end.

Usually found in old-growth deciduous forest near water, Myotis alcathoe forages high in the canopy and above water and mostly eats flies. The animal roosts in cavities high in trees. Although there are some winter records from caves, it may also spend the winter in tree cavities. Several parasites have been recorded on M. alcathoe. The IUCN Red List assesses Myotis alcathoe as "data deficient", but it is considered threatened in several areas because of its rarity and vulnerability to habitat loss.

== Taxonomy ==
The whiskered bat (Myotis mystacinus) and similar species in Eurasia (collectively known as "whiskered bats") are difficult to distinguish from each other; for example, the distantly related Brandt's bat (Myotis brandtii) was not recognised as distinct from M. mystacinus until the 1970s. Small, unusual M. mystacinus-like bats were first recorded in Greece in the 1970s, but it was not until the advent of genetic studies that these bats could be confirmed as representing a distinct species, named Myotis alcathoe. In 2001, the species was described by German zoologists Otto von Helversen and Klaus-Gerhard Heller on the basis of specimens from Greece and Hungary. Although it also differs from other whiskered bats by morphological characters, Myotis alcathoe is most clearly distinct in its genetics, including DNA sequences and the location of the nucleolus organiser regions. Two studies used microsatellite markers on European whiskered bats: the first one used western European samples and recovered three well-defined species clusters for M. alcathoe, M. brandtii and M. mystacinus; the other one, conducted in Poland, suggesting a high level of hybridisation with other whiskered bats that would further complicate attempts to identify M. alcathoe morphologically.

Von Helversen and Heller argued that none of the old names now considered synonyms of M. mystacinus could apply to M. alcathoe, because these names all have their type localities in western or central Europe. However, the more recent discovery of M. alcathoe further to the west renders it possible that an older name may be discovered. In addition, Russian researcher Suren Gazaryan has suggested that the name caucasicus Tsytsulina, 2000 (originally proposed for a subspecies of M. mystacinus from the Caucasus) may prove to be applicable to M. alcathoe; in that case, the species would be renamed Myotis caucasicus. However, a later analysis instead attributed the name caucasicus to the eastern species Myotis davidii. M. alcathoe may have remained undetected in Germany for so long because bat researchers did not sample its preferred habitats and would dismiss unusual-looking whiskered bats as being abnormal M. mystacinus or M. brandtii.

On the basis of mitochondrial DNA sequence analysis, Myotis alcathoe first appeared close to Geoffroy's bat (Myotis emarginatus) of southern Europe, North Africa, and southwestern Asia. However, a study of the mitochondrial cytochrome b gene incorporating many Myotis species did not support this relationship, and could not place M. alcathoe securely at a specific position among Eurasian Myotis. In 2012, a closely related species, Myotis hyrcanicus, was described from Iran. It is morphologically difficult to distinguish from M. alcathoe, but sufficiently distinct genetically to be considered a separate species.

The population of Myotis alcathoe in Krasnodar Krai on the Russian Black Sea coast is genetically distinct from populations in the rest of Europe and is accordingly recognised as a subspecies, Myotis alcathoe circassicus, first named in 2016. Within the remaining populations (subspecies Myotis alcathoe alcathoe), two groups with slightly divergent mitochondrial DNA sequences (separated by 1.3 to 1.4% sequence divergence) are distinguishable within the species, which probably correspond to different glacial refugia where M. alcathoe populations survived the last glacial period. One, known as the "Hungarian" group, has been recorded from Spain, France, Austria, Hungary, and Slovakia, and probably corresponds to a refugium in Iberia; the other, the "Greek" group, is known only from Greece and Slovakia.

The specific name, alcathoe, refers to Alcathoe, a figure from Greek mythology who was turned into a bat when she refused the advances of the god Dionysus. She was associated with gorges and small streams, the preferred habitat of Myotis alcathoe in Greece. In their original description, von Helversen and colleagues described her as a nymph, and the common name "nymph bat" has therefore been used for this species. However, none of the classical sources speak of Alcathoe as a nymph; instead, she was a princess, the daughter of King Minyas of Orchomenos. Therefore, Petr Benda recommended in 2008 that the common name "Alcathoe bat" or "Alcathoe myotis" be used instead. Other common names include "Alcathoe's bat" and "Alcathoe whiskered bat". The name of the subspecies M. a. circassicus refers to Circassia, a historical region of the northwestern Caucasus.

== Description ==
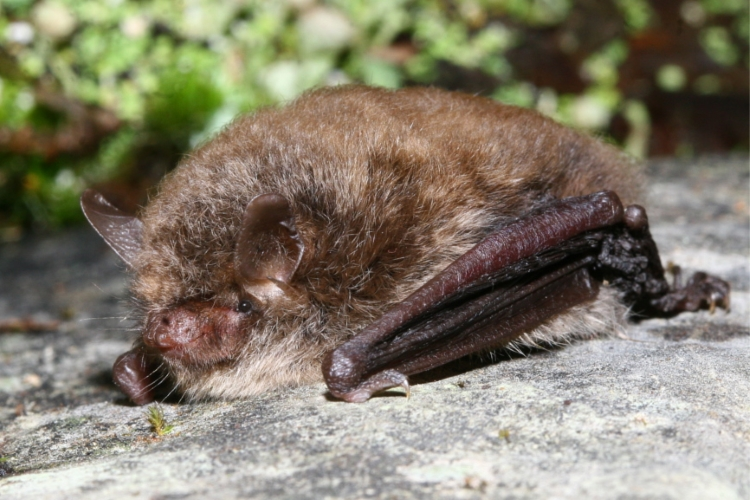
An Alcathoe bat from Switzerland

Myotis alcathoe is the smallest European Myotis species. The fur is brownish on the upperparts, with a reddish tone in old specimens, and a slightly paler grey-brown below. Younger animals may be completely grey-brown. The brown fur distinguishes adult M. alcathoe from other whiskered bats, but juveniles cannot be unambiguously identified on the basis of morphology. M. alcathoe is similar to Daubenton's bat (Myotis daubentonii) and M. emarginatus in colour. On the upper side of the body, the hairs are 6 to 8 mm long and have dark bases and brown tips. The hairs on the lower side of the body are only slightly paler at the tip than at the base.

The face and the upper lips are reddish to pink, not dark brown to black as in M. mystacinus. Although most of the face is hairy, the area around the eyes is bare. The nostrils are heart-shaped, and their back end is broad, as in M. brandtii, not narrow as in M. mystacinus. Several glands are present on the muzzle, most prominently in reproductively active males. The ears are brown and are lighter on the inside than the outside. There is a notch at the edge of the ear, and the pointed tragus (a projection inside the ear that is present in some bats) extends up to this notch; the tragus is longer, extending beyond the notch, in both M. brandtii and M. mystacinus. The base of the inner side of the ear is white; it is much darker in M. mystacinus. The feet and the thumbs are very small. The small size of the ear, tragus, feet, and thumb distinguishes M. alcathoe from the slightly larger M. mystacinus and M. brandtii, but the feet are relatively larger than in M. mystacinus.

The wings are brown, but lighter than those of M. mystacinus. The plagiopatagium (the portion of the wing between the last digit and the hindlegs) is attached to the fifth toe. The tail extends only about 1 mm beyond the back margin of the uropatagium (the portion of the wing membrane between the hindlegs). The calcar, a cartilaginous spur supporting the uropatagium, is slender. With a width around 1.3 mm, the penis is narrow, and it lacks a broadened tip (except in one Croatian specimen). The baculum (penis bone) is about 0.5 mm long. The short and broad shape of this bone distinguishes M. alcathoe from M. brandtii as well as M. ikonnikovi.

Skull of a specimen caught in Slovakia, redrawn from Benda et al. (2003a)

The skull is similar in shape to that of M. mystacinus and M. brandtii, but the front part of the braincase is higher. The second and third upper premolars (P2 and P3) are tiny and pressed against the upper canine (C1) and fourth premolar (P4). The canine is less well-developed than in M. mystacinus. There is a clear cusp present on the side of the P4. The accessory cusp known as the protoconule is present on each of the upper molars when they are unworn. M. mystacinus lacks the P4 cusp and the protoconules on the molars, but M. brandtii has an even larger cusp on P4. The Caucasus subspecies, M. alcathoe circassicus, has a relatively narrower skull and longer upper molars.

As usual in Myotis species, M. alcathoe has a karyotype consisting of 44 chromosomes, with the fundamental number of chromosomal arms equal to 52. However, a 1987 study already found that M. alcathoe (then called "Myotis sp. B") differs from both M. mystacinus and M. brandtii in the pattern of active nucleolus organiser regions on the chromosomes. M. alcathoe also differs from other Myotis species in the sequences of the mitochondrial genes 12S rRNA and NADH dehydrogenase subunit 1 by at least 5% and 13%, respectively.

M. alcathoe has the highest-frequency echolocation call of any European Myotis. In open terrain, the call has an average duration of 2.5 ms, but it may be up to 4 ms long. At the beginning, its frequency is around 120 kHz, but it then falls fast, subsequently falls slightly slower, and at the end falls faster again. The call reaches its highest amplitude at around 53 kHz. It terminates at around 43 to 46 kHz; this characteristic is especially distinctive. In different experiments, the time between calls was found to be around 85 and 66 ms, respectively. The high-pitched call may be an adaptation to the animal's occurrence in dense vegetation.

The head and body length is about 4 cm (1.6 in), and the wingspan around 20 cm (7.9 in). Forearm length is 30.8 to 34.6 mm (1.21 to 1.36 in), tibia length is 13.5 to 15.9 mm (0.53 to 0.63 in), hindfoot length is 5.1 to 5.8 mm (0.20 to 0.23 in), and body weight is 3.3 to 5.5 g (0.12 to 0.19 oz). In the subspecies M. a. circassicus, the forearm length is 30.1 to 34.2 millimetres (1.19 to 1.35 in) and ear length 13.0 to 14.6 millimetres (0.51 to 0.57 in).

== Distribution and habitat ==
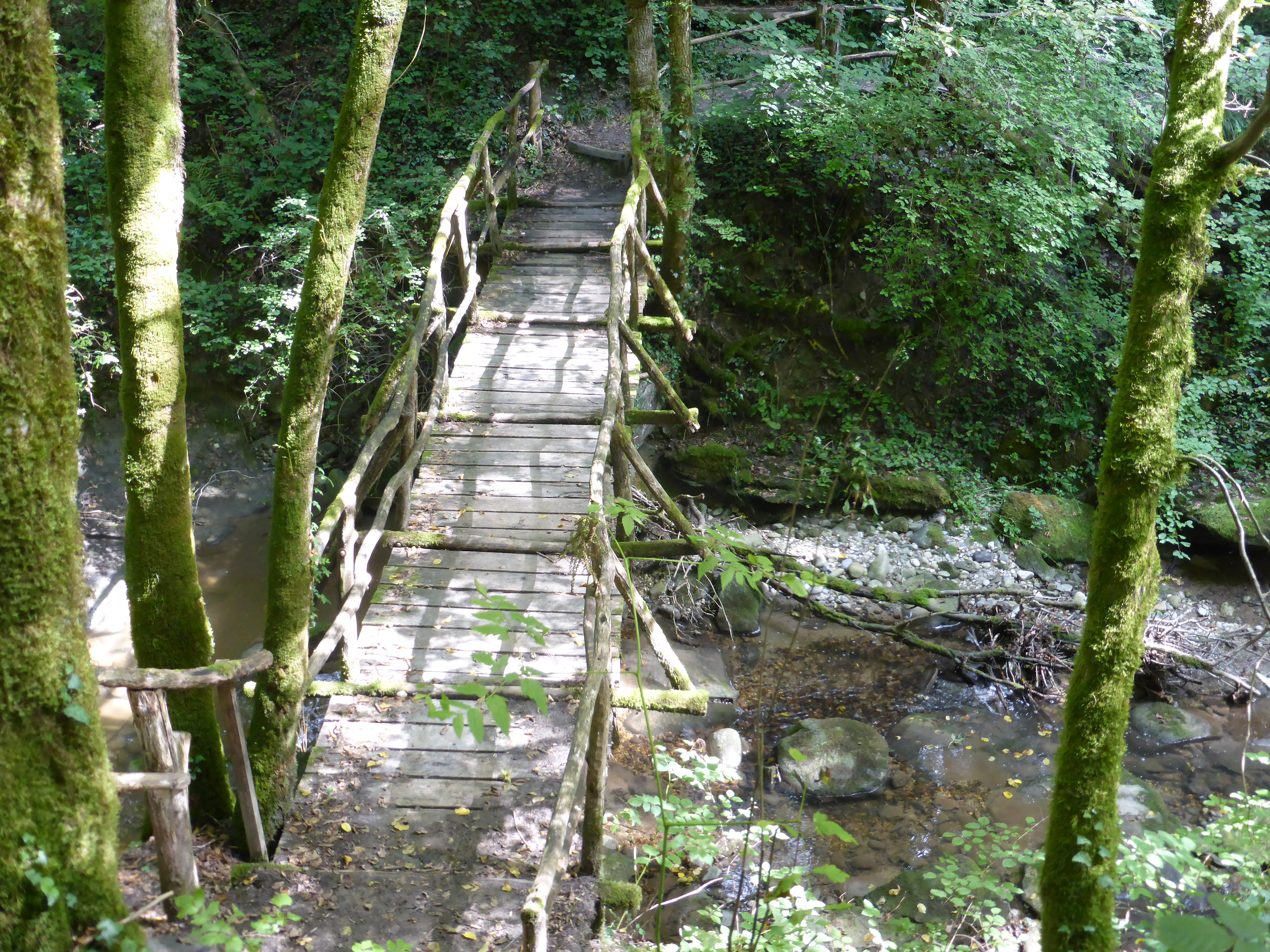
A hunting ground of M. alcathoe in Dardagny, Switzerland

Although Myotis alcathoe was initially known only from Greece and Hungary and was thought to be restricted to southeast Europe, records since then have greatly expanded its range, and it is now known from Portugal, Spain and England to Sweden and European Turkey. In several European countries, focused searches were conducted to detect its occurrence. Its habitat generally consists of moist, deciduous, mature forest near streams, for example in ravines or in alluvial forest (forest near a river), where there are many decaying trees that the bat can use as roosting sites. In Germany, its preferred habitat consists of mixed deciduous forest. In the south of the continent, it usually occurs in mountain ranges, but the factors affecting its distribution in the north are less well known. Its range appears to be similar in shape to those of the greater and lesser horseshoe bats (Rhinolophus ferrumequinum and R. hipposideros) and Geoffroy's bat (Myotis emarginatus). It may yet be found in other European countries, such as Ireland and Moldova. Although there are abundant records from some areas, such as France and Hungary, the species appears to be rare in most of its range.

Known records are as follows:

Albania
A single specimen was caught in 2006 in a forest of oriental plane (Platanus orientalis) and poplars (Populus spp.) next to a small stream. M. mystacinus was recorded at the same place.
Austria
Three specimens of M. alcathoe were recorded in Burgenland, southeastern Austria, in 2006. As of 2015, the species is known from 65 localities in the east of the country, in the states of Lower Austria, Styria, Vienna, and Burgenland. In Carinthia only echolocation records are known.
Azerbaijan
The species was recorded around 2009.
Belgium
The species was first recorded in 2011 and is now known from several localities in the provinces of Namur and Hainaut, including a swarming site at a cave in Rochefort. Acoustic evidence also suggests the presence of the species in the provinces of Liège and Luxembourg.
Bosnia and Herzegovina
A specimen was caught in 2018 near Sarajevo.
Bulgaria
The species is known from six localities in the south and west of the country; the first record dates from 2003. Habitats include river and mountain forests.
Croatia
In 2003, M. alcathoe was recorded here on the basis of two specimens; three additional specimens were found in 2004.
Czech Republic
Here, the species was recorded at nine sites clustered in three regions, with the first record dating from 2001, in addition to records from roadkilled specimens at three further sites. The typical habitat was mature oak-hornbeam forest near water with dead, decaying trees, at altitudes ranging from 170 to 390 m (560 to 1,280 ft). Both M. mystacinus and M. brandtii occur in some of the same places in this country. M. alcathoe has a limited, patchy distribution within the country, but reaches a high abundance in suitable habitat.
France
M. alcathoe was informally recognised in France in 2000 as a small Myotis similar to M. mystacinus, the "Murin cantalou"; in 2002, it was realised that this bat represents M. alcathoe. A large number of sites are known, mostly in the north of the country. The species reaches altitudes of up to 2,000 m (6,600 ft). It is usually found close to water, but it has been found in a variety of habitats, including farmlands, swamps, forests, and wooden grounds. In late summer and autumn, it occurs in caves.
Germany
The species is known from two different areas in the country. In 2005 and 2006, specimens were caught in an old moist forest near the Rhine in western Baden-Württemberg. Two other bats were found in highway tunnels close to this site. The species is also known from the Kyffhäuser hill range of Thuringia in central Germany, an island of relatively warm habitat with some unusual wildlife. There, bats were caught near a spring in a karst landscape amid oak-dominated deciduous forest. The species was also recorded in deciduous forest at a former Soviet military training site in eastern Thuringia. M. alcathoe has also been recorded in the nearby states of Saxony-Anhalt and Saxony, where it occurs in mixed deciduous forest. Many Saxony-Anhalt records are from near water. However, the species was also recorded in the center of the city of Chemnitz in Saxony.
Greece
The species has been recorded in the Pindus and Rhodopi Mountains of central and northern Greece. Here, M. alcathoe is usually found in stands of plane or alder trees next to small streams in ravines. The bat hunts close to the trees, within the stand. It is often found together with the lesser horseshoe bat and with M. mystacinus.
Hungary
M. alcathoe is not uncommon in the mountain forests of northeastern Hungary. It has been found at brooks and lakes in oak, beech, alder, and hornbeam (Carpinetum) forests at 230 to 670 m (750 to 2,200 ft) altitude. Both M. brandtii and M. mystacinus occur together with M. alcathoe there.
Italy
M. alcathoe has been recorded in beech forest in Majella National Park in the region of Abruzzo. Additional specimens of M. alcathoe have been identified in Italy using molecular methods. In December 2013 its presence has been confirmed in the protected area of Appennino Lucano National Park (Basilicata).
Latvia
A small Myotis was captured at a cave in Latvia between 2007 and 2010; pending genetic testing, it is suspected to be M. alcathoe. However, this record had not been confirmed in the subsequent national report to EUROBATS in 2014.
Luxembourg
A single male was caught in 2011 and confirmed as M. alcathoe on the basis of genetic data. Elsewhere in the country it has been recorded on the basis of acoustic data.
Montenegro
A female was captured in 2002 near Stabna. Both Myotis brandtii and M. mystacinus were recorded at the same place.
Poland
The species was recorded in four caves in southern Poland in 2005 and 2006, and later at several other sites in the south of the country. It is known from 182 to 1,294 m (597 to 4,245 ft) above sea level, most often in beech forest (Fagus sylvatica), but also in several other forest types.
Portugal
A single specimen at first thought to be Myotis mystacinus was discovered in 2005 at the Peneda-Gerês National Park. In 2020, a genetic analysis of that same specimen later revealed it was actually M. alcathoe.
Romania
A single M. alcathoe was captured in 2007 in a nature reserve in the eastern Carpathians; the reserve contains riverine and conifer forest. The species was additionally recorded in a forested valley containing a small stream in Alba County.
Russia
Bats collected in Krasnodar Krai on the Russian Black Sea cost from 2003 to 2009 were initially tentatively identified as Myotis cf. alcathoe by Russian biologist Suren Gazaryan. Later, genetic and morphological evidence confirmed that these specimens represent Myotis alcathoe, but they were assigned to a new subspecies, Myotis alcathoe circassicus. The subspecies may be more widely distributed in the Caucasus area, for example in North Ossetia and northeastern Turkey.
Serbia
The species was reported on the basis of three specimens shortly before 2009, but is probably rare.
Slovakia
Here, M. alcathoe was first reported from a single site in 2003, but by 2010 it was known from more than twenty sites in eastern Slovakia at altitudes ranging from 100 to 540 metres (330 to 1,770 ft), mostly in oak and beech forests.
Slovenia
A single specimen was recorded in Slovenia in 2007, although it is not clear how many bats previously recorded as Myotis mystacinus belong to this species. Several additional specimens were later found in Kočevski Rog (SE Slovenia).
Spain
In Catalonia, the species is known from six sites, ranging from sea level to 1,200 m (3,900 ft) altitude. It is known in beech and riverine forest and was first recorded in 2006. The species is known from three sites in La Rioja, where it was recorded in 2004, and occurs amidst beech and riverine forest at 790 to 1,390 m (2,590 to 4,560 ft) altitude. It has also been found at seven localities in Navarre, with the first record dating from 2004. There, it occurs in beech and oak forest at altitudes from 140 to 980 m (460 to 3,220 ft). In Galicia, it is known from three localities at 300 to 680 m (980 to 2,230 ft) above sea level.
Sweden
The species was recorded at five sites in the south of the country, starting in 2008, on the basis of echolocation calls.
Switzerland
M. alcathoe has been recorded from the Col du Marchairuz in the Jura Mountains (canton of Vaud). The species was acoustically detected in 2003 in the canton of Geneva, and subsequent captures led to the discovery of the first breeding sites for the country.
Turkey
Eight individuals have been caught at three sites in close vicinity in the European part of the country in 2006. A parasitological study found three specimens in Bursa Province.
Ukraine
In 2009, the possible occurrence of M. alcathoe in Ukraine was recorded. In 2011, the species was definitively recorded there on the basis of two bats caught in the far southwest of the country in 2009.
United Kingdom
M. alcathoe has been recorded in England since 2003, and is known from two swarming sites in the south and a third site in the north of the country. The northern England site, in Ryedale, is in a protected area with many old trees, and the southern sites (in Sussex) are in woodland.

Early records of Myotis ikonnikovi—now known to be an eastern Asian species—from Ukraine, Bulgaria, and Romania may also pertain to this species. Because whiskered bats in many cases cannot easily be distinguished from each other without the use of genetic methods, some listings do not differentiate between them; records of M. alcathoe and/or M. mystacinus and/or (in some cases) M. brandtii have been reported from Bulgaria, Belgium, and Montenegro.

== Ecology and behaviour ==
Myotis alcathoe is a rare species with narrow ecological requirements. According to a study in the Czech Republic, the diet of Myotis alcathoe mostly consists of nematoceran flies, but caddisflies, spiders, small lepidopterans, and neuropterans are also taken. However, in eastern Slovakia moths were most common, though ants and nematocerans were also common prey items. The presence of spiders in the diet suggests that the species gleans prey from foliage. It forages mainly high in the canopy and over water, and is often found in dense vegetation. When caught, individuals of M. alcathoe are much calmer than M. mystacinus or M. brandtii.

M. alcathoe lives in small groups. In Greece, a maternity colony, containing three females and two juveniles, has been found in a plane tree. Additional roosts were found high in oak trees in Baden-Württemberg and Saxony-Anhalt. Twenty-seven roosting sites have been found in the Czech Republic, all but one in trees (the last was in a concrete pole). Most of the tree roosts were in oaks (Quercus robur); others were in limes (Tilia cordata), birches (Betula pendula), and various other species. Its strong preference for roosting sites in trees is unusual among European bats. Roosts tend to be located high in the canopy, and are often in old trees. In summer, roosts may contain large groups of up to 80 individuals, but autumn roosts in the Czech Republic are occupied by smaller groups. M. alcathoe swarms from late July to mid-September in southern Poland.

In Saxony-Anhalt, the species forages deep in valleys when temperatures are above 10 °C (50 °F), but on warmer slopes or rocky areas when it is colder. There, M. alcathoe is relatively easy to capture in August, because M. brandtii and M. mystacinus already start swarming in late July. Although there are some records of M. alcathoe in caves during the winter, it is also possible that animals spend the winter in tree cavities, and whether swarming behaviour occurs in M. alcathoe is unclear. An animal found in a cave in Saxony-Anhalt in January was not sleeping deeply. Reproduction may also take place in caves, but pregnant females have been found as late as June. Relatively many juveniles are caught between July and September. In England, one individual of M. alcathoe was captured in 2003 (and identified at the time as M. brandtii) and again in 2009. Three individuals that were telemetrically tracked (in eastern France, Thuringia, and Baden-Württemberg, respectively) moved only 800 m (2,600 ft), 935 m (3,068 ft), and 1,440 m (4,720 ft) from their night quarters; M. brandtii and M. mystacinus tend to move over longer distances. A study in Poland suggested frequent hybridisation among M. alcathoe, M. brandtii, and M. mystacinus sharing the same swarming sites, probably attributable to male-biased sex ratios (1.7:1 in M. alcathoe), a polygynous mating system, and the high number of bats at swarming sites. M. alcathoe showed a particularly high proportion of hybrids, perhaps because it occurs at lower densities than the other two species.

The following parasites have been recorded from Myotis alcathoe:

- Babesia vesperuginis, an apicomplexan blood parasite, in Romania
- Bat flies in the genus Basilia:
  - Basilia italica in Hungary and Slovakia
  - Basilia mongolensis nudior in Thuringia
- Cimex emarginatus, a true bug, found on a bat tentatively identified as Myotis alcathoe from Bulgaria
- Ticks in the genus Ixodes:
  - Ixodes ariadnae in Hungary
  - Ixodes simplex in Slovakia
  - Ixodes vespertilionis in Romania and Slovakia
- Spinturnix mystacina, a parasitic mite, in Switzerland and Slovakia. The mites on M. alcathoe, M. brandtii, and M. mystacinus are genetically closely related.
- Helminths, all in Turkey:
  - Prosthodendrium ascidia
  - Lecithodendrium linstowi
  - Plagiorchis koreanus
  - Plagiorchis elegans

== Conservation status ==
Because Myotis alcathoe remains poorly known, it is assessed as "Data Deficient" on the IUCN Red List. However, it may be endangered because of its narrow ecological preferences. Reservoir construction may threaten the species' habitat in some places; two Greek sites where it has been recorded have already been destroyed. Forest loss is another possible threat, and the species may be restricted to undisturbed habitats. Because of its patchy distribution and likely small population, it probably does not easily colonise new habitats. The species is protected by national and international measures, but the IUCN Red List recommends further research on various aspects of the species as well as efforts to increase public awareness of the animal. In addition, old forests need to be conserved and the species' cave roosts need to be protected.

In Catalonia, the species is listed as "Endangered" in view of its apparent rarity there. The Red List of Germany's Endangered Vertebrates lists M. alcathoe as "Critically Endangered" as of 2009. In the Genevan region, the species is also listed as "Critically Endangered" as of 2015. In Hungary, where the species is probably not uncommon in suitable habitat, it has been protected since 2005. However, the species is declining there and is threatened by habitat loss and disturbance of caves.

== Literature cited ==
- Agirre-Mendi, P.T., García-Mudarra, J.L., Juste, J. and Ibáñez, C. 2004. Presence of Myotis alcathoe Helversen and Heller, 2001 (Chiroptera: Vespertilionidae) in the Iberian Peninsula (subscription required). Acta Chiropterologica 6:49–57.
- Ahlén, I. 2010. Nymffladdermus Myotis alcathoe – en nyupptäckt art i Sverige. Fauna och Flora 105(4):8–15 (in Swedish).
- Alcalde, J.T. 2010. Myotis alcathoe Helversen & Heller, 2001 y Pipistrellus pygmaeus (Leach, 1825), nuevas especies de quirópteros para Navarra. Munibe (Ciencias Naturales–Natur Zientziak) 57:225–236 (in Spanish).
- Arzúa, M., Hermida, R.J., Seage, R., Graña, D.A., Cerqueira, F., Lamas, F.J. and Conde, F. Undated. Results of the bats inventory in the Fragas do Eume National Park (A Coruña). Asociación Española para la Conservación y el Estudio de los Murciélagos "SECEMU". Downloaded December 26, 2010.
- Babić, N., Nicević, M. and Šafhauzer, M. 2018. Prvi nalaz patuljastog brkatog šišmiša (Myotis alcathoe) u Bosni i Hercegovini i preliminarni spisak faune šišmiša na Zaštićenom pejzažu Bentbaša (Bosna i Hercegovina). Hypsugo 3(2):4-13.
- Balvín, O., Bartonička, T., Simov, N., Paunović, M. and Vilímová, J. 2014. Distribution and host relations of species of the genusCimexon bats in Europe. Folia Zoologica 63(4):281-289.
- Bashta, A.-T., Piskorski, M., Mysłajek, R.W., Tereba, A., Kurek, K. and Sachanowicz, K. 2011. Myotis alcathoe in Poland and Ukraine: new data on its status and habitat in Central Europe. Folia Zoologica 60(1):1–4.
- Benda, P. 2004. First record of Myotis aurascens and second record of Myotis brandtii in Montenegro. Lynx, Praha (n.s.) 35:13–18.
- Benda, P. 2008. Names from Greek and Roman mythology in bat nomenclature, with a note on the name Myotis alcathoe. Vespertilio 12:107–128 (in Czech).
- Benda, P., Ruedi, M. and Uhrin, M. 2003a. First record of Myotis alcathoe (Chiroptera: Vespertilionidae) in Slovakia. Folia Zoologica 52(4):359–365.
- Benda, P., Ivanova, T., Horáček, I., Hanák, V., Červen, J., Gaisler, J., Gueorguieva, A., Petrov, B. and Vohralík, V. 2003b. Review of bat distribution in Bulgaria. Acta Societatis Zoologicae Bohemicae 67:245–357.
- Benda, P., Faizolâhi, K., Andreas, M., Obuch, J., Reiter, A., Ševčík, M., Uhrin, M., Vallo, P. and Ashrafi, S. 2012. Bats (Mammalia: Chiroptera) of the Eastern Mediterranean and Middle East. Part 10. Bat fauna of Iran. Acta Societatis Zoologicae Bohemicae 76:163-582.
- Benda, P., Gazaryan, S. and Vallo, P. 2016. On the distribution and taxonomy of bats of the Myotis mystacinus morphogroup from the Caucasus region (Chiroptera: Vespertilionidae). Turkish Journal of Zoology 40:842-863.
- Bogdanowicz, W., Piksa, K. and Tereba, A. 2012. Hybridization hotspots at bat swarming sites. PLoS ONE 7(12):e53334.
- Brinkmann, R. and Niermann, I. 2007. Erste Untersuchungen zum Status und zur Lebensraumnutzung der Nymphenfledermaus (Myotis alcathoe) am südlichen Oberrhein (Baden-Württemberg). Mitteilungen des Badischen Landesvereins für Naturkunde und Naturschutz 20(1):197–210 (in German).
- Bruyndonckx, N., Dubey, S., Ruedi, M. and Christe, P. 2009. Molecular cophylogenetic relationships between European bats and their ectoparasitic mites (Acari, Spinturnicidae) (subscription required). Molecular Phylogenetics and Evolution 51:227–237.
- Corduneanu, A., Hrazdilová, K., Sándor, A.D., Matei, I.A., Ionică, A.M., Barti, L., Ciocănău, M.-A., Măntoiu, D.Ș., Coroiu, I., Hornok, S., Fuehrer, H.-P., Leitner, N., Bagó, Z., Stefke, K., Modrý, D. and Mihalca, A.D. 2017. Babesia vesperuginis, a neglected piroplasmid: new host and geographical records, and phylogenetic relations. Parasites & Vectors 10(598):1-8.
- Croatian Natural History Museum. 2005. Agreement on the conservation of bats in Europe. Fourth Report to the National Implementation of the Agreement, Croatia. 2004–2006. Inf.EUROBATS.AC11.28. Downloaded January 30, 2011.
- Danko, Š., Krištín, A. and Krištofík, J. 2010. Myotis alcathoe in eastern Slovakia: occurrence, diet, ectoparasites and notes on its identification in the field. Vespertilio 13–14:77-91.
- De Pasquale, P. P., Galimberti, A. 2014. New records of the Alcathoe bat, Myotis alcathoe (Vespertilionidae) for Italy. Barbastella 7(1), pp XX ISSN 1576-9720.
- Dietz, C. and von Helversen, O. 2004. Illustrated identification key to the bats of Europe. Downloaded December 26, 2010.
- Dietz, C., von Helversen, O. and Nill, D. 2007. Handbuch der Fledermäuse Europas und Nordwestafrikas. Kosmos, 399 pp. (in German). ISBN 3-440-09693-9
- Federal Ministry for the Environment, Nature Conservation and Nuclear Safety. 2010. National Report on Bat Conservation in the Federal Republic of Germany. 2006–2009. Inf.EUROBATS.MoP6.21. Downloaded January 30, 2011.
- Flaquer, C., Puig, X., Fàbregas, E., Guixé, D., Torre, I., Ràfols, R.G., Páramo, F., Camprodon, J., Cumplido, J.M., Ruiz-Jarillo, R., Baucells, A.L., Freixas, L. and Arrizabalaga, A. 2010. Revisión y aportación de datos sobre quirópteros de Catalunya: Propuesta de lista roja. Galemys 22(1):29–61 (in Spanish).
- Galimberti, A., Martinoli, A., Russo, D., Mucedda, M. and Casiraghi, M. 2010. Molecular identification of Italian mouse-eared bats (genus Myotis). Pp. 289–294 in Nimis, P.L. and Vignes Lebbe, R. (eds.). Tools for Identifying Biodiversity: Progress and Problems. Edizioni Università di Trieste. ISBN 978-88-8303-295-0
- Gazaryan, Suren Vladimirovich (2009). "Новый вид ночниц на Кавказе: Myotis alcathoe или Myotis caucasicus?" [A new mouse-eared bat species from the Caucasus: Myotis alcathoe or Myotis caucasicus?] (PDF). Plecotus et Al. (in Russian). 11–12: 50–61.
- Gessner, B. 2012. Teichfledermaus (Myotis dasycneme Boie, 1825) und Nymphenfledermaus (Myotis alcathoe Helversen & Heller, 2001), zwei neue Fledermausarten für Luxemburg. Bulletin de la Société des naturalistes luxembourgeois 113:137–140.
- Heddergott, M. 2009. First record of the bat-fly Basilia mongolensis nudior Hurka, 1972 in Germany (Diptera: Nycteribiidae) (abstract only). Studia Dipterologica 15(1–2):301–304.
- Helversen, O. von. 2004. Myotis alcathoe v. Helversen und Heller, 2001 – Nymphenfledermaus. Pp. 1159–1167 in Niethammer, J. and Krapp, F. (eds.). Handbuch der Säugetiere Europas, Volume 4: Fledertiere, Part II: Chiroptera II (Vespertilionidae 2, Molossidae, Nycteridae). Wiebelsheim, Germany: Aula-Verlag, pp. x + 605–1186 (in German). ISBN 3-89104-639-1
- Helversen, O. von, Heller, K.G., Mayer, F., Nemeth, A., Volleth, M. and Gombkötö, P. 2001. Cryptic mammalian species: a new species of whiskered bat (Myotis alcathoe n. sp.) in Europe (subscription required). Naturwissenschaften 88:217–223.
- Hermida, R.J., Lamas, F.J., Graña, D.A., Rial, S., Cerqueira, F., Arzúa, M. and Seage, R. 2012. Contribución al conocimiento de la distribución de los Murciélagos (O. Chiroptera) en Galicia. Galemys, Spanish Journal of Mammalogy 24:1–11.
- Hornok, S., Kontschán, J., Kováts, D., Kovács, R., Angyal, D., Görföl, T., Polacsek, Z., Kalmár, Z. and Mihalca, A.D. 2014. Bat ticks revisited: Ixodes ariadnae sp. nov. and allopatric genotypes of I. vespertilionis in caves of Hungary. Parasites & Vectors 7(1):202.
- Hutson, A.M.; Paunović, M. (2016). "Myotis alcathoe". IUCN Red List of Threatened Species. 2016 e.T136680A518740. doi:10.2305/IUCN.UK.2016-2.RLTS.T136680A518740.en.
- Jan, C.M.I., Frith, K., Glover, A.M., Butlin, R.K., Scott, C.D., Greenaway, F., Ruedi, M., Frantz, A.C., Dawson, D.A. and Altringham, J.D. 2010. Myotis alcathoe confirmed in the UK from mitochondrial and microsatellite DNA (subscription required). Acta Chiropterologica 12(2):471–483.
- Jére, C. and Dóczy, A. 2007. Prima semnalare a speciei de liliac Myotis alcathoe Helversen et Heller, 2001 (Chiroptera, Vespertilionidae) din România. Acta Siculica 2007:179–183 (in Romanian).
- Kervyn, T., Lamotte, S., Nyssen, P. and Verschuren, J. 2009. Major decline of bat abundance and diversity during the last 50 years in southern Belgium. Belgian Journal of Zoology 139(2):124–132.
- Krištofík, J. and Danko, Š. 2012. Arthropod ectoparasites (Acarina, Heteroptera, Diptera, Siphonaptera) of bats in Slovakia. Vespertilio 16:167-189.
- Lučan, R.K., Andreas, M., Benda, P., Bartonička, T., Březinová, T., Hoffmannová, A., Hulová, Š., Hulva, P., Neckářová, J., Reiter, A., Svačina, T., Šálek, M. and Horáček, I. 2009. Alcathoe bat (Myotis alcathoe) in the Czech Republic: distributional status, roosting and feeding ecology (subscription required). Acta Chiropterologica 11(1):61–69.
- Mayer, F., Dietz, C. and Kiefer, A. 2007. Molecular species identification boosts bat diversity. Frontiers in Zoology 2007(4):4.
- Mihalca, A.D., Dumitrache, M.O., Magdaş, C., Gherman, C.M., Domşa, C., Mircean, V., Ghira, I.V., Pocora, V., Ionescu, D.T., Sikó Barabási, S., Cozma, V. and Sándor, A.D. 2012. Synopsis of the hard ticks (Acari: Ixodidae) of Romania with update on host associations and geographical distribution (subscription required). Experimental and Applied Acarology 58(2):183–206.
- Ministry of Environment and Spatial Planning, Republic of Serbia. 2009. National report on the implementation of the Agreement on the Conservation of Bats in Europe. Inf.EUROBATS.Ac14.18. Downloaded January 30, 2011.
- Ministry of Environment of the Republic of Latvia. 2010. Agreement on the conservation of bats in Europe. Report on the implementation of the agreement in Latvia. 2007–2010. Inf.EUROBATS.MoP6.25. Downloaded December 26, 2010.
- Ministry of Rural Development. 2010. Report on the implementation of 'EUROBATS' in Hungary. Inf.EUROBATS.MoP6.22. Downloaded January 30, 2011.
- Niermann, I., Biedermann, M., Bogdanowicz, W., Brinkmann, R., Le Bris, Y., Ciechanowski, M., Dietz, C., Dietz, I., Estók, P., von Helversen, O., Le Houédec, A., Paksuz, S., Petrov, B.P., Özkan, B., Piksa, K., Rachwald, A., Roué, S.Y., Sachanowicz, K., Schorcht, W., Tereba, A. and Mayer, F. 2007. Biogeography of the recently described Myotis alcathoe von Helversen and Heller, 2001. Acta Chiropterologica 9(2):361–378.
- Nyssen, P., Smits, Q., Van de Sijpe, M., Vandendriessche, B., Halfmaerten, D. and Dekeukeleire, D. 2015. First records of Myotis alcathoe von Helversen & Heller, 2001 in Belgium. Belgian Journal of Zoology 145(2):130-136.
- Ohlendorf, B. 2009a. Status und Schutz der Nymphenfledermaus in Sachsen-Anhalt. Naturschutz im Land Sachsen-Anhalt 45(2):44–49 (in German).
- Ohlendorf, B. 2009b. Aktivitäten der Nymphenfledermaus (Myotis alcathoe) vor Felsquartieren und erster Winternachweis im Harz (Sachsen-Anhalt). Nyctalus (n.s.) 14(1–2):149–157.
- Ohlendorf, B. and Funkel, C. 2008. Zum Vorkommen der Nymphenfledermaus, Myotis alcathoe von Helversen & Heller, 2001, in Sachsen-Anhalt. Teil 1: Vorkommen und Verbreitung (Stand 2007). Nyctalus (n.s.) 13(2–3):99–114 (in German).
- Ohlendorf, B. and Hoffmann, R. 2009. Nachweis der Nymphenfledermaus (Myotis alcathoe) in Rumänien. Nyctalus (n.s.) 14(1–2):110–118.
- Ohlendorf, B., Francke, R., Meisel, F., Schmidt, S., Wolton, A. and Hinkel, A. 2008. Erste Nachweise der Nymphenfledermaus Myotis alcathoe in Sachsen. Nyctalus (n.s.) 13(2–3):118–121 (in German).
- Parco Nazionale della Majella. 2008. Un nuovo mammifero in Italia: il pipistrello Vespertilio di Alcathoe al Parco Nazionale della Majella. Press release. Downloaded December 26, 2010 (in Italian).
- Pavlinić, I., Tvrtković, N. and Podnar, M. 2012. Preliminary data on genetics and morphometrics of Myotis alcathoe (Chiroptera, Vespertilionidae) in Croatia (subscription required). Mammalia 76(3):331–334.
- Presetnik, P. 2012. Opis prvih najdb nimfnega netopirja (Myotis alcathoe) v Sloveniji [Descriptions of first records of Myotis alcathoe in Slovenia]. Natura Sloveniae 14(1): 5–13 (in Slovenian, with English abstract)
- Presetnik, P., Podgorelec, M., Grobelnik, V. and Šalamun, A. 2007. Monitoring populacij izbranih ciljnih vrst netopirjev (Zaključno poročilo). Naročnik: Ministrstvo za okolje in prostor, Ljubljana. Center za kartografijo favne in flore, Miklavţ na Dravskem polju, 251 pp. (in Slovenian).
- Presetnik, P., Paunović, M., Karapandža, B., Đurović, M., Ivanović, Č., Ždralević, M., Benda, P. and Budinski, I. 2014. Distribution of bats (Chiroptera) in Montenegro. Vespertilio 17:129-156.
- Prüger, J. and Bergner, U. 2008. Erstnachweis der Nymphenfledermaus (Myotis alcathoe von Helversen & Heller, 2001) in Ostthüringen. Nyctalus 13(2–3):115–117 (in German).
- Rakhmatulina, I. 2010. Agreement on the Conservation of Bats in Europe. Report on the implementation of the Agreement in Azerbaijan Republic. Inf.EUROBATS.MoP6.43. Downloaded January 30, 2011.
- Řehák, Z., Bartonička, T., Bryja, J. and Gaisler, J. 2008. New records of the Alcathoe bat, Myotis alcathoe in Moravia (Czech Republic). Folia Zoologica 57(4):465–469.
- Reiter, G., Bruckner, A., Kubista, C.E., Plank, M., Pollheimer, M., Suarez-Rubio, M., Wegleitner, S. and Hüttmeir, U. 2015. Vorkommen der Nymphenfledermaus 'Myotis alcathoe' in Österreich. Pp. 85–97 in Anonymous (eds.). Verbreitung und Ökologie der Nymphenfledermaus. Bayerisches Landesamt für Umwelt, 150 pp.
- Ruedi, M., Jourde, P., Giosa, P., Barataud, M. and Roué, S.Y. 2002. DNA reveals the existence of Myotis alcathoe in France (Chiroptera: Vespertilionidae). Revue suisse de Zoologie 109(3):643–652.
- Sauerbier, W., Schorcht, W. and Hörning, L. 2006. Erstentdeckung der Nymphenfledermaus (Myotis alcathoe) in Mitteldeutschland. Beiträge zur Kyffhäuserlandschaft (Regionalmuseum Bad Frankenhausen) 20:58–59 (in German).
- Schorcht, W., Inken, K. and Biedermann, M. 2009. Die Nymphenfledermaus (Myotis alcathoe von Helversen & Heller, 2001) im Kyffhäusergebirge/Thüringen (Mammalia: Chiroptera) – Aktuelle Kenntnisse zu Vorkommen und Habitatnutzung. Vernate 28:115–129 (in German).
- Schunger, I., Dietz, C., Merdschanova, D., Merdschanov, S., Christov, K., Borissov, I., Staneva, S. and Petrov, P. 2004. Swarming of bats (Chiroptera, Mammalia) in the Vodnite Dupki cave (Central Balkan National Park, Bulgaria). Acta Zoologica Bulgarica 56(3):323–330.
- Simmons, N.B. (2005). "Order Chiroptera". In Wilson, D.E.; Reeder, D.M (eds.). Mammal Species of the World: A Taxonomic and Geographic Reference (3rd ed.). Johns Hopkins University Press. p. 501. ISBN 978-0-8018-8221-0. OCLC 62265494.
- Skiba, R. 2003. Europäische Fledermäuse. Die Neue Brehm-Bücherei 648. Hohenwarsleben: Westarp Wissenschaften, 212 pp. (in German). ISBN 3-89432-907-6
- Spitzenberger, F., Pavlinić, I. and Podnar, M. 2008. On the occurrence of Myotis alcathoe von Helversen and Heller, 2001 in Austria. Hystrix Italian Journal of Mammalogy (n.s.) 19(1):3–12.
- Stadelmann, B., Jacobs, D.S., Schoeman, C. and Ruedi, M. 2004. Phylogeny of African Myotis bats (Chiroptera, Vespertilionidae) inferred from cytochrome b sequences. Acta Chiropterologica 6(2):177–192.
- Sümer, N. and Yıldırımhan, H.S. 2019. Intestinal helminth parasites of two bat species of the genus 'Myotis' Kaup, 1829 (Chiroptera: Vespertilionidae) from Turkey, with DNA sequencing of helminth nuclear LSR rDNA. Acta Zoologica Bulgarica 71(2):273-278.
- Szentiványi, T., Estók, P. and Földvári, M. 2016. Checklist of host associations of European bat flies (Diptera: Nycteribiidae, Streblidae) (subscription required). Zootaxa 4205(2):101-126.
- Voigt, C.C., Heller, K.-G., Holderied, M., Mayer, F., Tschapka, M., Volleth, M. and Winter, Y. 2009. An inquisitive mind: Prof. Dr. Otto Freiherr von Helversen-Helversheim (1943–2009) (subscription required). Acta Chiropterologica 11(2):467–469.
- Zagorodniuk, I. and Dykyy, I. 2009. Brandt's bat (Myotis brandtii) in the western Ukraine: Identification, distribution, ecomorphology. Visnyk of Lviv University, Biological Series 49:111–127 (in Ukrainian).
