= Pipistrellus creticus =

Scientific classification
- Kingdom: Animalia
- Phylum: Chordata
- Class: Mammalia
- Order: Chiroptera
- Family: Vespertilionidae
- Genus: Pipistrellus
- Species: P. creticus

Binomial name
- Pipistrellus creticus Benda, 2009

Synonyms
- Pipistrellus hanaki creticus Benda, 2009

Species of bat

Pipistrellus creticus is a species of vesper bat. Thought initially described as a subspecies of Pipistrellus hanaki in 2009, further study found that it differed enough genetically and physically to be considered a separate species. The holotype was collected in Crete, from which the species name creticus is derived.
