= Makhtumkala =

Village in Turkmenistan

Makhtumkala or Magtymgala is a riverside village in Turkmenistan.

== Site ==
At the western perimeter of the village is the Mausoleum of Makhtum — a rectangular structure (c. 14th-15th century) with a tin-domed roof and an entrance, flanked with niches. It remains inaccessible to tourists.

About 14 km east of the village, a trek leads to the Kozhdemir (var. Gochedmir) Waterfalls (38.45532°N 56.54336°E).

== Wildlife ==
Snow leopards were spotted in 1970. Common noctules are seen.
