= European Bat Night =

The European Bat Night is a popular, annual event to draw public awareness to threatened bat populations in Europe. It is hosted by local nature conservation organisations and attracts a number of ecologically interested people, families, and children. Depending on the local contributors, there are species exhibitions, presentations, workshops for constructing bat houses, and bat walks at night time.

== History ==
The first European Bat Nights were arranged in the 1990s in Poland and France. Since 1997 the Bat Night is organised under the auspices of the Agreement on the Conservation of Populations of European Bats (EUROBATS). Today the event takes place in several cities and regions in more than 30 countries throughout Europe. It is traditionally held on the last weekend of August, but the definite choice of the date is left to the organisers.

== Aim of the event ==
Bat conservation requires effective publicity as well as the cooperation of private persons, because bats often breed and hibernate in houses, churches and other buildings used by people. The European Bat Night aims to break down the barriers between humans and bats by passing on information about the way bats live and their needs.

== See also ==
- Bat
- EUROBATS
- The Bat Conservation Trust
- Bat Conservation International
