= Myotis hyrcanicus =

Scientific classification
- Kingdom: Animalia
- Phylum: Chordata
- Class: Mammalia
- Order: Chiroptera
- Family: Vespertilionidae
- Genus: Myotis
- Species: M. hyrcanicus

Binomial name
- Myotis hyrcanicus Benda, Reiter & Vallo, 2012

Iranian bat in the family Vespertilionidae

Myotis hyrcanicus is a bat in the genus Myotis known only from northeastern Iran.

The species was named in 2012 by a team led by Czech biologist Petr Benda. The description was based on a single specimen collected in 2006. Based on mitochondrial DNA evidence, it is most closely related to Myotis alcathoe from Europe, but the two differ by at least 9.5% in their sequences, indicating that they are different species.

The only known specimen was collected in an alluvial forest at Kordabad in Iran's northeastern Golestan province. However, Iran's mammal fauna is not well known, and the true range of the species is likely to extend further west in the Hyrcanian forests ecoregion, perhaps even into Azerbaijan.

It is a small species, with a forearm length of 32.4 millimetres (1.28 in) and ear length of 14.2 millimetres (0.56 in). The fur is brownish, with gray-brown face, ears and wings. It is similar to Myotis alcathoe, but with a relatively longer rostrum (front part of the skull) and larger teeth. It shares a relatively narrow skull with Myotis alcathoe circassicus, the Caucasian subspecies of M. alcathoe. However, the last upper premolar is relatively large in M. hyrcanicus and small in M. alcathoe circassicus.
