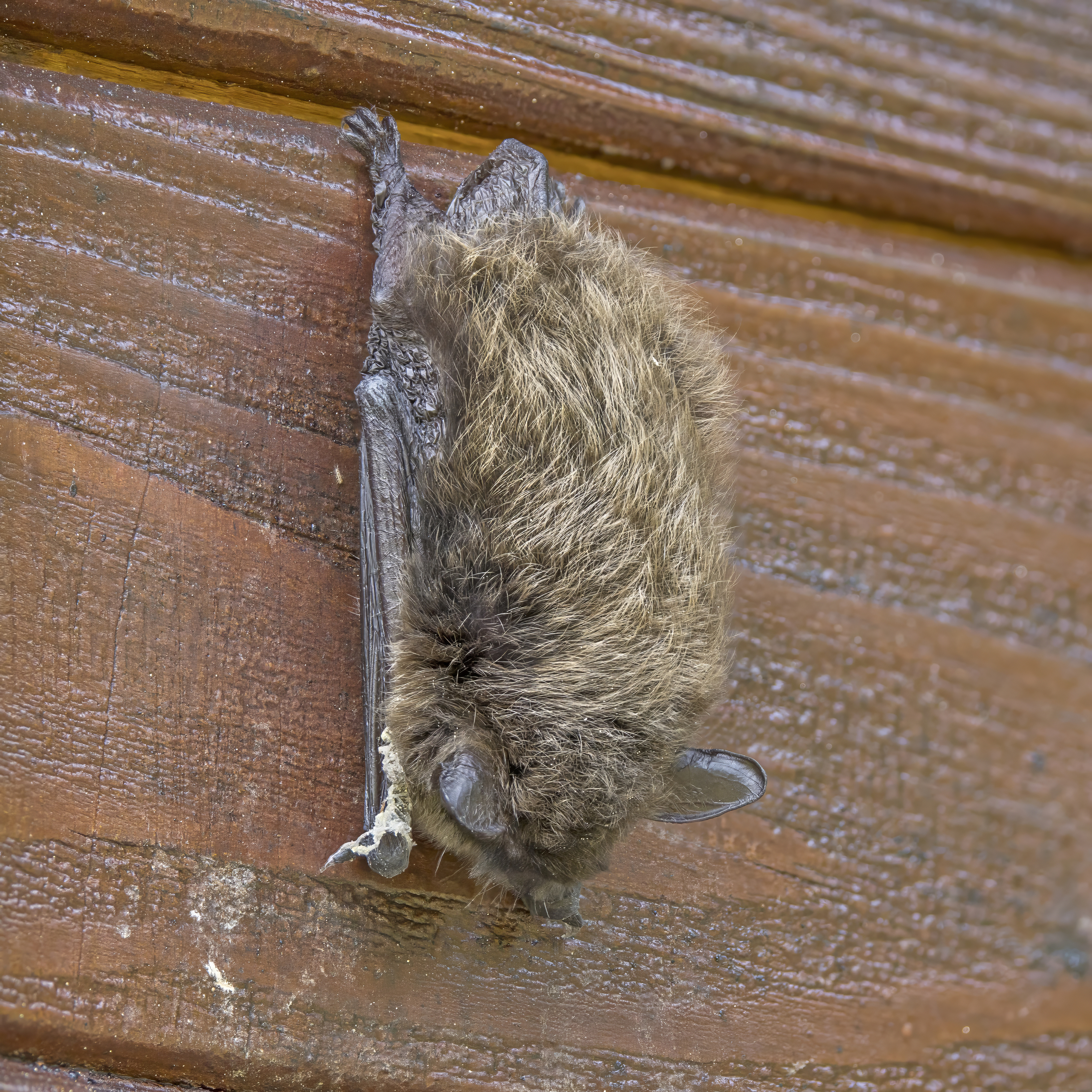
- in Slovakia

Conservation status
- Least Concern (IUCN 3.1)

Scientific classification
- Kingdom: Animalia
- Phylum: Chordata
- Class: Mammalia
- Order: Chiroptera
- Family: Vespertilionidae
- Genus: Myotis
- Species: M. mystacinus

Binomial name
- Myotis mystacinus (Kuhl, 1817)
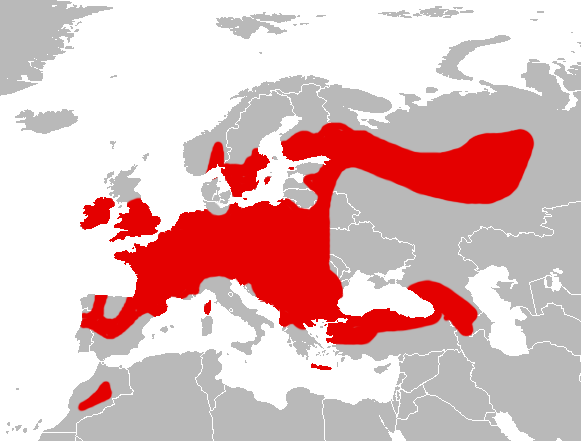

= Whiskered bat =

Species of bat

The whiskered bat (Myotis mystacinus) is a small European bat with long fur. Although uncommon, M. mystacinus is often found around human habitation and around water; it is similar to Brandt's bat (Myotis brandtii), from which it was distinguished as a separate species only in 1970.

== Taxonomy ==
The taxonomy of the genus Myotis is "considered to be one of the most challenging topics in European bat systematics", and the species count within the genus and the M. mystacinus group has varied considerably over the years. The analysis of morphological, behavioural, and especially genetic characters have since identified further cryptic species of whiskered bats in the genus Myotis, including Myotis alcathoe (described in 2001 from Europe). Myotis aurascens and Myotis ikonnikovi are other similar species. Myotis hajastanicus was also included in M. mystacinus until recently, but it was differentiated on the base of morphological comparison.

As of 2016, three subspecies are accepted:

- M. m. mystacinus, found over most of its range,
- M. m. occidentalis, found in Iberia and Morocco,
- M. m. caucasicus, found in the Caucasus.

== Description ==
It is a small bat, 3.5-4.8 cm long and with a wingspan of 21-24 cm, and weighing 4-8 g. It has long fur that varies in colour from dark brown to golden on the back and greyish on the front.

The frequencies used by M. mystacinus for echolocation are 34–102 kHz, have most energy at 53 kHz, and have an average duration of 3.0 ms.

== Range, habitat and ecology ==
The whiskered bat is a primarily European species, found over large parts of mainland Europe, the United Kingdom, and extending into the Urals. It has also been found in Morocco in northern Africa. It can be found over a wide variety of habitats, including forest, meadows, and semi-desert. It is often found living in urban areas.

It is an insectivore.

== Conservation status ==
The whiskered bat is assessed as a species of least concern by the IUCN due to its wide distribution and lack of significant threats. It is among the most common bat species within its range in Europe.
