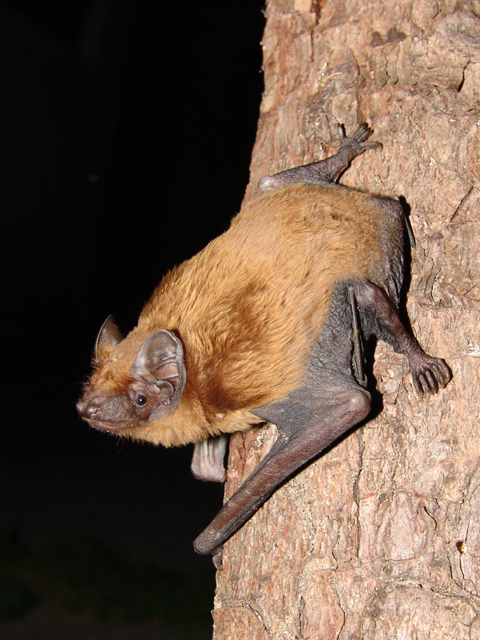

Conservation status
- Least Concern (IUCN 3.1)

Scientific classification
- Kingdom: Animalia
- Phylum: Chordata
- Class: Mammalia
- Order: Chiroptera
- Family: Vespertilionidae
- Genus: Nyctalus
- Species: N. noctula

Binomial name
- Nyctalus noctula (Schreber, 1774)
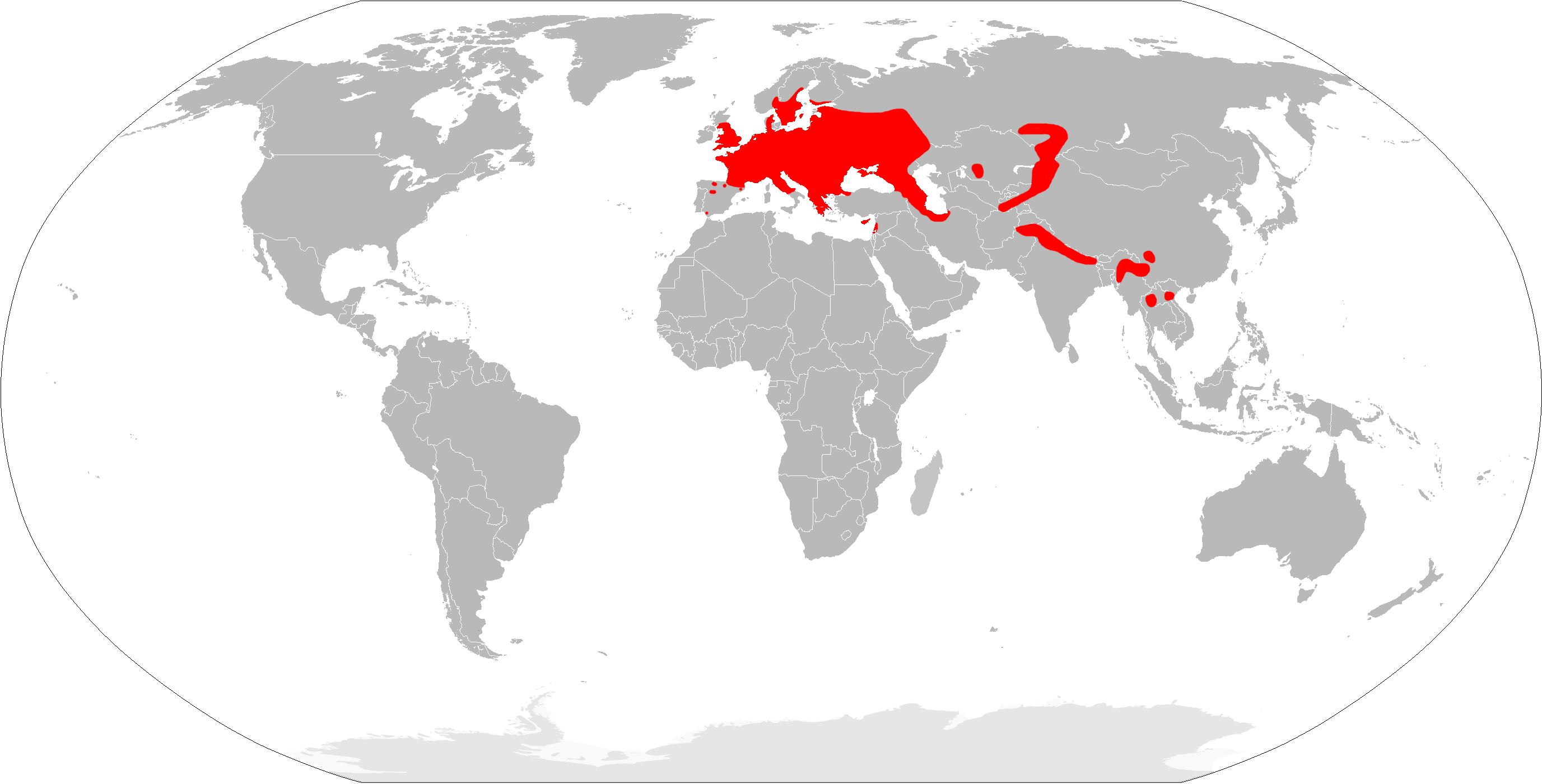
- Distribution of the common noctule

= Common noctule =

Species of bat

The common noctule (Nyctalus noctula) is a species of insectivorous bat common throughout Europe, Asia, and North Africa.

== Description ==
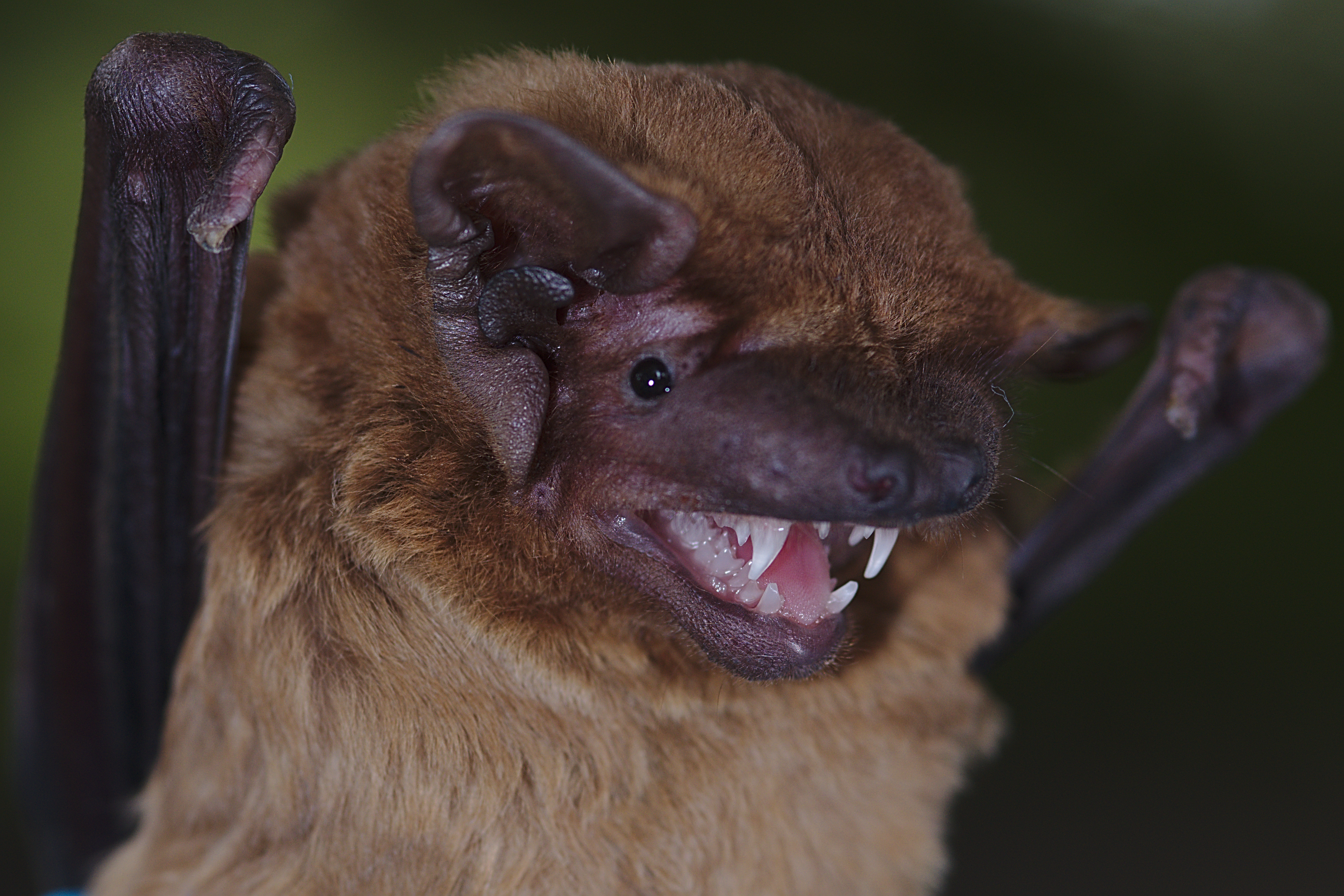
A common noctule

The common noctule's short fur is dark brown after moulting in June (males) or July/August (females); later it changes to red-brown before the onset of winter. When awake, the body temperature is 36.5 °C (97.7 °F) but it decreases significantly during inactivity. The body mass of adult common noctule is 25–30 g (0.88–1.1 oz) and they have a wingspan of 37–40 cm (15–16 in). The species forages with a rapid flying speed of 20–40 km/h (12–25 mph), sometimes up to 60 km/h (37 mph). Because of temporally limited availability of insect prey, they have short daily activity periods before sunrise and after sunset of in total one hour or less and so must cope with up to twenty-three hours of fasting a day. Characterised by its robust body and long, broad wings, it also has a distinctive, pointed snout and large ears that are essential for its echolocation capabilities.

== Distribution and habitat ==
Most parts of Europe, central Russia, across the Ural mountain, Caucasus, Turkey, the Near East, to southwestern parts of Siberia, the Himalayas, China, Malaysia, Taiwan and Japan. In Bulgaria, it is widespread and prefers deciduous forests. It commonly roosts in tree cavities and buildings, particularly in attics. The species has adapted well to urban environments, using street lights that attract insects. Its range extends from the western parts of Europe to the eastern regions, including countries like Germany, Poland, and the United Kingdom. The common noctule is usually found at altitudes up to 2,000 metres, with recorded populations in a variety of habitats, from deciduous forests to agricultural landscapes. The common noctule prefers small to medium-sized woodlands, but also forages up to 20 km (12 mi) away from the woodland at night. When roosting by day, it usually seeks out tree holes or even bat boxes attached to tree trunks. Generally, the common noctule lives in wooded habitats, but some populations thrive in towns such as Hamburg, Vienna, Brno and some other central European cities.

== Biology ==
=== Reproduction and migration ===
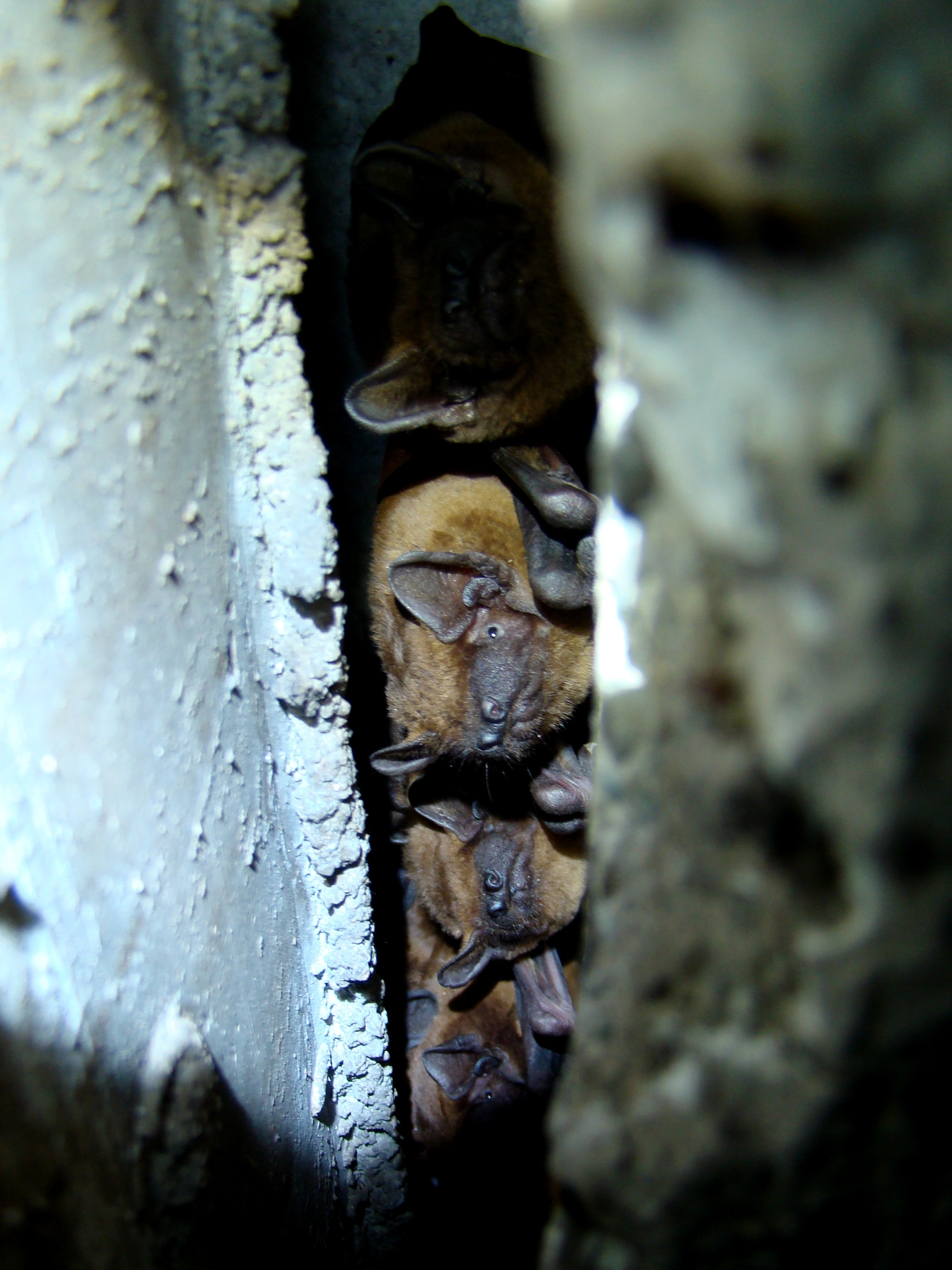
Common noctules roosting in the crevice of a building.

The common noctule is a migrating species with female bias, meaning that the females migrate but the males do not. Mating season is in late summer in the wintering areas, and the females store the sperm in the uterus during hibernation until fertilisation in spring. During early pregnancy in late April the females migrate north, as far as the Baltic region, to return to their natal maternity colonies and give birth after being pregnant for six to eight weeks. Each female rears one or two young per year. At birth the offspring is about a third of the maternal body weight, and after three to four weeks of suckling the young leave the roost almost fully developed – so the female rears the offspring to full size entirely on milk. Male common noctules do not migrate, but scatter along the females' migration routes to have higher chances of attracting the first females migrating back to the wintering regions. The reproductive cycle of male bats seems to correspond directly to season and food availability and spermatogenesis can be affected by body condition. In early autumn, males develop large testes and aim to attract females with singing calls. While in the harem roosts, males often do not enter torpor, but stay awake and mobile to defend the females from other males trying to copulate. Another reason for the avoidance of torpor during late summer and early autumn can be that spermatogenesis in bats can be delayed when resting metabolic rate is depressed, i.e. during torpor and hibernation. During the summer, male noctules are solitary or form small bachelor groups. In Europe, the young are reared mainly in the northern parts of the distribution area, north of roughly 48°–49°N latitude. With the exception of the main breeding area, several smaller and isolated breeding areas are known – recorded in Slovakia, Hungary, Bulgaria, Slovenia, Iberian Peninsula and Italy.

=== Hibernation ===
Common noctule bats hibernate in winter, and sometimes congregate in hibernation colonies of up to 1000 individuals. In late summer the adult females migrate back southwards to the wintering areas, the young following later. Hibernation at these latitudes is thought to avoid too many days in winter below 0 °C (32 °F). At the beginning of winter, usually in November (but this is strongly dependent on the ambient temperatures), N noctula start to hibernate in large groups with both sexes in the same roost. Tree holes are not warm enough so they use caves, objects like church steeples or blocks of flats in Eastern Europe, where they are most common hibernating bat species in the cities. Sometimes summer territories and hibernating places are hundreds of kilometres apart.

=== Diet and Echolocation ===
When hunting, it often starts flying in early dusk, earlier than most European bats. It flies high above the forested areas that are its preferred habitat, reaching speeds of up to 50 km/h (31 mph).

Common noctule bats mainly eat beetles, moths and winged ants. It is known for its high-flying foraging technique, often hunting at altitudes of up to 1,000 metres. Nyctalus noctula uses echolocation to detect prey, emitting high-frequency calls that help it navigate and locate food in the dark. Its foraging strategy is particularly effective in open areas where it can cover large distances in search of insects. The species plays a crucial role in controlling insect populations, making it an important part of the ecosystem. The common noctule uses two main calls for echolocation. The frequencies of the first are 26–47 kHz, have most energy at 27 kHz and an average duration of 11.5ms. The frequency of the second call is 22–33 kHz, having most energy at 22 kHz and an average duration of 13.8ms.

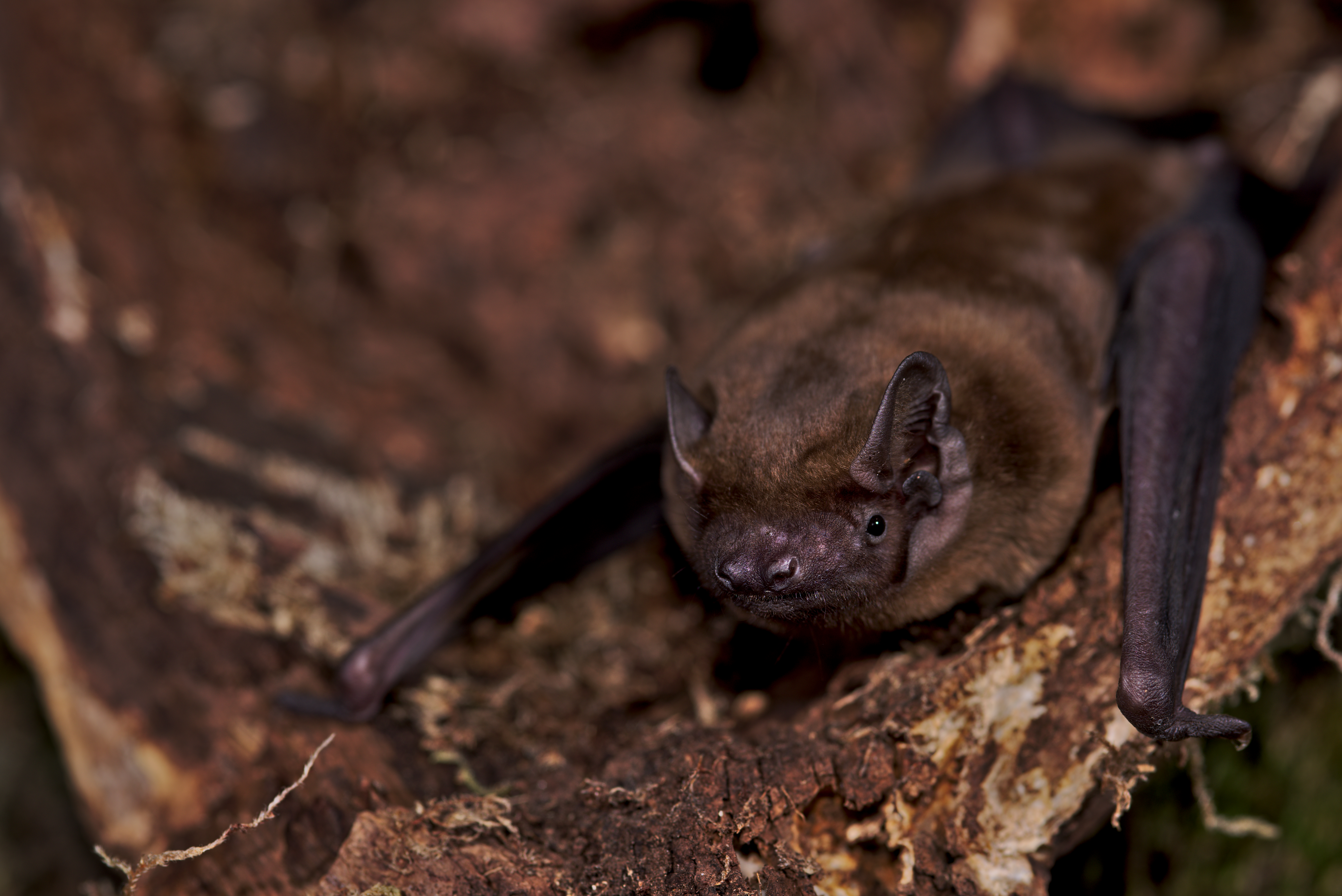
Common noctule in the Seeburgpark near Konstanz (Germany)

== Conservation ==
This species is protected in the European Union under the Habitats Directive. It is also listed in the Berne Convention and is specifically targeted by the UNEP-EUROBATS convention. Several national legislatures also protect this species and its habitats. In order to highlight the importance of protecting this species at the European scale, it was selected as "Bat species of the Year" 2016 and 2017 by the pan-European NGO BatLife Europe.

== See also ==
- Ricardo Meruane#Biography

== Literature cited ==
- Braun, M. and Dieterlen, F. 2003. Die Säugetiere Baden-Württembergs. Band 1: Allgemeiner Teil, Fledermäuse (Chiroptera): Verlag Eugen Ulmer, Stuttgart.
- Ceľuch, M.; Kaňuch, P. (2005). "Winter activity and roosts of the noctule (Nyctalus noctula) in an urban area (Central Slovakia)". Lynx (Praha). 36: 39–45.
- Dechmann, D. K.; Wikelski, M.; Varga, K.; Yohannes, E.; Fiedler, W.; Safi, K.; Burkhard, W.-D.; O'Mara, M. T. (2014). "Tracking post-hibernation behavior and early migration does not reveal the expected sex-differences in a "female-migrating" bat". PLOS ONE. 9 (12) e114810. Bibcode:2014PLoSO...9k4810D. doi:10.1371/journal.pone.0114810. PMC 4269398. PMID 25517947.
- Görföl, T.; Dombi, I.; Boldogh, S.; Estók, P. (2009). "Going further South: new data on the breeding of Nyctalus noctula (Schreber, 1774) in Central Europe" (PDF). Hystrix: The Italian Journal of Mammalogy.
- Kulzer, E (1967). "Die Herztätigkeit bei lethargischen und winterschlafenden Fledermäusen". Zeitschrift für vergleichende Physiologie. 56: 63–94. doi:10.1007/BF00333563.
- Kurta, A.; Johnson, K. A.; Kunz, T. H. (1987). "Oxygen consumption and body temperature of female little brown bats (Myotis lucifugus) under simulated roost conditions". Physiological Zoology. 60 (4): 386–397. doi:10.1086/physzool.60.4.30157900.
- Kurta, A.; Kunz, T. H. (1988). "Roosting metabolic rate and body temperature of male little brown bats (Myotis lucifugus) in summer". Journal of Mammalogy. 69 (3): 645–651. doi:10.2307/1381365. JSTOR 1381365.
- McNab, B. K. 1982. Evolutionary Alternatives in the Physiological Ecology of Bats. In Ecology of Bats, (ed. T. H. Kunz), pp. 151–200. Boston, MA: Springer US.
- Obrist, M.K.; Boesch, R.; Flückiger, P.F. (2004). "Variability in echolocation call design of 26 Swiss bat species: Consequences, limits and options for automated field identification with a synergic pattern recognition approach" (PDF). Mammalia. 68 (4): 307–32. doi:10.1515/mamm.2004.030.
- Parsons, S.; Jones, G. (2000). "Acoustic identification of twelve species of echolocating bat by discriminant function analysis and artificial neural networks". J Exp Biol. 203 (17): 2641–2656. Bibcode:2000JExpB.203.2641P. doi:10.1242/jeb.203.17.2641. PMID 10934005.
- Petit, E.; Mayer, F. (1999). "Male dispersal in the noctule bat (Nyctalus noctula): where are the limits?". Proceedings of the Royal Society of London B: Biological Sciences. 266 (1430): 1717–1722. doi:10.1098/rspb.1999.0837. PMC 1690204. PMID 10518319.
- Popa-Lisseanu, A. G.; Voigt, C. C. (2009). "Bats on the move". Journal of Mammalogy. 90 (6): 1283–1289. doi:10.1644/09-MAMM-S-130R2.1.
- Racey, P. 1982. Ecology of bat reproduction. In Ecology of bats, pp. 57–104: Springer.
- Schober, W. and Grimmberger, E. 1989. A guide to bats of Britain and Europe. Hamlyn.
- Speakman, J.; Racey, P. (1986). "The influence of body condition on sexual development of male brown long-eared bats (Plecotus auritus) in the wild". Journal of Zoology. 210 (4): 515–525. doi:10.1111/j.1469-7998.1986.tb03653.x.
- Strelkov, P.P. (1997). "Breeding area and its position in range of migratory bats species (Chiroptera, Vespertilionidae) in East Europe and adjacent territories. Communication 1". Zool. Zhurnal. 76: 1073–1082.
