= Pipistrellus hanaki =

Conservation status
- Vulnerable (IUCN 3.1)

Scientific classification
- Kingdom: Animalia
- Phylum: Chordata
- Class: Mammalia
- Order: Chiroptera
- Family: Vespertilionidae
- Genus: Pipistrellus
- Species: P. hanaki

Binomial name
- Pipistrellus hanaki Hulva & Benda, 2004

Species of bat

Hanak's dwarf bat or Hanak's pipistrelle (Pipistrellus hanaki) is a species of bat only found in Cyrenaica, Libya and Crete, Greece.

== Taxonomy ==
Pipistrellus hanaki was described as a new species in 2004. Its description was the result of a taxonomic split of the common pipistrelle. The holotype was collected in Cyrenaica, which is in eastern Libya. The eponym for the species name "hanaki" is Czech Republic scientist Vladimír Hanák, for his significant contribution "to the knowledge of the Palaearctic bat fauna". Hanák was also the first to point out the difference of this taxon from other members of the common pipistrelle species complex.

== Range and habitat ==
In Crete, Hanak's dwarf bat was recorded in mosaics of oak trees (mainly Quercus pubescens), cypresses (Cupressus sempervirens), olive trees (Olea europea), carob trees (Ceratonia siliqua) and to a lesser extend other cultivated trees (including Ficus carica and Prunus spp.).

== Echolocation ==
This species uses the same range of frequencies as the common pipistrelle, but its specific social calls allow a clear separation from the other pipistrelle species.

== Conservation ==
This species is protected in the European Union under the Habitats Directive, Annex IV. This species is also listed in the Berne Convention and is specifically targeted by the UNEP-EUROBATS convention.
