= David's myotis =

Conservation status
- Least Concern (IUCN 3.1)

Scientific classification
- Kingdom: Animalia
- Phylum: Chordata
- Class: Mammalia
- Order: Chiroptera
- Family: Vespertilionidae
- Genus: Myotis
- Species: M. davidii

Binomial name
- Myotis davidii Peters, 1869
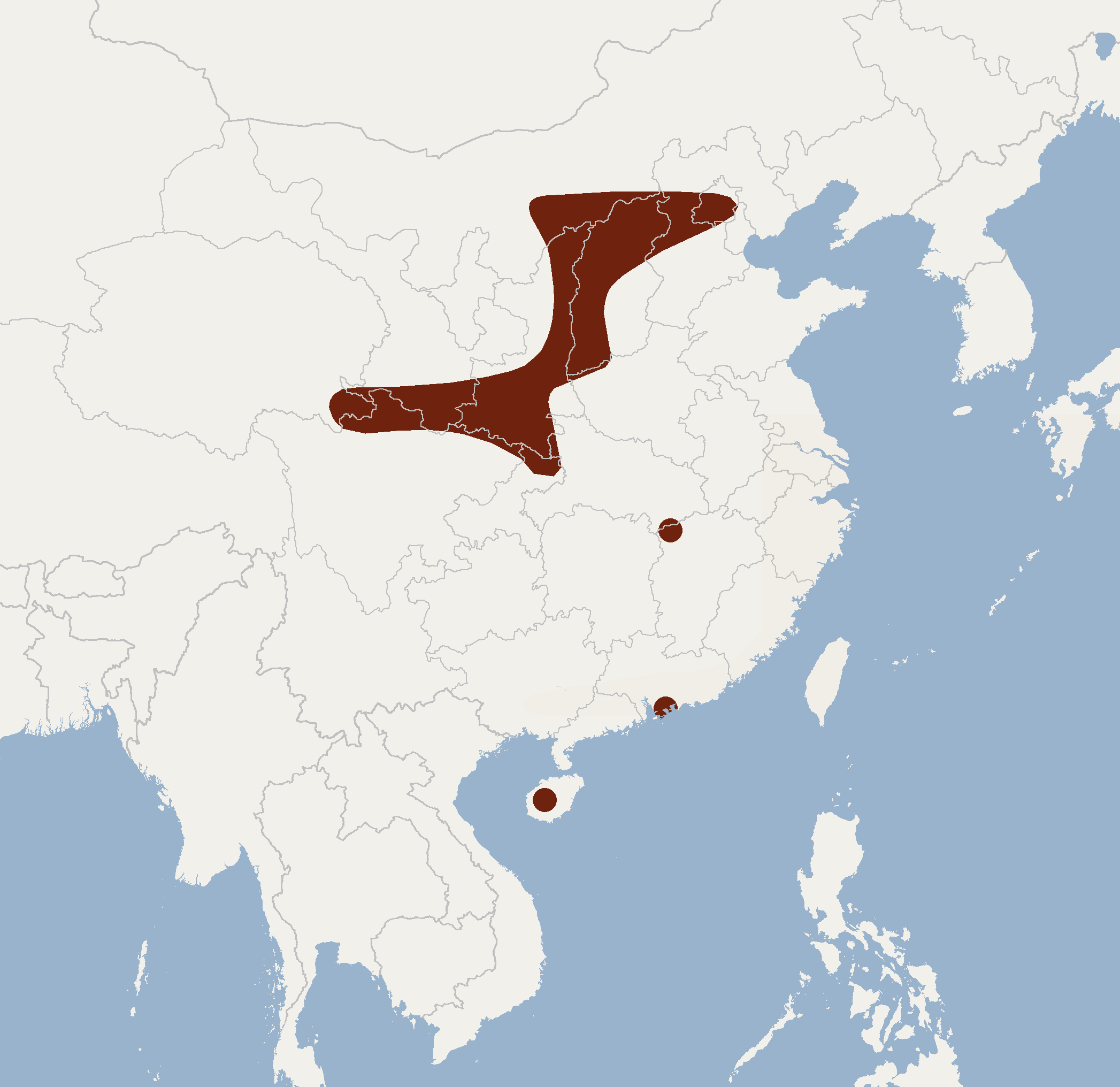

Species of bat

David's myotis (Myotis davidii) is a species of microbat in the Vespertilionidae family native to China, Mongolia, Kazakhstan, and Russia. First identified in 1869 by Wilhelm Peters, it is similar in morphology to species like M. mystacinus, M. ikonnikovi, M. brandtii, and M. sibiricus. It was previously considered to be a subspecies of the whiskered bat (Myotis mystacinus).

== Description ==
Myotis davidii are microbats with a forearm length of < 36 mm. Their wing membrane is inserted at the base of the outer toe. Their spur length is no more than half the length of the margin of the tail membrane and there are no terminal lobes or breaks present. The posterior margin of the ear has a distinct indentation. Hair with dark bases and lighter tips, frequently with golden gloss. Upper second premolar is rather small (maximum 1/2 of the size of the first upper premolar) and sometimes displaced palatally of the tooth row. Singular cusp of the third upper premolar is small or absent, always lower than the second upper premolar. Ears are brown, inside of the ear and the base of the tragus lighter brown, sometimes even pinkish. Nostril is often heart-shaped, lateral part is usually well-developed. Adult individuals are always without yellowish-brown hair on the sides of the neck, therefore the ventral and dorsal colors of the fur are sharply divided.

== Range and habitat ==
David's myotis is endemic to China where it is found in the provinces of Hebei, Hubei, Inner Mongolia, Shaanxi, Shanxi and Hong Kong. More recently it has been found farther north in Siberia and the Southern Urals. The most northern siting was at 53°28′45″N, 58°39′35″E, in Bashkortostan, Russia.

== Conservation ==
Myotis davidii is categorized as being of least concern by the IUCN, although the range shown in the IUCN report does not include the locations of more recent sightings farther west and north, in the southern Urals.
