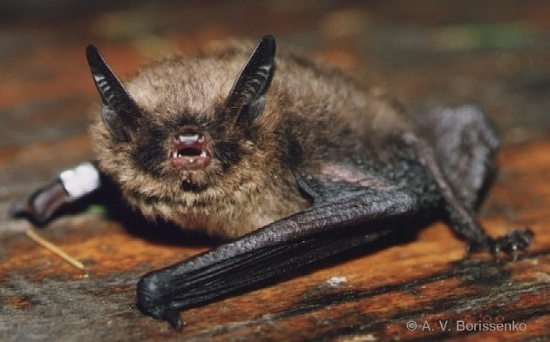

Conservation status
- Least Concern (IUCN 3.1)

Scientific classification
- Kingdom: Animalia
- Phylum: Chordata
- Class: Mammalia
- Order: Chiroptera
- Family: Vespertilionidae
- Genus: Myotis
- Species: M. brandtii

Binomial name
- Myotis brandtii (Eversmann, 1845)
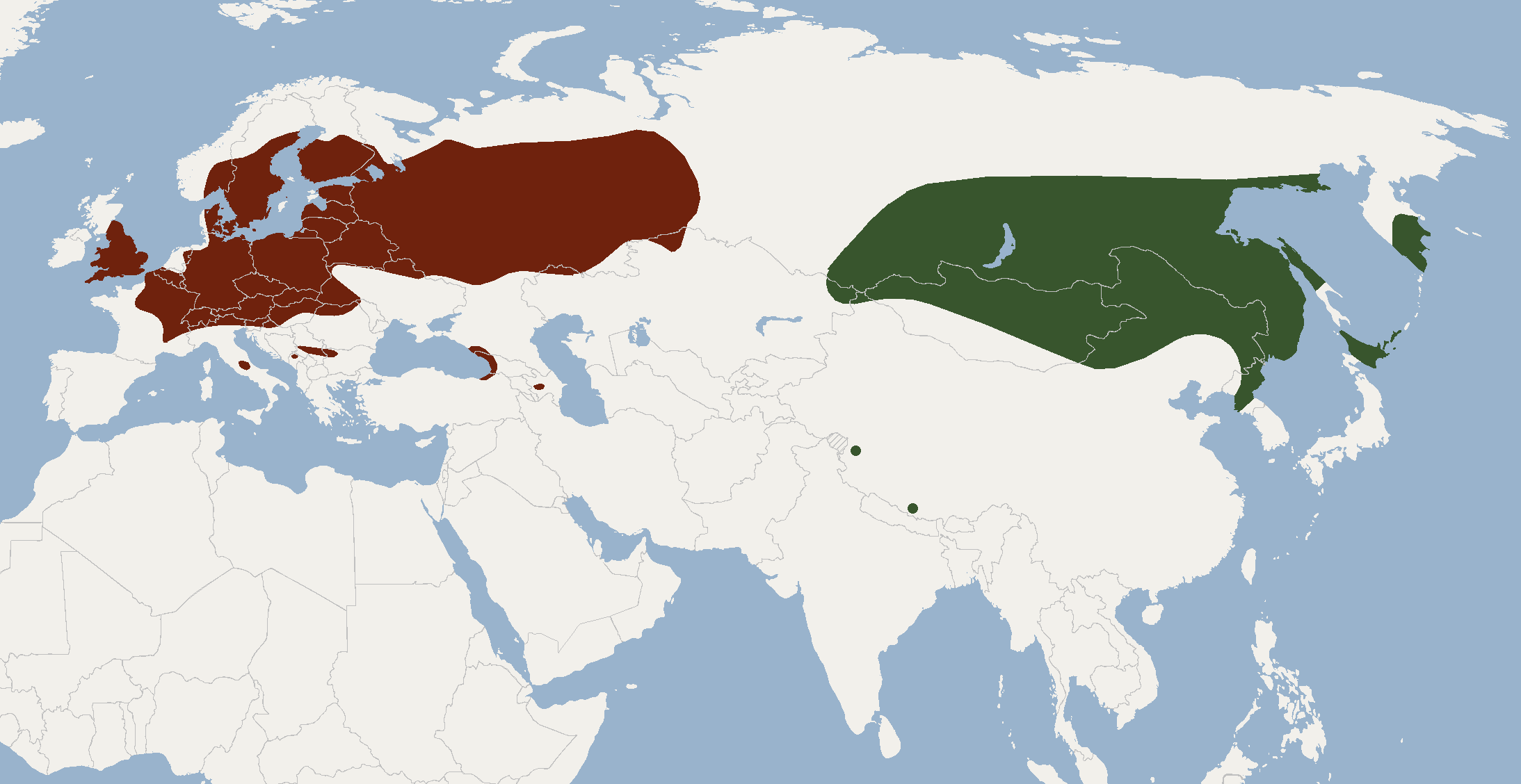
- Myotis brandtii range in red

Synonyms
- Vespertilio brandtii Eversmann, 1845; Myotis mystacinus brandtii

= Brandt's bat =

Species of bat

Brandt's bat or Brandt's myotis (Myotis brandtii) is a species of vesper bat in the family Vespertilionidae. It is native to most of Europe and parts of western Asia.

== Taxonomy and etymology ==
The species was described in 1845 by German zoologist Eduard Friedrich Eversmann, who placed it the genus Vespertilio. For a time, the Brandt's bat was considered a subspecies of the whiskered bat Myotis mystacinus. In 1958, one author proposed that the two might be separate species, based on baculum differences; this idea gained traction in papers authored in 1970 and 1971. It is named after the German zoologist Johann Friedrich von Brandt.

Formerly, populations in central and eastern Asia were classified in this species. However, more recent studies indicate that they form a distinct species, the Siberian bat (Myotis sibiricus).

== Range and habitat ==
It is found throughout Europe and western Asia, including Great Britain, Western Europe, Central Europe, Fennoscandia, and western Russia. In the Balkans it is limited to the mountains. In 2010, Brandt's bat was documented in Ireland for the first time. Throughout its range, it has been documented from sea level up to 1,800 m (6,000 ft) altitude. It can be found in deciduous forests, or forests that are a mix of deciduous and coniferous trees. It is often found in close proximity to water.

== Description ==
Brandt's bat is 3.8–5.0 cm long, with a wingspan of 21–24 cm, and a weight of 4.5–9.5 g. It has dark grey or brown fur that is greyish underneath with golden tips. The face and the tips of ears are pinkish in colour.

== Biology ==
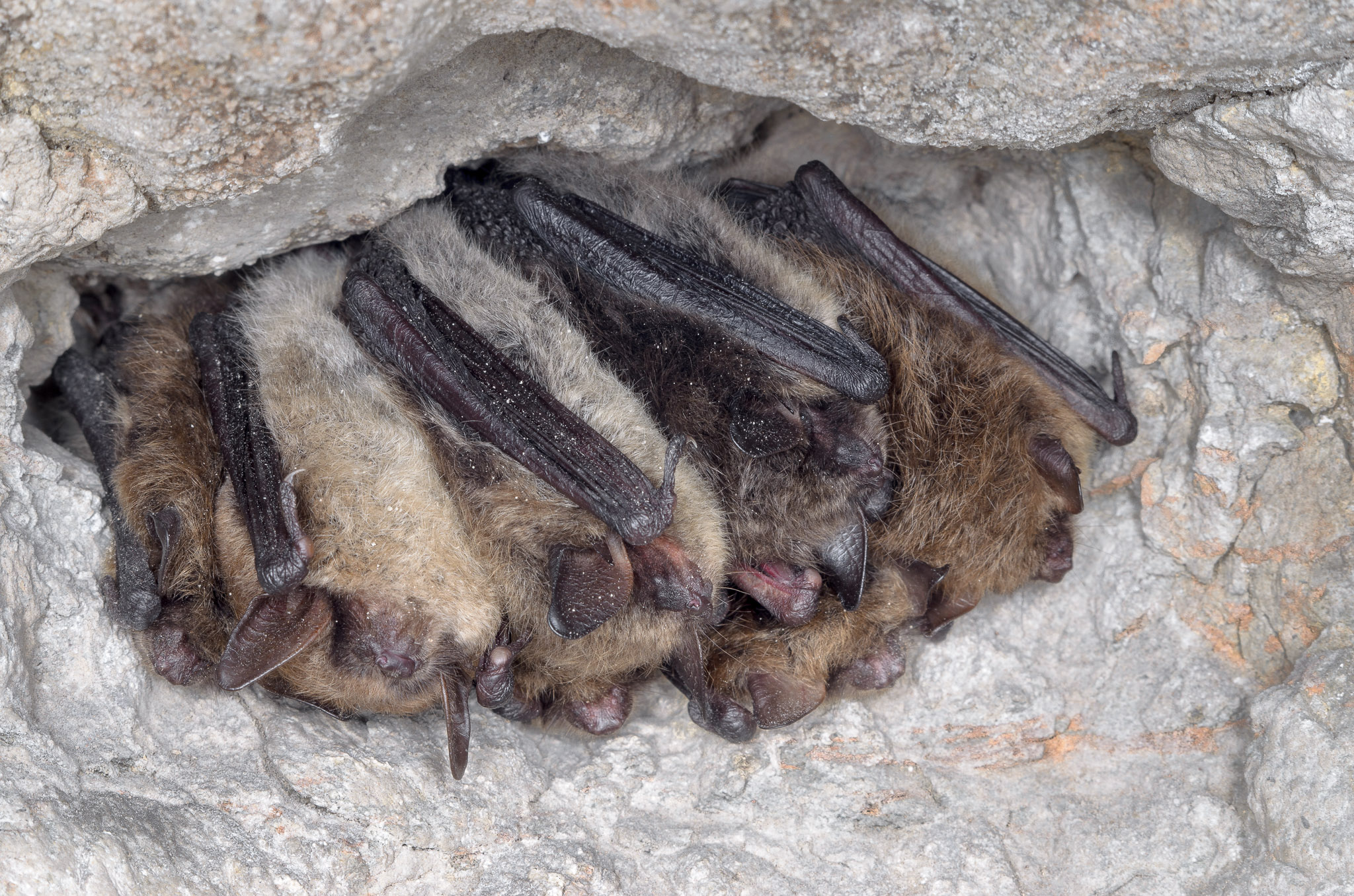
Brandt's bats roosting in Estonia

Like other bats and also primates, Brandt's bat has lost the ability to synthesize vitamin C.

=== Reproduction ===
During the summer, females will form maternity colonies to raise their young. The litter size is one pup. Pups are born in early summer, with pups becoming volant around one month of age. Maternity colonies have also been found in tree cavities and in bat houses. Some females reach sexual maturity at three months of age, but most do not breed until after reaching a year of age. Mating occurs in the fall, but females store the sperm until the spring, which is when fertilisation occurs.

=== Longevity ===
Brandt's bats had previously been reported to have very long lifespans nearing 40 years, but the populations studied have since been reclassified into a different species, the Siberian bat (Myotis sibiricus). Individuals of Brandt's bat do not have as long life expectancies as the Siberian bat. Individuals of Brandt's bat near Saint Petersburg live approximately 8.5 years; those in the Baltic region do not live longer than 18.5 years. However, researchers have also identified molecular evidence for long lifespans in true Brandt's bats, including changes in growth hormone receptors and insulin-like growth factor 1 receptors that likely contribute to a long life expectancy. By roosting in caves, it is able to avoid extreme weather conditions and predators, increasing its chances of living a long life. It also hibernates in winter, which is linked to longer life expectancies in bats.

=== Senses ===
Like other echolocating bats that use echolocation to detect prey instead of other senses, it has a reduction in the number of genes responsible for the sense of smell. Its eyes are small and adapted to vision in low-light levels. They are likely totally or partially colour-blind, and likely unable to see clearly in bright daylight. The frequencies used by this bat species for echolocation lie between 32 and 103 kHz, have maximum energy density at 51 kHz and have an average duration of 4.2 ms.

== Conservation ==
It is currently evaluated as least concern by the IUCN. It meets the criteria for this designation because it is an abundant, widespread species, with no indication of a decline in its population. Like all bat species in Europe, the Brandt's bat is a European Protected Species, meaning that it is illegal to deliberately capture, kill, injure, or disturb individuals; in addition, their roosts are protected as "breeding or resting" places.
