= Ikonnikov's bat =

Conservation status
- Least Concern (IUCN 3.1)

Scientific classification
- Kingdom: Animalia
- Phylum: Chordata
- Class: Mammalia
- Order: Chiroptera
- Family: Vespertilionidae
- Genus: Myotis
- Species: M. ikonnikovi

Binomial name
- Myotis ikonnikovi Ognev, 1912
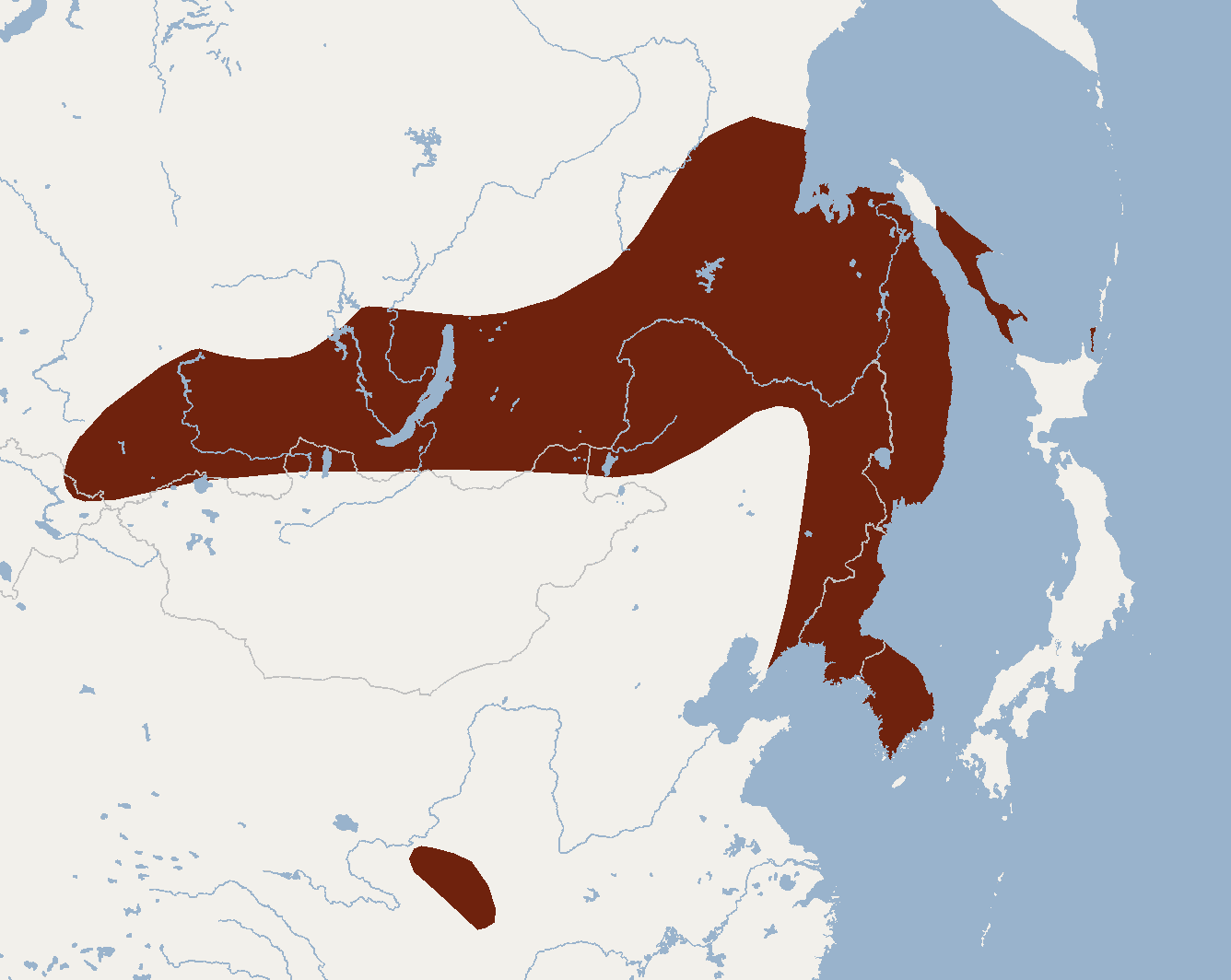

Synonyms
- Myotis fujiensis (Imaizumi, 1954); Myotis hosonoi (Imaizumi, 1954); Myotis ozensis (Imaizumi, 1954); Myotis yesoensis (Yoshiyuki, 1984)

Species of bat

Ikonnikov's bat (Myotis ikonnikovi) is a species of vesper bat. An adult Ikonnikov's bat has a body length of 4.2–5.1 cm, a tail of 3.1–4.0 cm, and a wing length of 3.3–3.6 cm. It is found in eastern Siberia, the Ussuri region, Sakhalin, Hokkaido and Honshu (Japan), and the Korean Peninsula.
