= List of mammals of peninsular Spain =

This list shows the IUCN Red List status of 115 mammal species occurring in Spanish territory in the Iberian Peninsula. Seven species are endangered, thirteen are vulnerable, and three are near threatened. If the IUCN Red List status of a species in Spain differs from its global status, the status in Spain is shown next between brackets.

Icons which state each species' global IUCN status:
EX	Extinct	No reasonable doubt that the last individual has died
CR	Critically Endangered	In imminent risk of extinction in the wild
EN	Endangered	Facing an extremely high risk of extinction in the wild
VU	Vulnerable	Facing a high risk of extinction in the wild
NT	Near Threatened	Doesn't meet any criteria that would categorise it as risking extinction but likely to in the future
LC	Least Concern	No current identifiable risks to this species
DD	Data Deficient	Inadequate information to make an assessment of the risks to this species

== Order: Rodentia (rodents) ==
Eurasian beavers

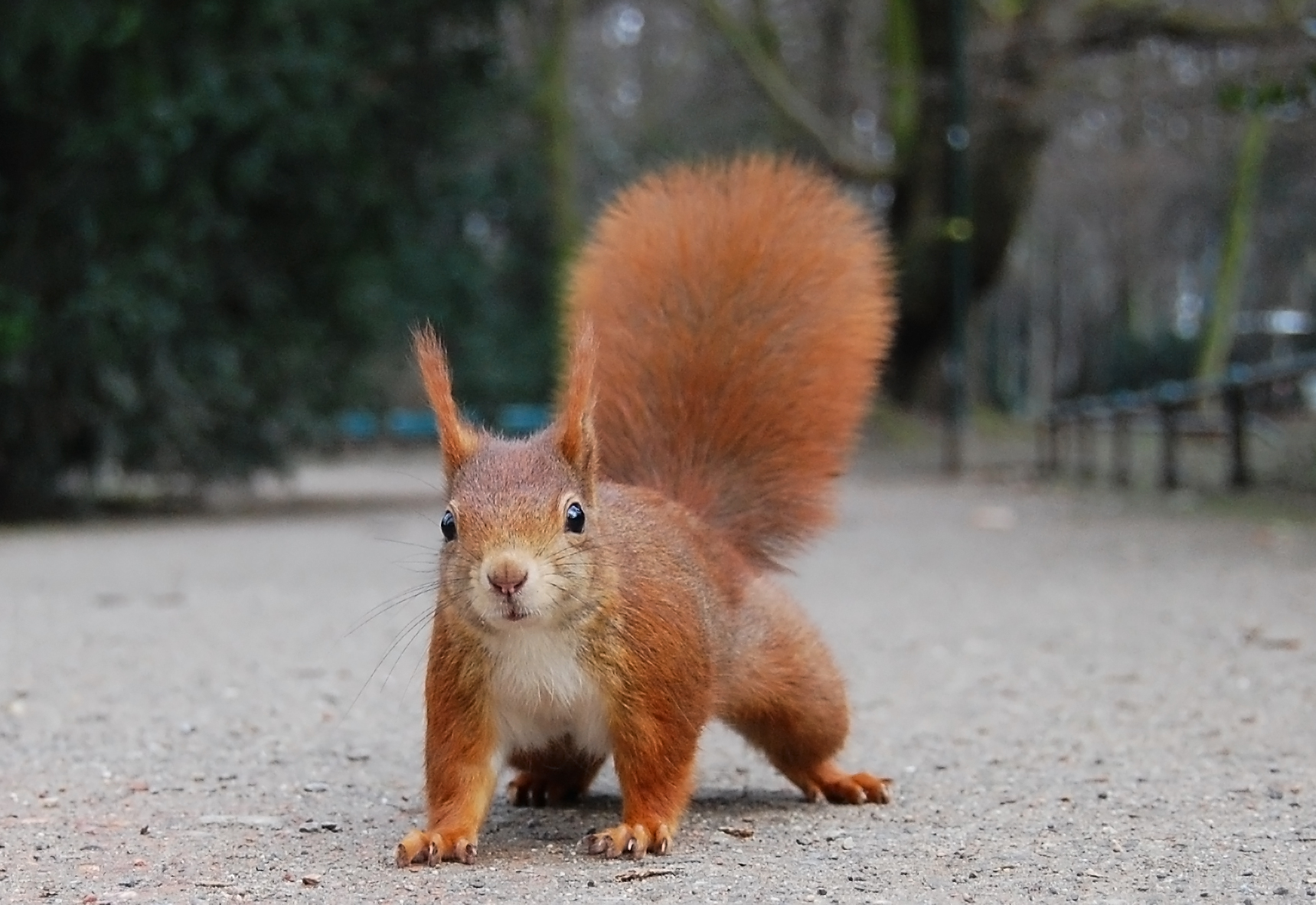
Red squirrel

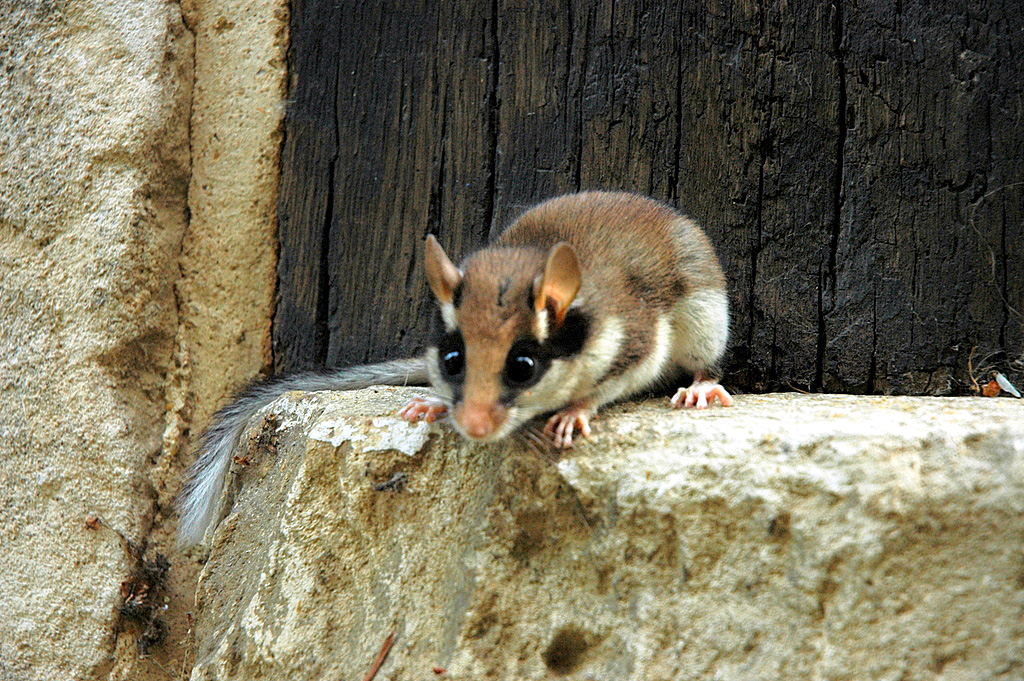
Garden dormouse

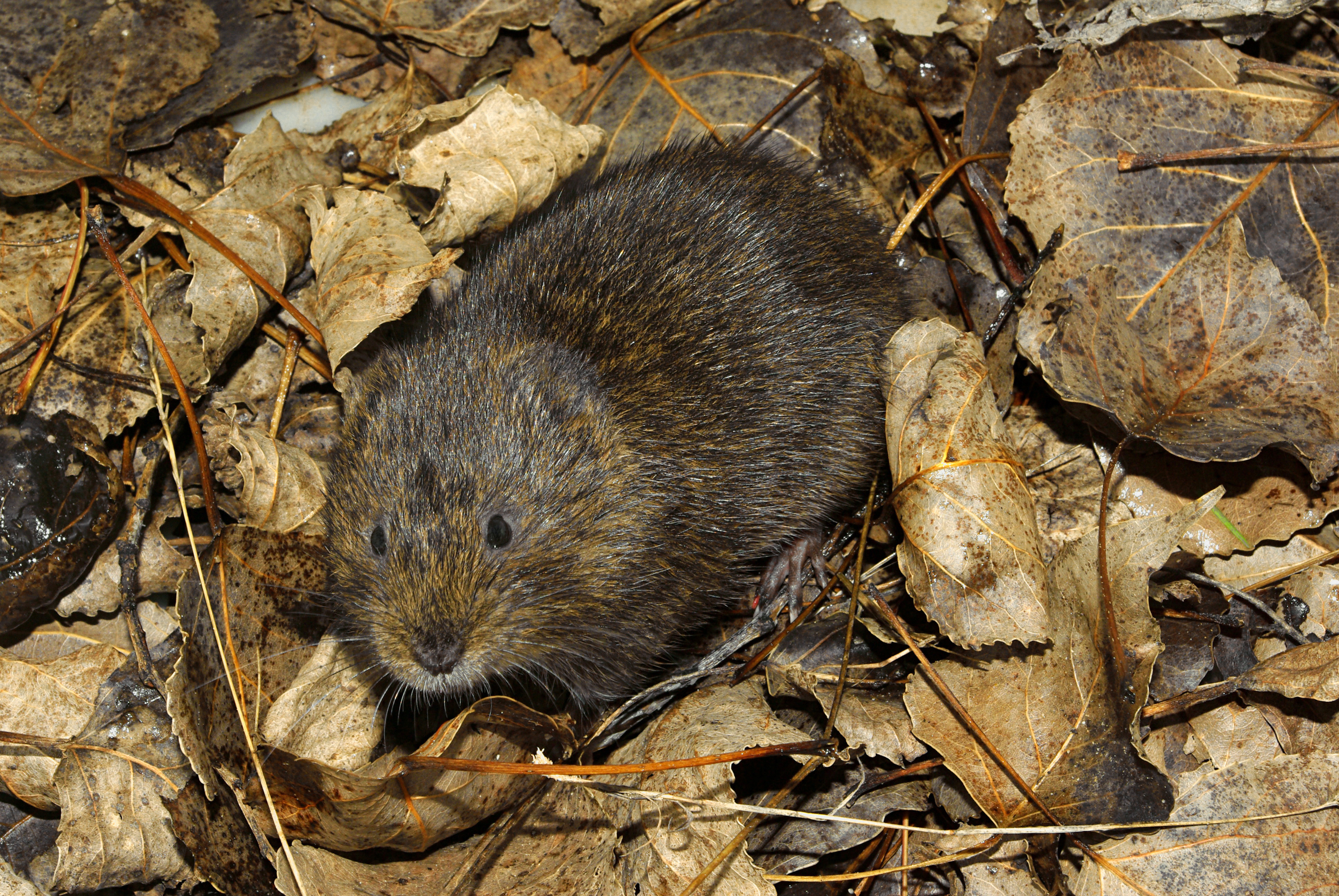
Southwestern water vole

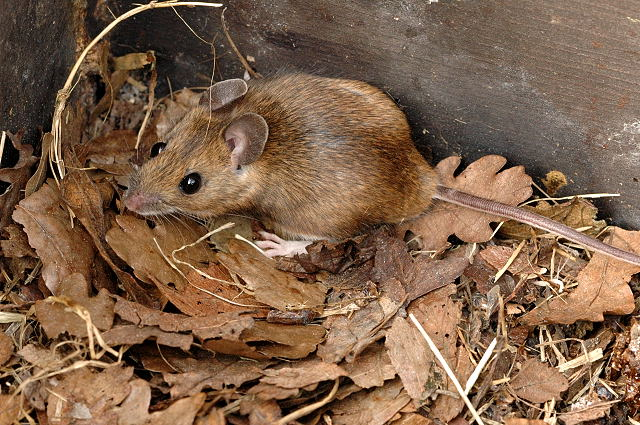
Yellow-necked mouse

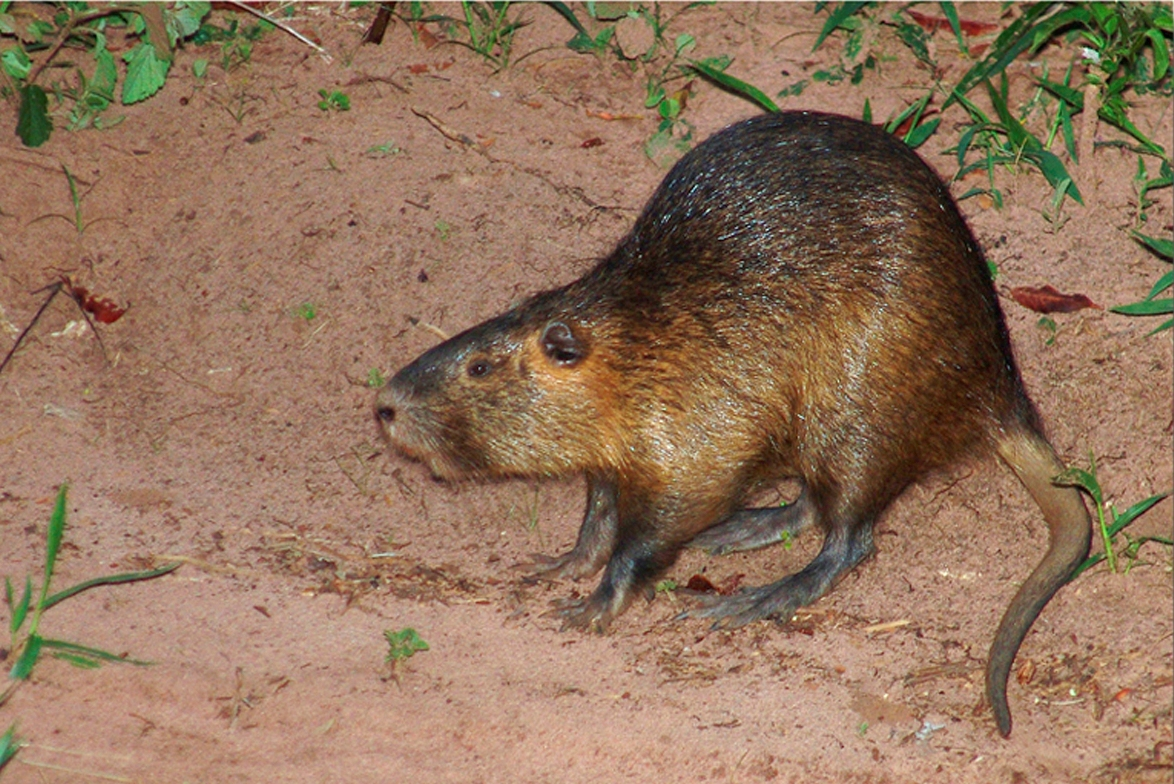
South American coypu, established in Navarre and Catalonia as a result of escapes from fur farms.

Rodents make up the largest order of mammals, with over 40% of mammalian species. They have two incisors in the upper and lower jaw which grow continually and must be kept short by gnawing. Most rodents are small though the capybara can weigh up to 45 kg (99 lb).

- Suborder: Castorimorpha
  - Family: Castoridae (beavers)
    - Subfamily: Castorinae
      - Tribe: Castorini
        - Genus: Castor
          - Eurasian beaver, C. fiber LC
- Suborder: Sciurognathi
  - Family: Sciuridae (squirrels)
    - Subfamily: Sciurinae
      - Tribe: Sciurini
        - Genus: Sciurus
          - Red squirrel, S. vulgaris LC
    - Subfamily: Xerinae
      - Tribe: Marmotini
        - Genus: Marmota
          - Alpine marmot, M. marmota LC introduced
  - Family: Gliridae (dormice)
    - Subfamily: Leithiinae
      - Genus: Eliomys
        - Garden dormouse, E. quercinus NT
    - Subfamily: Glirinae
      - Genus: Glis
        - European edible dormouse, G. glis LC
- Suborder: Myomorpha
  - Family: Cricetidae (hamsters, voles, lemmings)
    - Subfamily: Arvicolinae
      - Genus: Arvicola
        - Southwestern water vole, A. sapidus VU
        - European water vole, A. amphibius LC
      - Genus: Chionomys
        - Snow vole, C. nivalis LC
      - Genus: Microtus
        - Cabrera's vole, M. cabrerae NT
        - Field vole, M. agrestis LC
        - Common vole, M. arvalis LC
        - Mediterranean pine vole, M. duodecimcostatus LC
        - Gerbe's vole, M. gerbei LC
        - Lusitanian pine vole, M. lusitanicus LC
      - Genus: Clethrionomys
        - Bank vole, C. glareolus LC
      - Genus: Ondatra
        - Muskrat, O. zibethicus LC introduced
  - Family: Muridae (mice and rats)
    - Subfamily: Murinae
      - Genus: Apodemus
        - Yellow-necked mouse, A. flavicollis LC
        - Wood mouse, A. sylvaticus LC
      - Genus: Micromys
        - Eurasian harvest mouse, M. minutus LC
      - Genus: Mus
        - House mouse, M. musculus LC
        - Algerian mouse, M. spretus LC
      - Genus: Rattus
        - Brown rat, R. norvegicus LC introduced
        - Black rat, R. rattus LC introduced
  - Family: Myocastoridae (coypu)
    - Subfamily: Myocastorinae
      - Genus: Myocastor
        - Coypu, M. coypus LC introduced

== Order: Lagomorpha (lagomorphs) ==
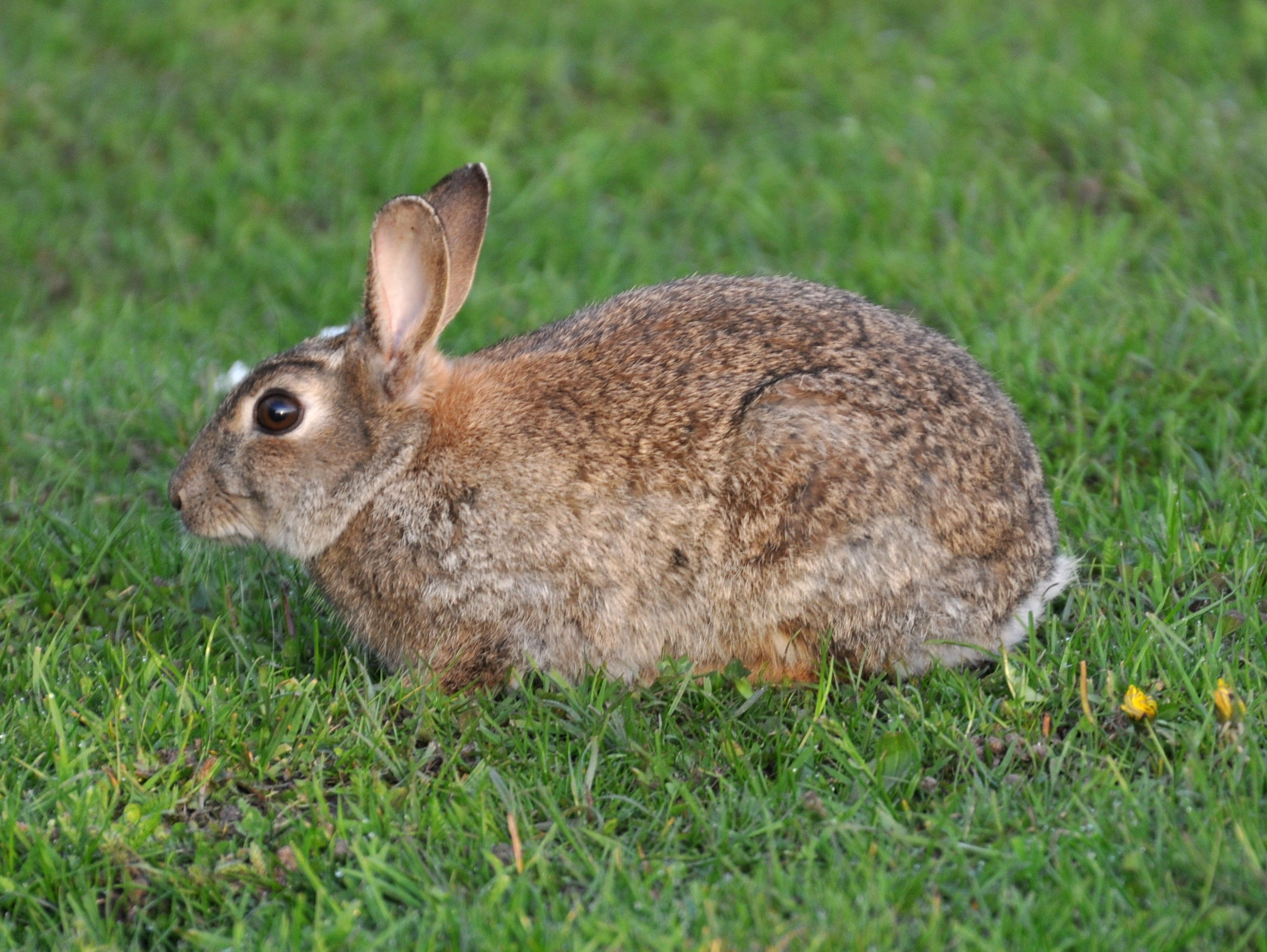
European rabbit

The lagomorphs comprise two families, Leporidae (hares and rabbits), and Ochotonidae (pikas). Though they can resemble rodents, and were classified as a superfamily in that order until the early 20th century, they have since been considered a separate order. They differ from rodents in a number of physical characteristics, such as having four incisors in the upper jaw rather than two.

- Family: Leporidae (rabbits, hares)
  - Genus: Lepus
    - Broom hare, L. castroviejoi VU
    - European hare, L. europaeus LC
    - Granada hare, L. granatensis LC
  - Genus: Oryctolagus
    - European rabbit, O. cuniculus EN

== Order: Erinaceomorpha (hedgehogs and gymnures) ==
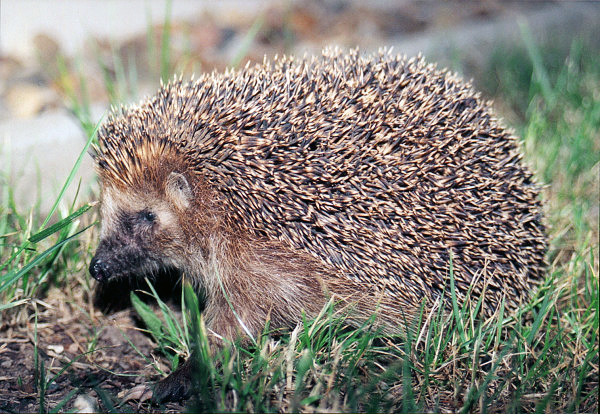
West European hedgehog

The order Erinaceomorpha contains a single family, Erinaceidae, which comprise the hedgehogs and gymnures. The hedgehogs are easily recognised by their spines while gymnures look more like large rats.

- Family: Erinaceidae (hedgehogs)
  - Subfamily: Erinaceinae
    - Genus: Atelerix
      - North African hedgehog, A. algirus LC introduced
    - Genus: Erinaceus
      - West European hedgehog, E. europaeus LC

== Order: Soricomorpha (shrews, moles, and solenodons) ==
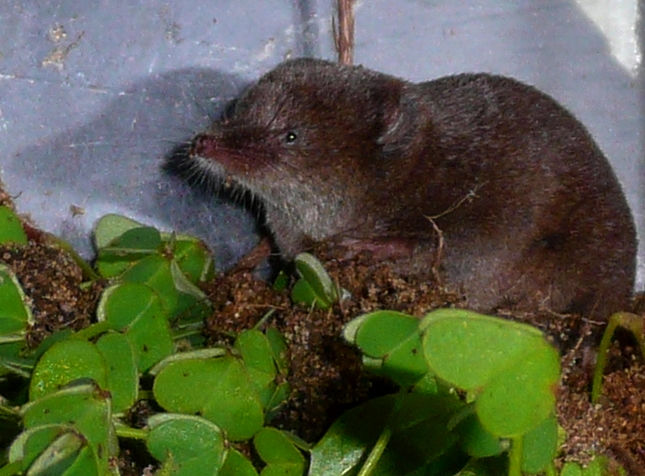
Iberian shrew

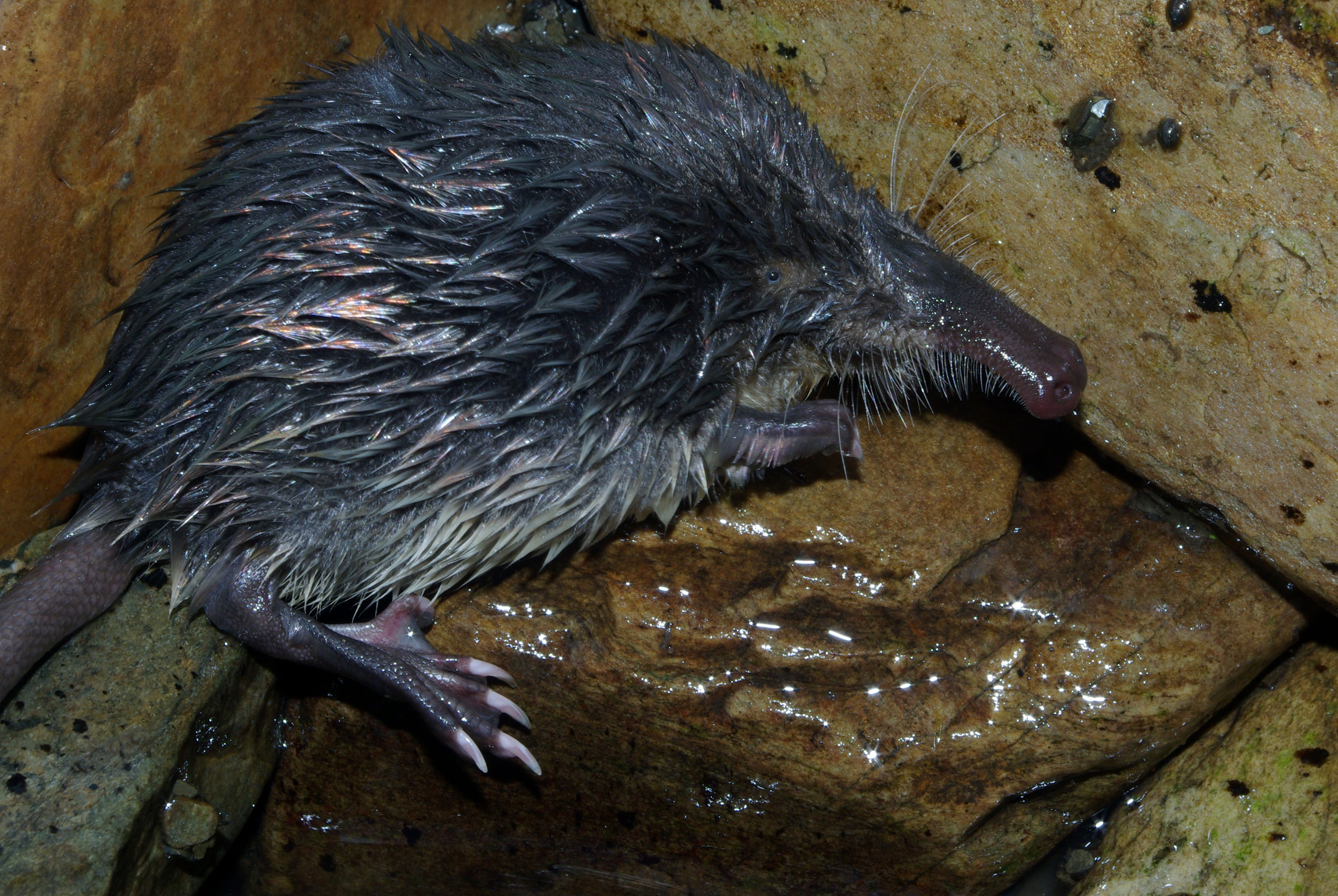
Pyrenean desman

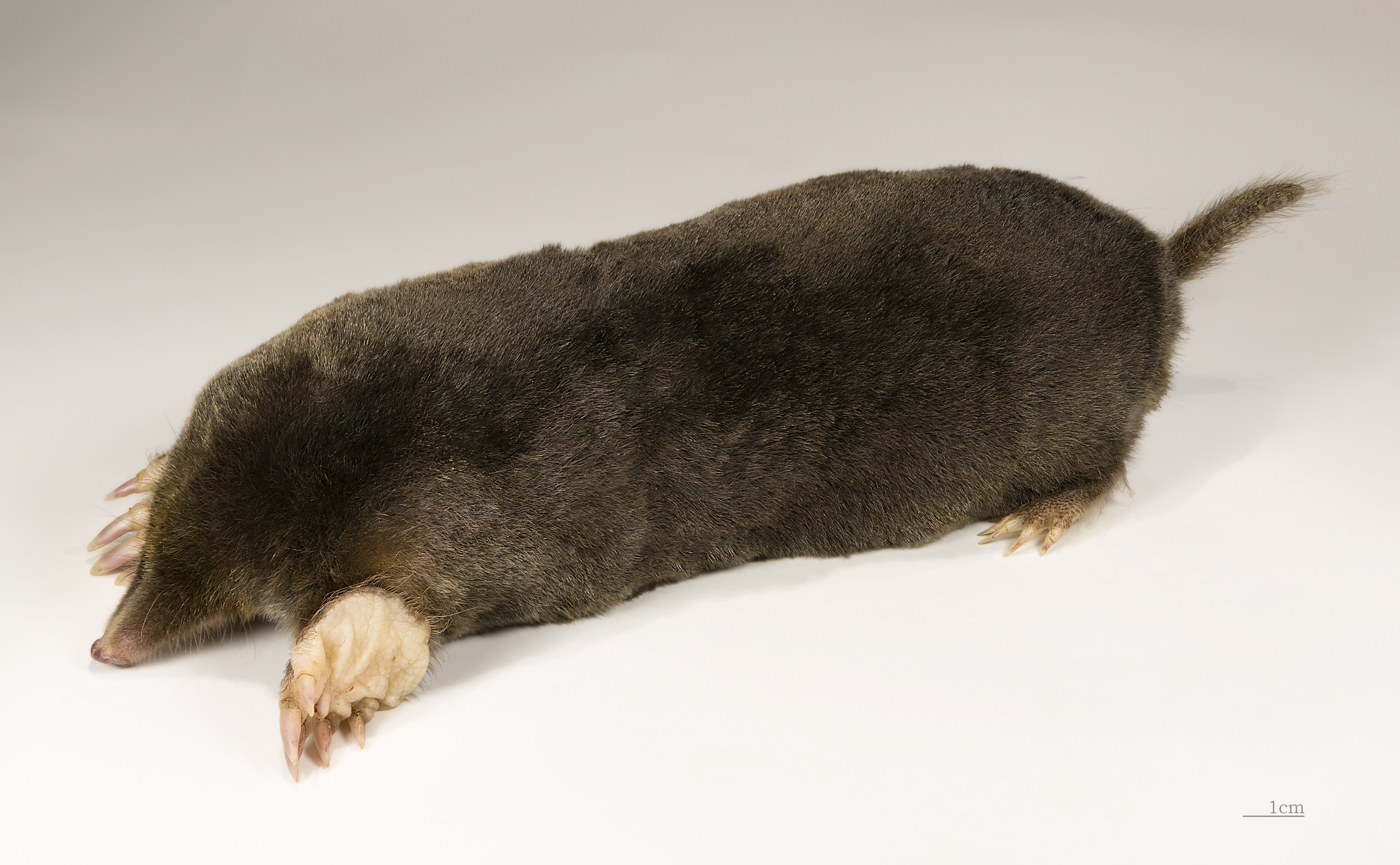
European mole

The "shrew-forms" are insectivorous mammals. The shrews and solenodons closely resemble mice while the moles are stout bodied burrowers.

- Family: Soricidae (shrews)
  - Subfamily: Crocidurinae
    - Genus: Crocidura
      - Greater white-toothed shrew, C. russula LC
      - Lesser white-toothed shrew, C. suaveolens LC
    - Genus: Suncus
      - Etruscan shrew, S. etruscus LC
  - Subfamily: Soricinae
    - Tribe: Nectogalini
      - Genus: Neomys
        - Southern water shrew, N. anomalus LC
        - Eurasian water shrew, N. fodiens LC
    - Tribe: Soricini
      - Genus: Sorex
        - Common shrew, S. araneus LC
        - Crowned shrew, S. coronatus LC
        - Iberian shrew, S. granarius LC
        - Eurasian pygmy shrew, S. minutus LC
- Family: Talpidae (moles)
  - Subfamily: Talpinae
    - Tribe: Desmanini
      - Genus: Galemys
        - Pyrenean desman, G. pyrenaicus VU
    - Tribe: Talpini
      - Genus: Talpa (genus)
        - European mole, T. europaea LC
        - Iberian mole, T. occidentalis LC

== Order: Chiroptera (bats) ==
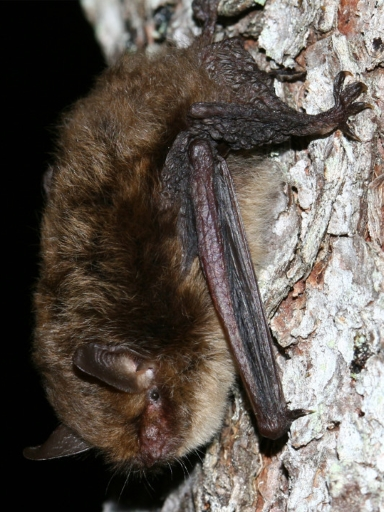
Alcathoe bat

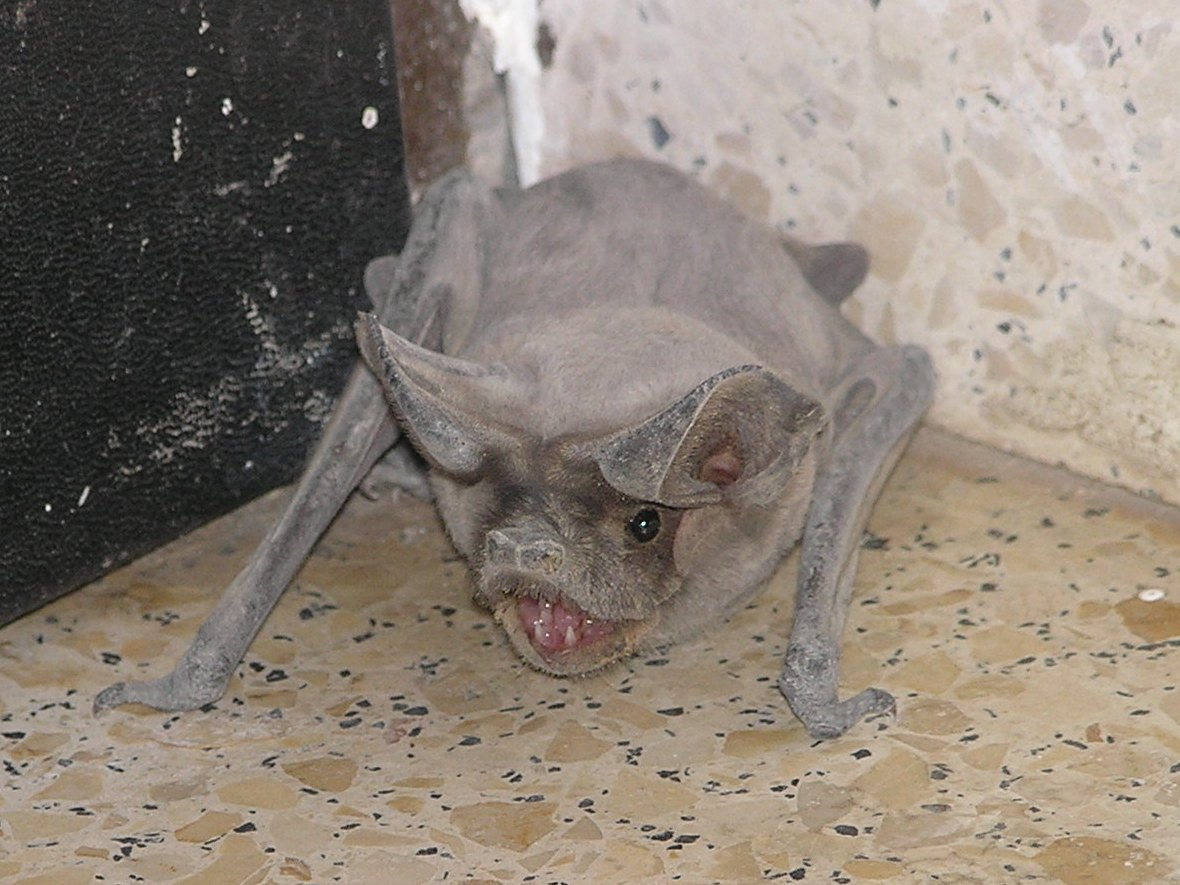
European free-tailed bat

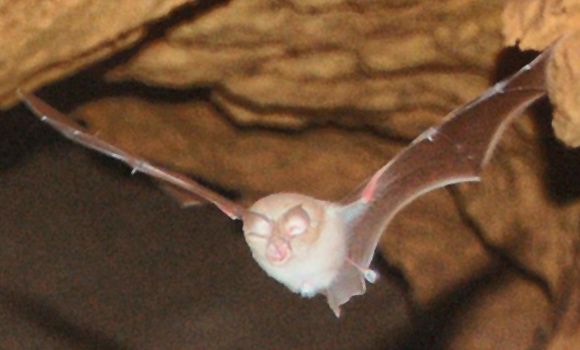
Mediterranean horseshoe bat

The bats' most distinguishing feature is that their forelimbs are developed as wings, making them the only mammals capable of flight. Bat species account for about 20% of all mammals.

- Suborder: Microchiroptera
  - Family: Vespertilionidae
    - Subfamily: Myotinae
      - Genus: Myotis
        - Alcathoe bat, M. alcathoe DD
        - Bechstein's bat, M. bechsteini NT
        - Lesser mouse-eared bat, M. blythii LC
        - Long-fingered bat, M. capaccinii VU
        - Cryptic myotis, M. crypticus
        - Daubenton's bat, M. daubentonii LC
        - Geoffroy's bat, M. emarginatus LC
        - Escalera's bat, M. escalerai LC
        - Greater mouse-eared bat, M. myotis LC
        - Whiskered bat, M. mystacinus LC
        - Natterer's bat, M. nattereri LC
    - Subfamily: Vespertilioninae
      - Genus: Barbastella
        - Western barbastelle, B. barbastellus NT
      - Genus: Eptesicus
        - Meridional serotine, E. isabellinus LC
        - Serotine bat, E. serotinus LC
      - Genus: Hypsugo
        - Savi's pipistrelle, H. savii LC
      - Genus: Nyctalus
        - Greater noctule bat, N. lasiopterus NT
        - Lesser noctule, N. leisleri LC
        - Common noctule, N. noctula LC
      - Genus: Pipistrellus
        - Nathusius' pipistrelle, P. nathusii LC
        - Kuhl's pipistrelle, P. kuhlii LC
        - Common pipistrelle, P. pipistrellus LC
        - Soprano pipistrelle, P. pygmaeus LC
      - Genus: Plecotus
        - Alpine long-eared bat, P. macrobullaris NT
        - Brown long-eared bat, P. auritus LC
        - Grey long-eared bat, P. austriacus NT
    - Subfamily: Miniopterinae
      - Genus: Miniopterus
        - Common bent-wing bat, M. schreibersii VU
  - Family: Molossidae
    - Genus: Tadarida
      - European free-tailed bat, T. teniotis LC
  - Family: Rhinolophidae
    - Subfamily: Rhinolophinae
      - Genus: Rhinolophus
        - Mediterranean horseshoe bat, R. euryale NT
        - Greater horseshoe bat, R. ferrumequinum LC
        - Lesser horseshoe bat, R. hipposideros LC
        - Mehely's horseshoe bat, R. mehelyi VU

== Order: Cetacea (whales) ==
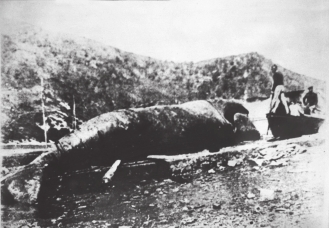
Last North Atlantic right whale killed by whalers in Orio, Spain (1901)

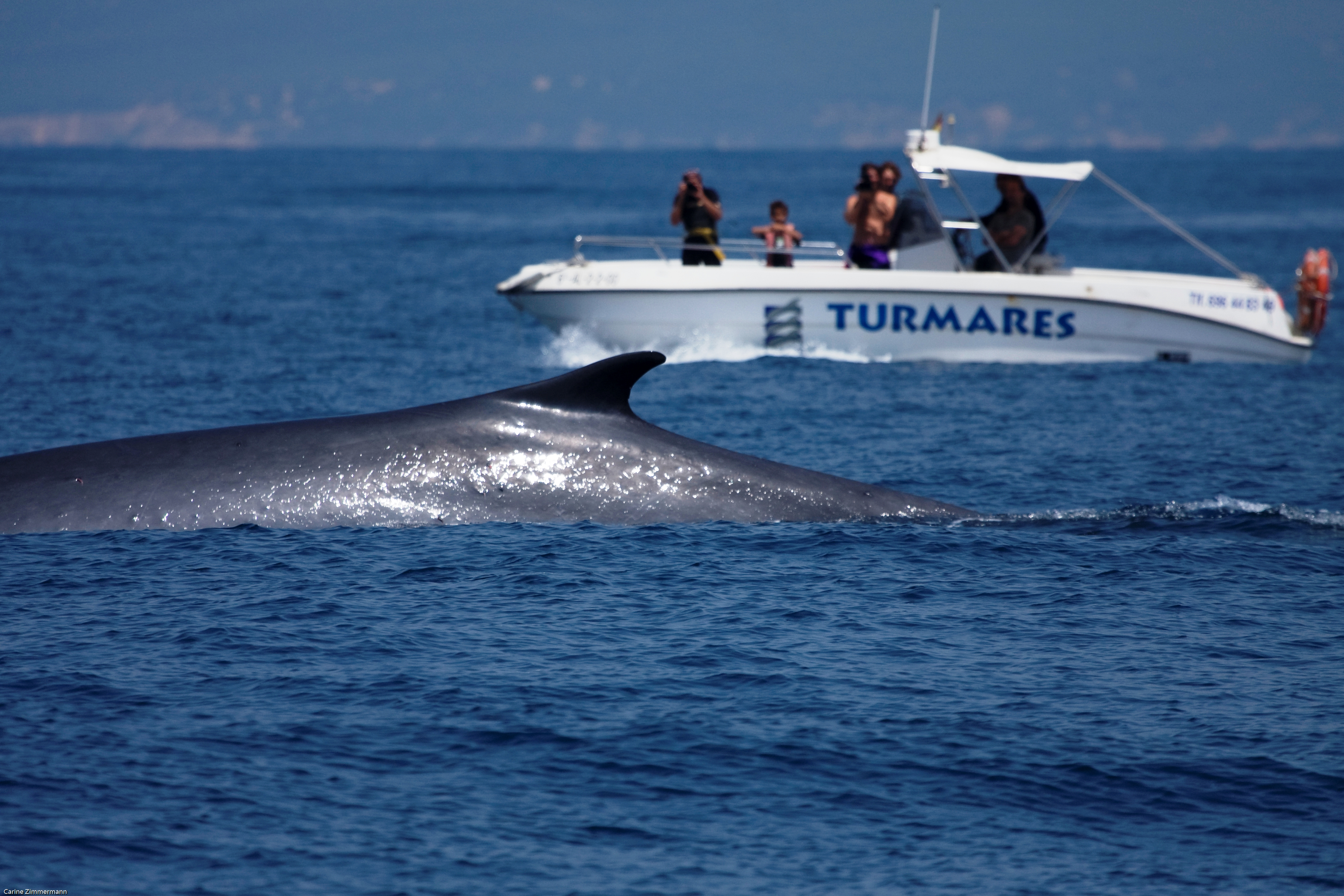
Fin whale watching off Tarifa in strait of Gibraltar

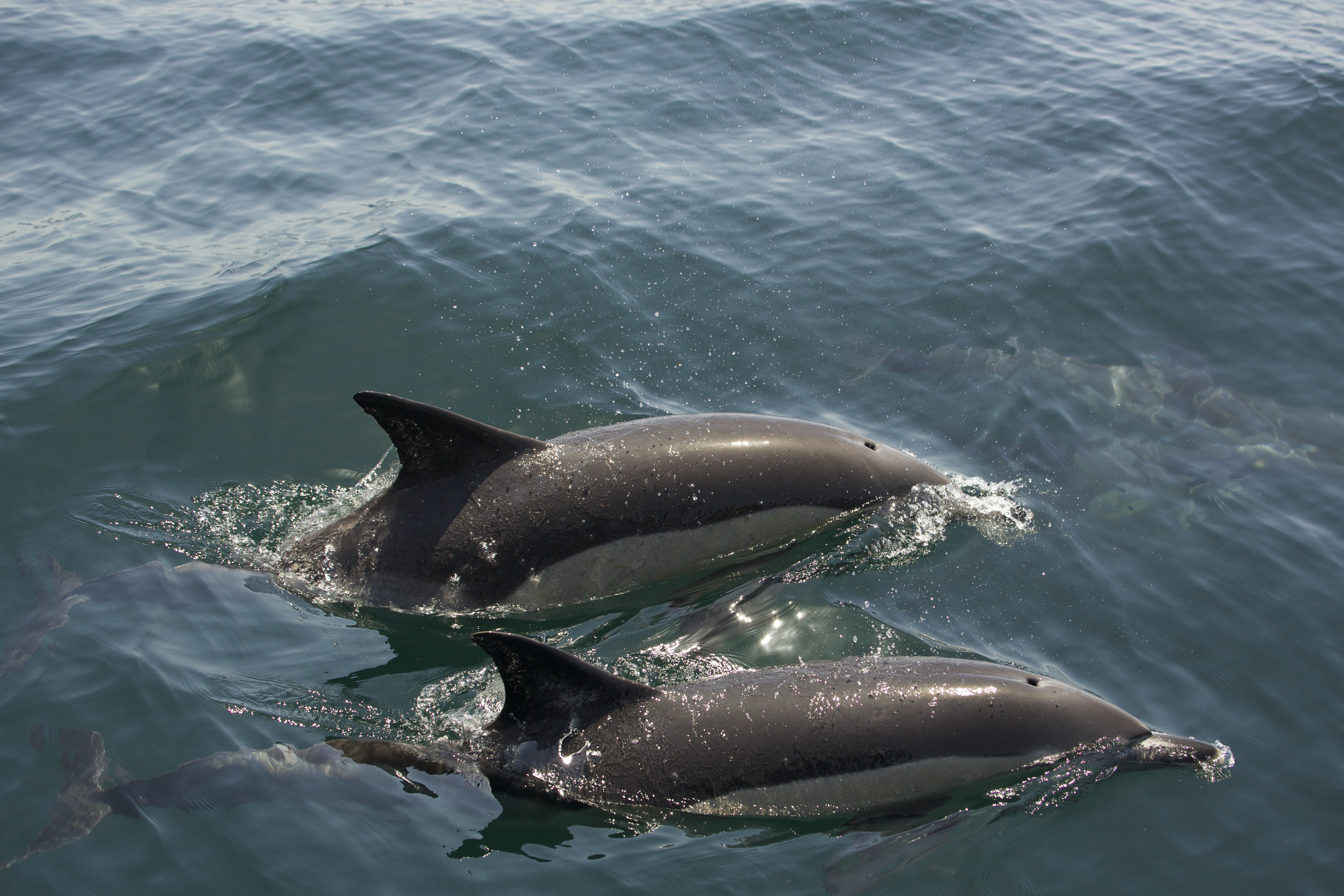
Common dolphins in Gibraltar Bay

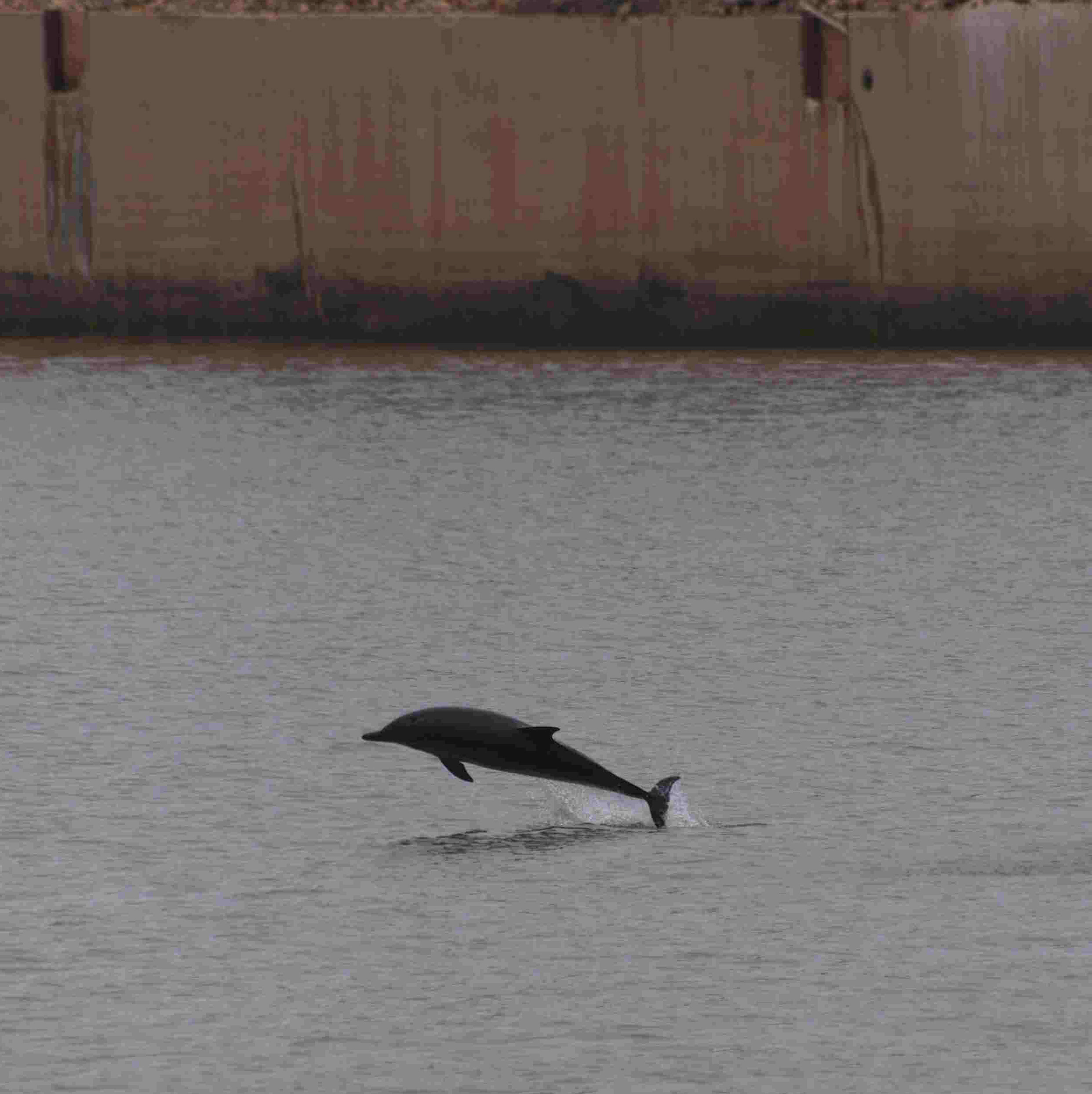
Small numbers of striped dolphins around Gijón

The order Cetacea includes whales, dolphins and porpoises. They are the mammals most fully adapted to aquatic life with a spindle-shaped nearly hairless body, protected by a thick layer of blubber, and forelimbs and tail modified to provide propulsion underwater.

- Suborder: Mysticeti
  - Family: Balaenidae (right whales)
    - Genus: Eubalaena
      - North Atlantic right whale, E. glacialis CR
  - Family: Balaenopteridae (rorquals)
    - Subfamily: Balaenopterinae
      - Genus: Balaenoptera
        - Blue whale, B. musculus EN
        - Sei whale, B. borealis EN
        - Fin whale, B. physalus VU
        - Minke whale, B. acutorostrata LC
    - Subfamily: Megapterinae
      - Genus: Megaptera
        - Humpback whale, M. novaeangliae LC
- Suborder: Odontoceti
  - Family: Delphinidae (marine dolphins)
    - Genus: Lagenorhynchus
      - White-beaked dolphin, Lagenorhynchus albirostris LC
    - Genus: Leucopleurus
      - Atlantic white-sided dolphin, Leucopleurus acutus LC
    - Genus: Steno
      - Rough-toothed dolphin, S. bredanensis DD
    - Genus: Stenella
      - Striped dolphin, S. coeruleoalba LC
      - Atlantic spotted dolphin, S. frontalis LC
    - Genus: Delphinus
      - Common dolphin, D. delphis LC
    - Genus: Globicephala
      - Pilot whale, G. melas DD
      - Short-finned pilot whale, G. macrorhynchus LC
    - Genus: Grampus
      - Risso's dolphin, G. griseus DD
    - Genus: Feresa
      - Pygmy killer whale, F. attenuata LC
    - Genus: Pseudorca
      - False killer whale, P. crassidens NT
    - Genus: Orcinus
      - Orca, O. orca DD
    - Genus: Tursiops
      - Common bottlenose dolphin, T. truncatus VU
  - Family: Kogiidae (small sperm whales)
    - Genus: Kogia
      - Pygmy sperm whale, K. breviceps DD
      - Dwarf sperm whale, K. sima DD
  - Family: Phocoenidae (porpoises)
    - Genus: Phocoena
      - Harbour porpoise, P. phocoena VU
  - Family: Physeteridae (sperm whales)
    - Genus: Physeter
      - Sperm whale, P. macrocephalus VU
  - Family: Ziphiidae (beaked whales)
    - Genus: Ziphius
      - Cuvier's beaked whale, Z. cavirostris DD
    - Subfamily: Hyperoodontinae
      - Genus: Hyperoodon
        - Northern bottlenose whale, H. ampullatus DD
      - Genus: Mesoplodon
        - Sowerby's beaked whale, M. bidens DD
        - Blainville's beaked whale, M. densirostris DD
        - Gervais' beaked whale, M. europaeus DD
        - True's beaked whale, M. mirus DD

== Order: Carnivora (carnivorans) ==
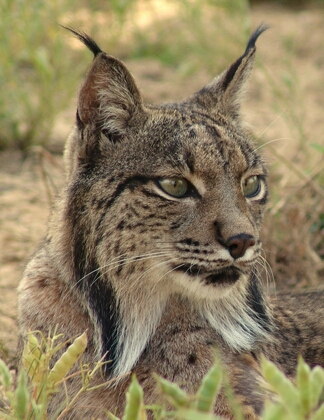
Iberian lynx

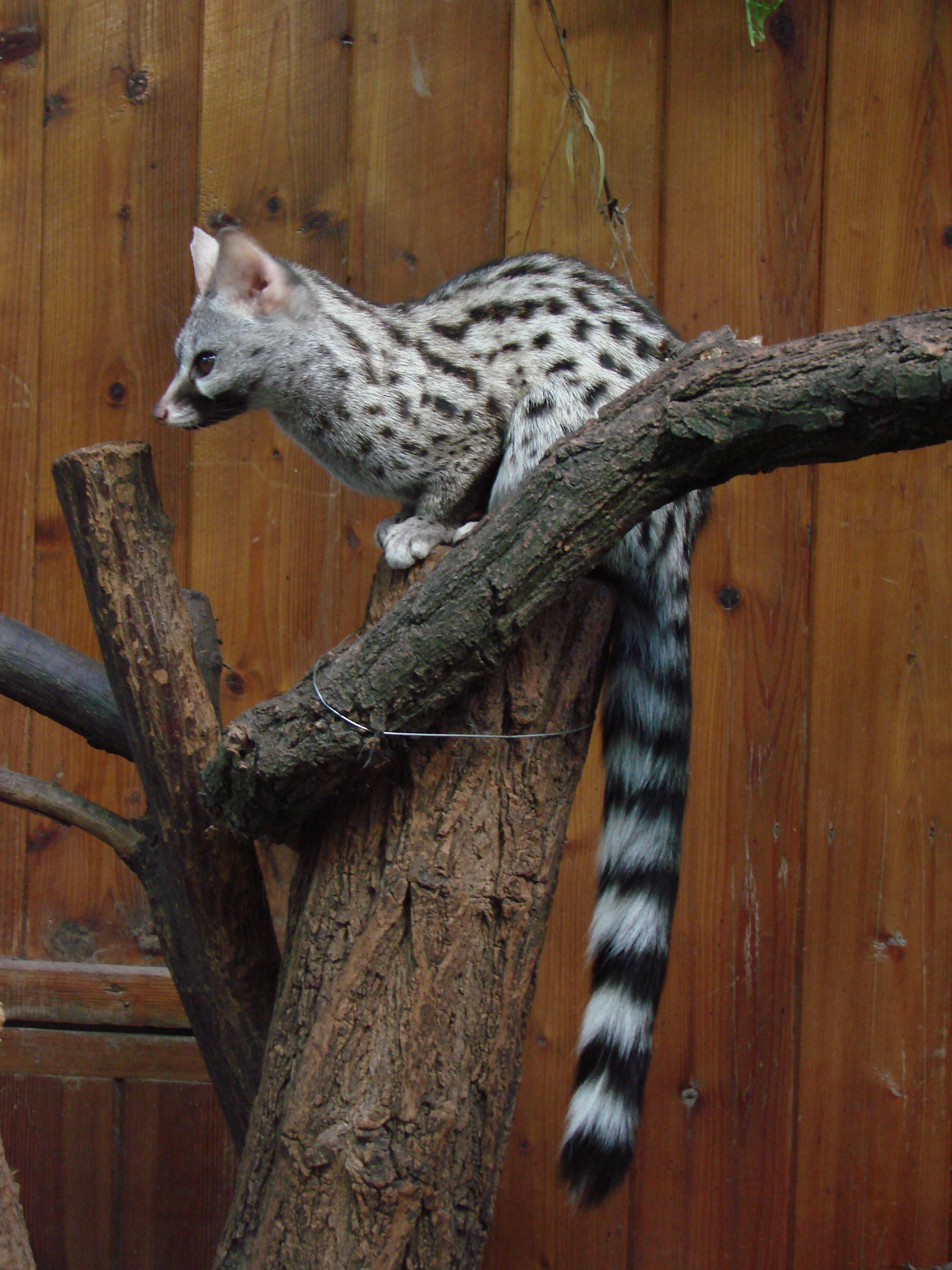
Common genet

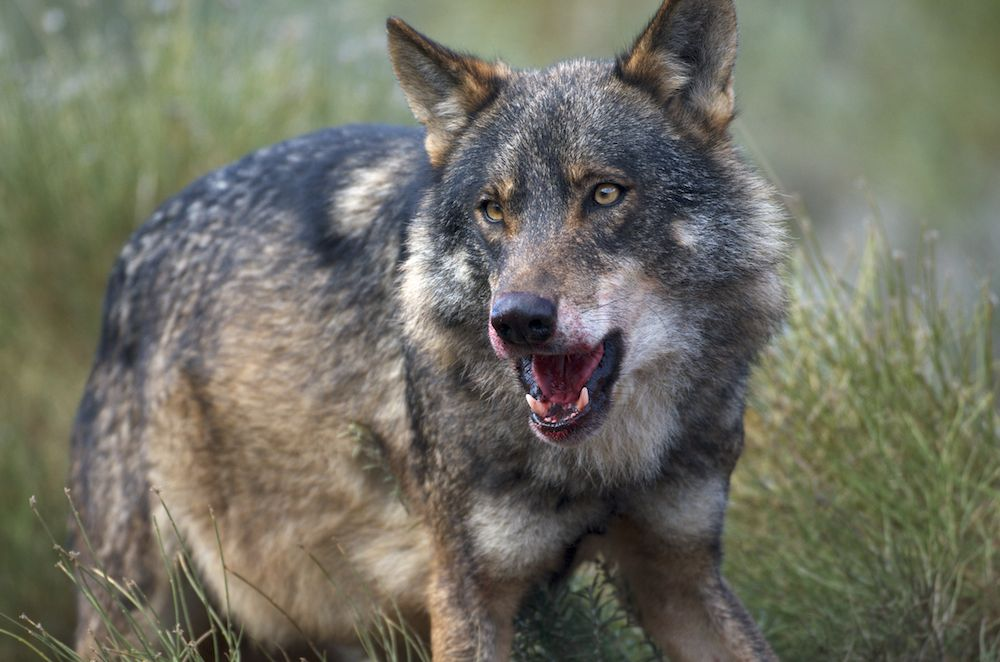
Iberian wolf

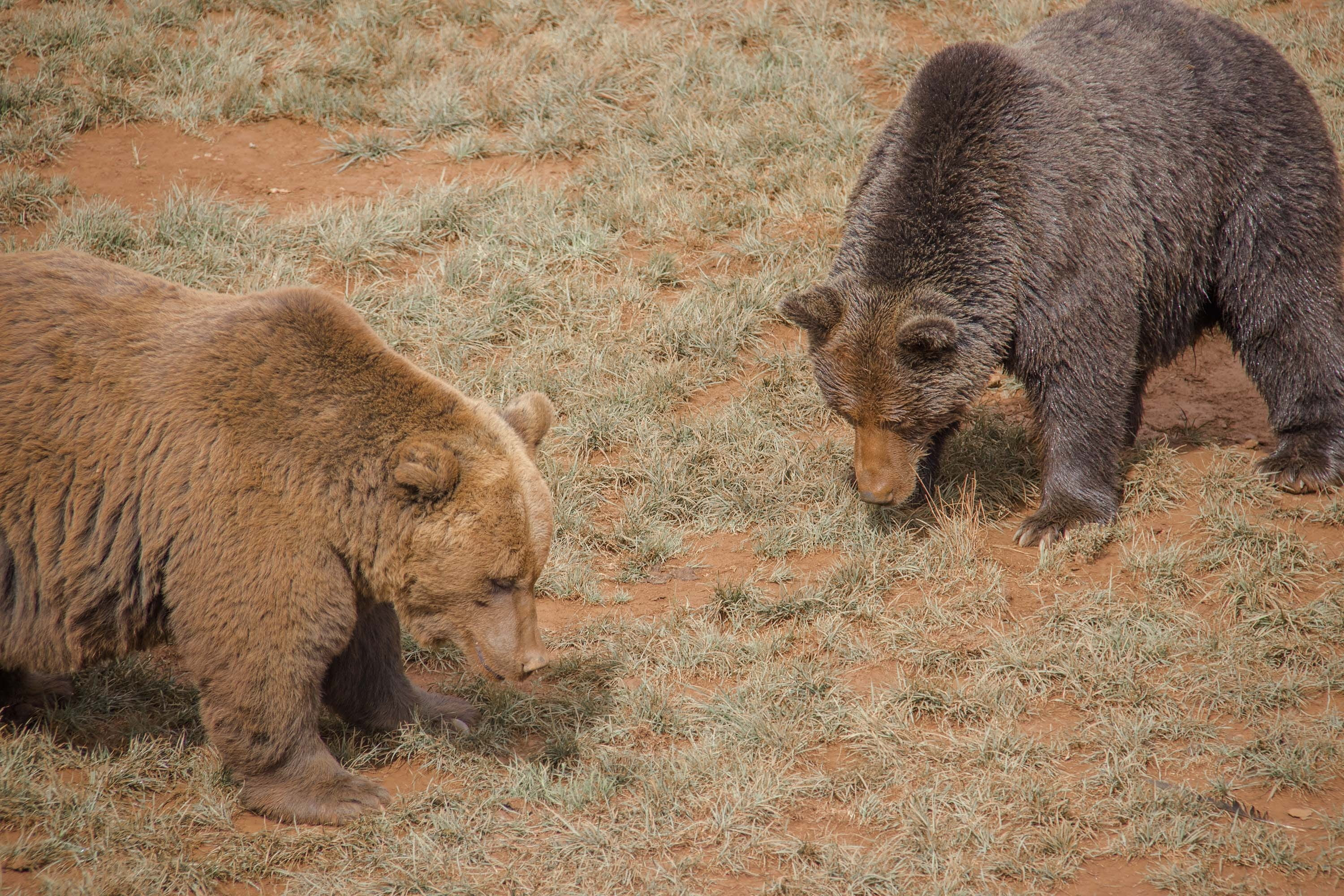
Cantabrian brown bears in Cabarceno Natural Park

There are over 260 species of carnivorans, the majority of which feed primarily on meat. They have a characteristic skull shape and dentition.

- Suborder: Feliformia
  - Family: Felidae
    - Subfamily: Felinae
      - Genus: Felis
        - European wildcat, F. silvestris LC
      - Genus: Lynx
        - Iberian lynx, L. pardinus VU
  - Family: Viverridae
    - Subfamily: Viverrinae
      - Genus: Genetta
        - Common genet, G. genetta LC introduced
  - Family: Herpestidae (mongooses)
    - Genus: Herpestes
      - Egyptian mongoose, H. ichneumon LC
- Suborder: Caniformia
  - Family: Canidae (dogs, foxes)
    - Genus: Canis
      - Gray wolf, C. lupus LC
        - Iberian wolf, C. l. signatus
    - Genus: Vulpes
      - Red fox, V. vulpes LC
  - Family: Ursidae (bears)
    - Genus: Ursus
      - Brown bear, U. arctos LC
        - Cantabrian brown bear, U. a. arctos
  - Family: Procyonidae (raccoons)
    - Genus: Procyon
      - Raccoon, P. lotor LC introduced
  - Family: Mustelidae (mustelids)
    - Genus: Lutra
      - European otter, L. lutra NT
    - Genus: Martes
      - Beech marten, M. foina LC
      - European pine marten, M. martes LC
    - Genus: Meles
      - European badger, M. meles LC
    - Genus: Mustela
      - Stoat, M. erminea LC
      - European mink, M. lutreola CR
      - Least weasel, M. nivalis LC
      - European polecat, M. putorius LC
    - Genus: Neogale
      - American mink, N. vison LC introduced

== Order: Artiodactyla (even-toed ungulates) ==
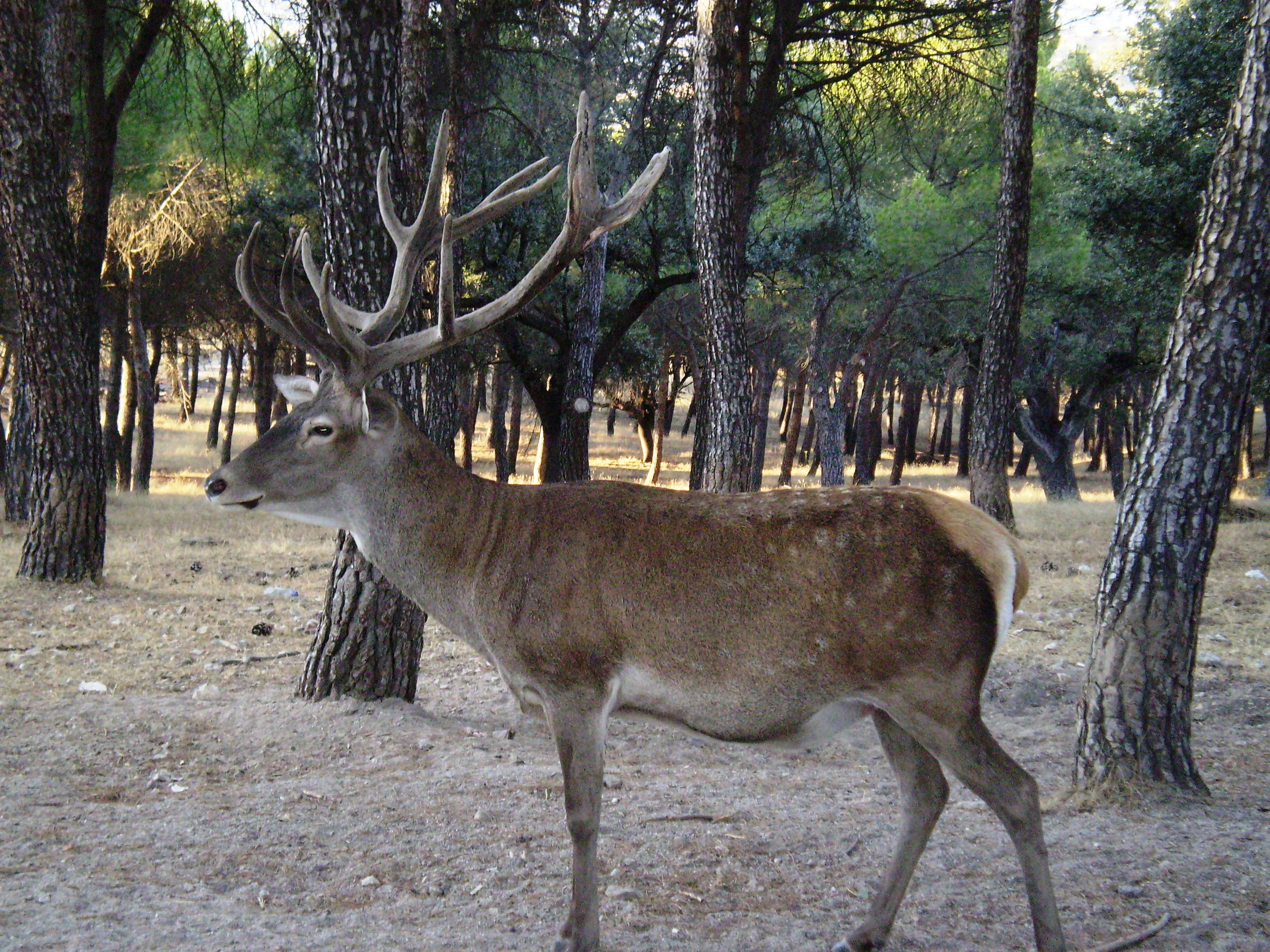
Spanish red deer in El Pardo.

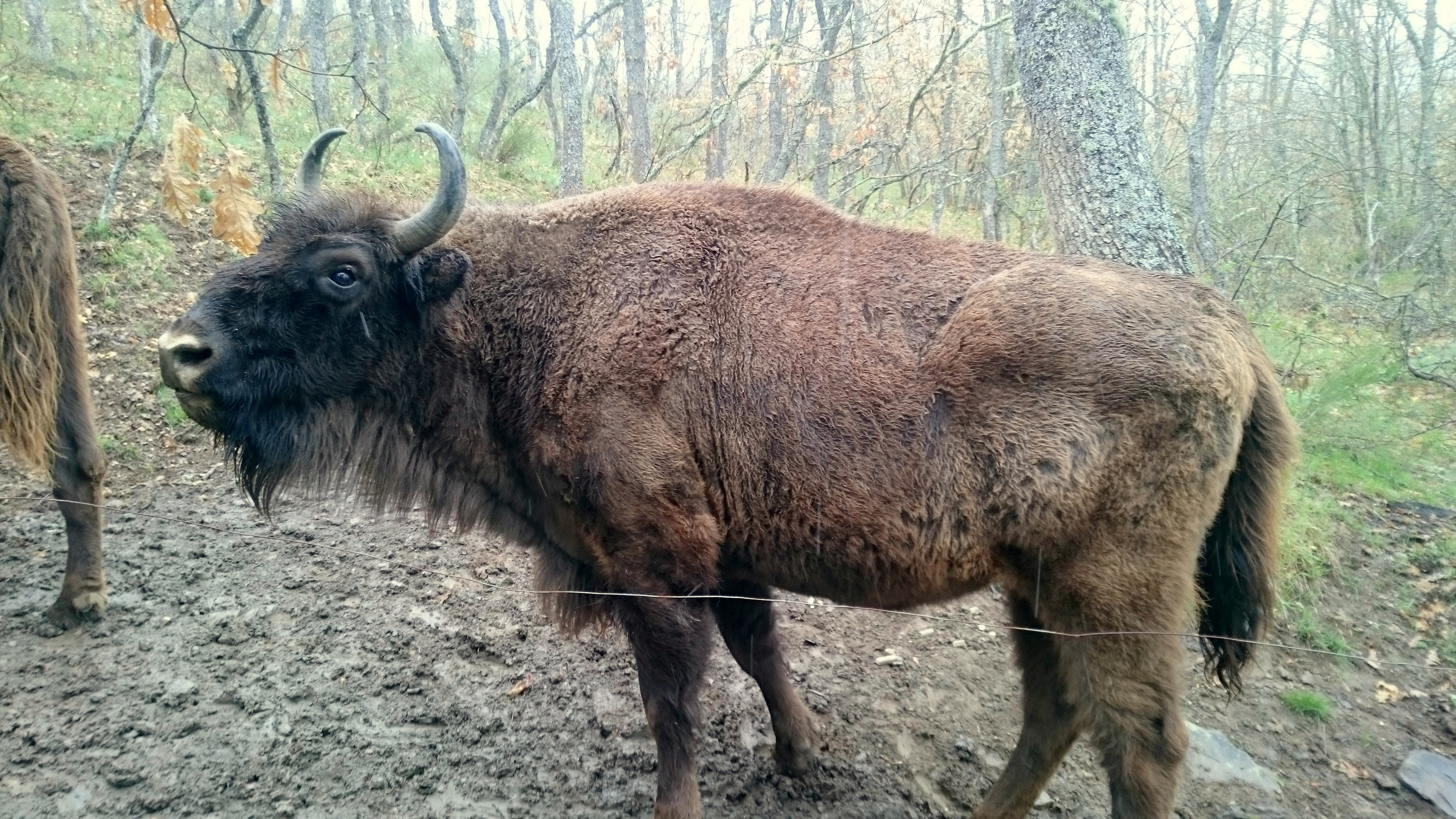
European bison in San Cebrián de Mudá.

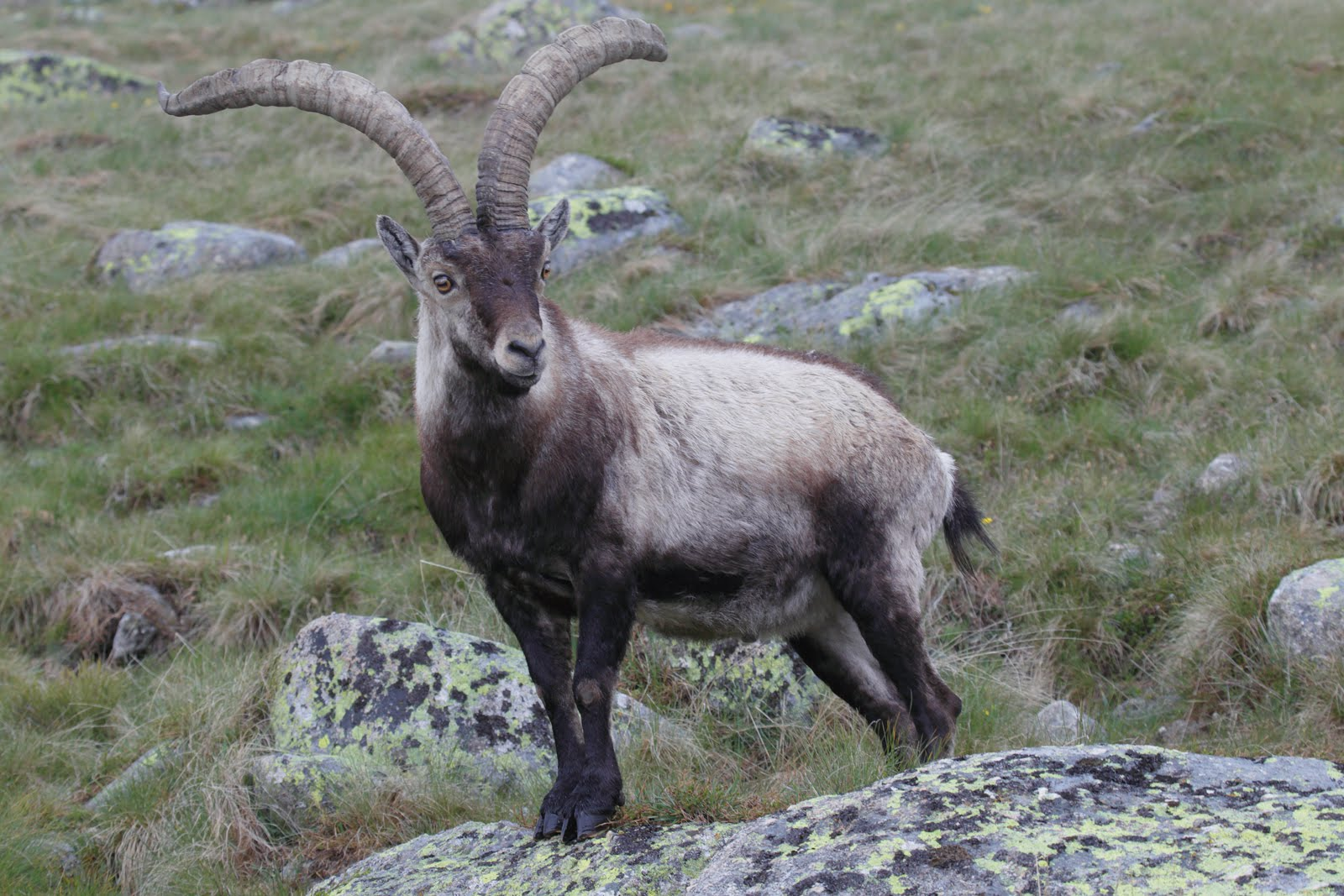
Male Iberian ibex

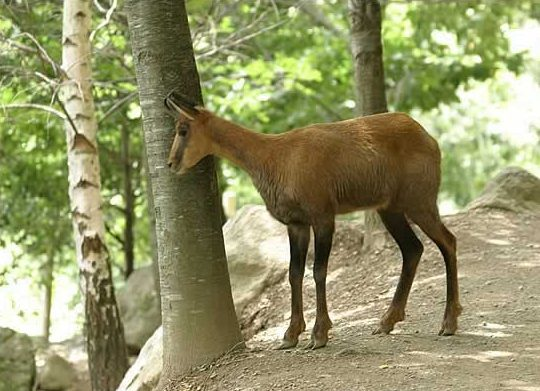
Pyrenean chamois

The even-toed ungulates are ungulates whose weight is borne about equally by the third and fourth toes, rather than mostly or ENtirely by the third as in perissodactyls. There are about 222 artiodactyl species, including many that are of great economic importance to humans.

- Family: Suidae (pigs)
  - Subfamily: Suinae
    - Genus: Sus
      - Wild boar, S. scrofa LC
- Family: Cervidae (deer)
  - Subfamily: Cervinae
    - Genus: Cervus
      - Red deer, C. elaphus LC
        - Spanish red deer, C. e. hispanicus
    - Genus: Dama
      - European fallow deer, D. dama LC, introduced
  - Subfamily: Capreolinae
    - Genus: Capreolus
      - Roe deer, C. capreolus LC
- Family: Bovidae
  - Subfamily: Bovinae
    - Genus: Bison
      - European bison, B. bonasus NT
  - Subfamily: Caprinae
    - Genus: Ammotragus
      - Barbary sheep, A. lervia VU, introduced
    - Genus: Capra
      - Iberian ibex, C. pyrenaica LC
        - Southeastern Spanish ibex, C. p. hispanica
        - Western Spanish ibex, C. p. victoriae
    - Genus: Equus
      - Wild horse, Equus ferus
        - Przewalski's horse, E. ferus przewalski EN, introduced
    - Genus: Ovis
      - European mouflon, O. aries introduced
    - Genus: Rupicapra
      - Pyrenean chamois, R. pyrenaica LC

== Globally and locally extinct ==
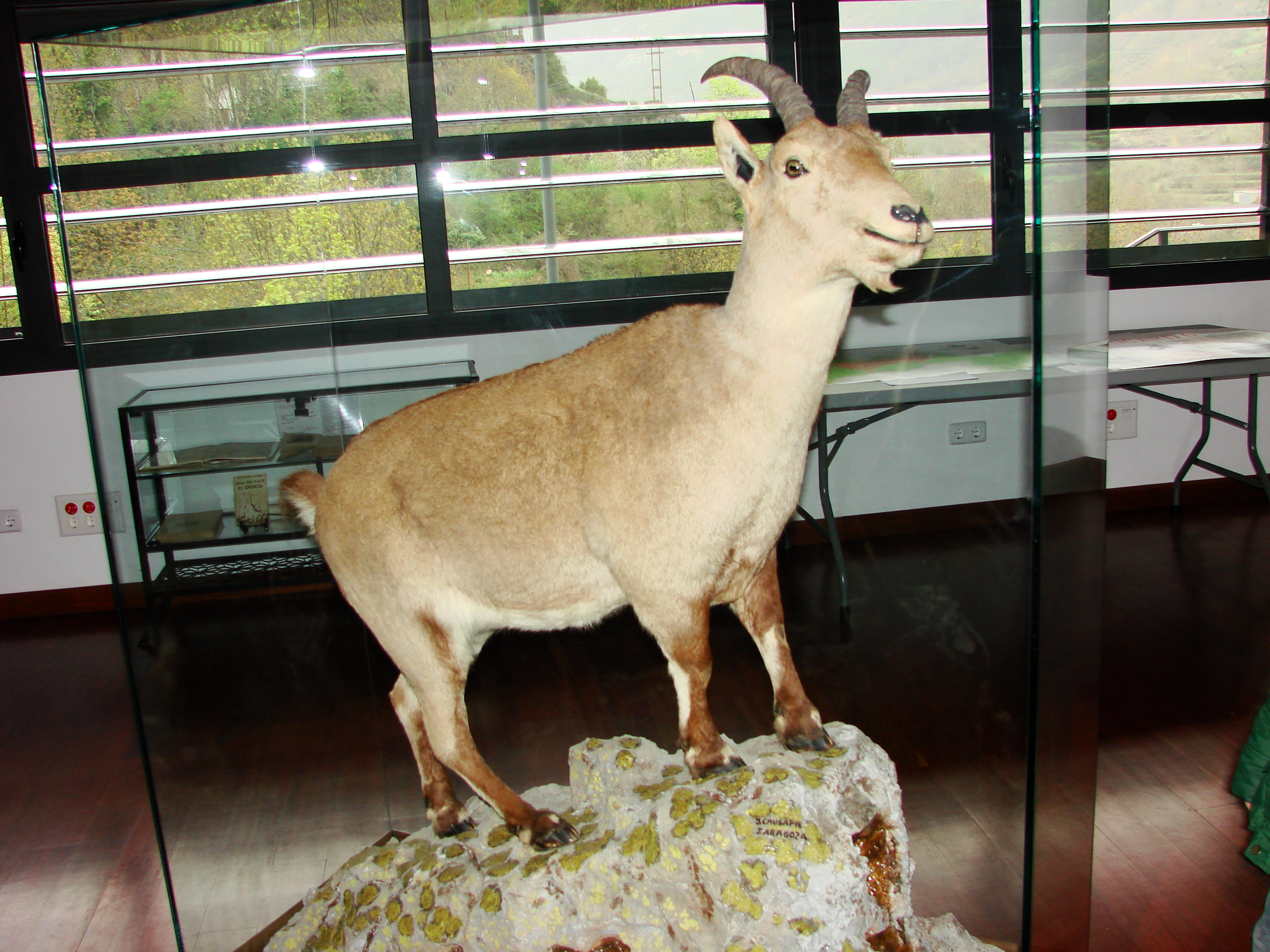
Pyrenean ibex

The following species are globally extinct:

- Aurochs, Bos primigenius EX (1627)
- Portuguese ibex, Capra pyrenaica lusitanica EX (c. 1890)
- Pyrenean ibex, C. p. pyrenaica EX (2003)
- Tarpan, Equus ferus ferus EX (1909)

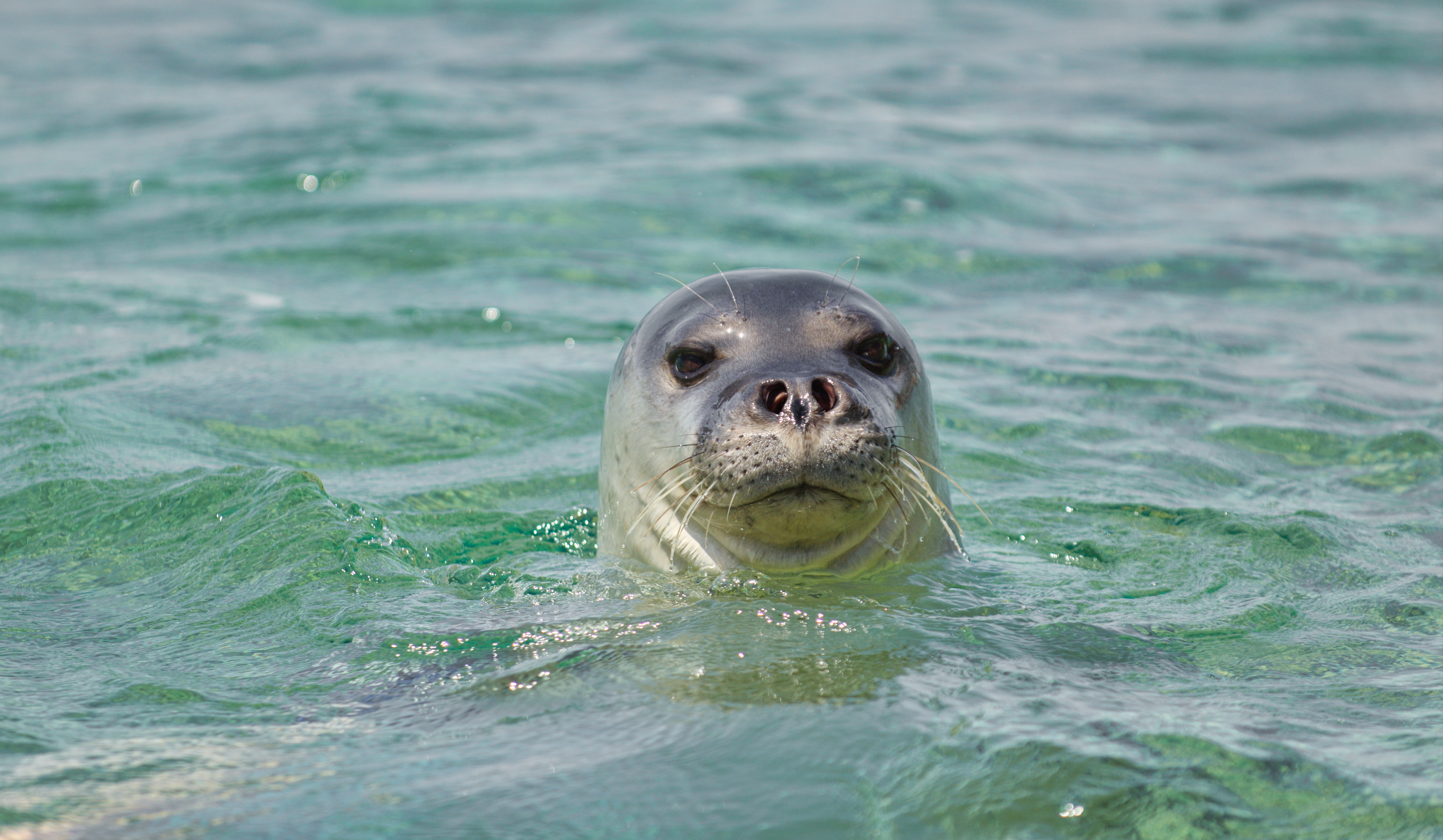
Mediterranean monk seal

The following species are locally extinct in peninsular Spain but continue to exist elsewhere:

- Gray whale, Eschrichtius robustus
- Eurasian lynx, Lynx lynx
- Mediterranean monk seal, Monachus monachus
- Alpine shrew, Sorex alpinus

== See also ==
- List of chordate orders
- Lists of mammals by region
- Mammal classification
