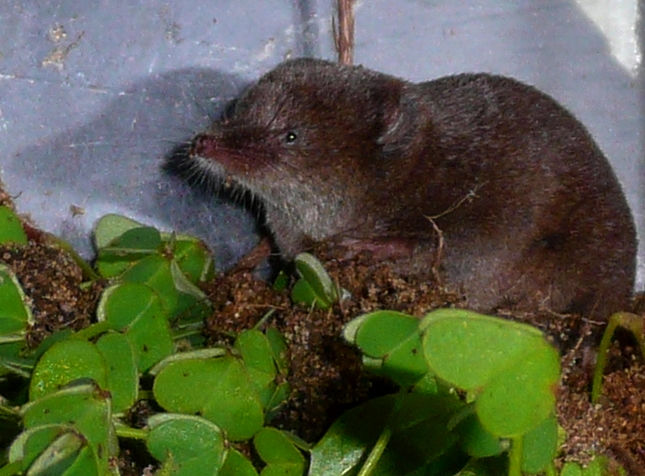

Conservation status
- Least Concern (IUCN 3.1)

Scientific classification
- Kingdom: Animalia
- Phylum: Chordata
- Class: Mammalia
- Order: Eulipotyphla
- Family: Soricidae
- Genus: Sorex
- Species: S. granarius

Binomial name
- Sorex granarius Miller, 1910
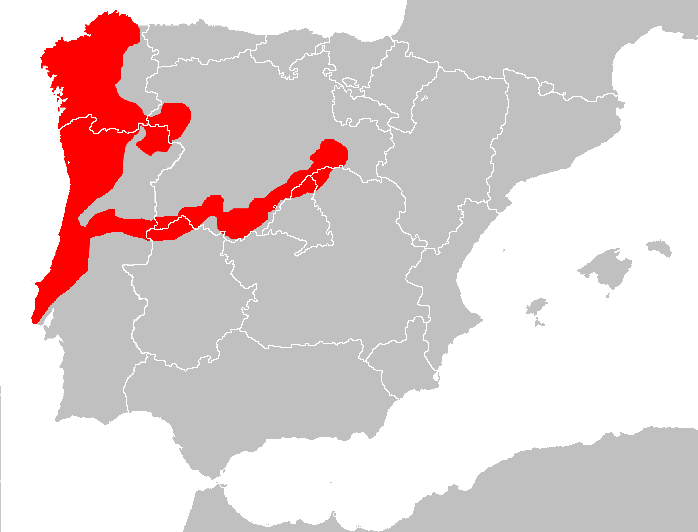
- Iberian shrew range

= Iberian shrew =

Species of mammal

The Iberian shrew or Lagranja shrew (Sorex granarius) is a species of mammal in the family Soricidae. It is found in Portugal and Spain.

== Description ==
Relative to other Sorex species, S. granarius is intermediate in size, with a total body length (including the tail) of approximately 103.6 mm and an average weight of 6.3 g. Adults are identified by their dark-colored back, which contrasts with their lighter tan sides and off-white belly. The fur of young shrews has only two discernible colors: the darker color on the back and the lighter color on the belly. In both adults and juveniles, the fur is also adapted for cold, damp habitats: each guard hair possesses an indentation along its length that helps to prevent water from reaching the body.

The skull of S. granarius can be used to distinguish it from other species belonging to the European Sorex araneus group of shrews. Comparatively, the snout of S. granarius is small and flat, the mandible possesses a diminished coronoid process and a narrow angular process, and the temporal fossa of the skull resembles a triangle.

== Phylogeny ==
The Sorex araneus group of European shrews consists of S. araneus, S. coronatus, and S. granarius, with all members belonging to the order Soricomorpha and the family Soricidae. Because their morphology is virtually identical, species definitions rely primarily on genetic differences. The phylogenetic positioning of S. granarius has been historically difficult even with the use of genetic analyses. Mitochondrial DNA suggests that it is more closely related to S. araneus, while Y-chromosome markers imply a closer relationship with S. coronatus. More recent studies using both autosomal and X-chromosomal markers offer greater support for the phylogenetic grouping of S. granarius with S. coronatus, as opposed to the traditional grouping of S. granarius and S. araneus.

== Ecology ==
=== Distribution and habitat ===
The distribution of S. granarius is lateral through the Central System mountain range of the Iberian Peninsula and reaches Galicia, Spain in the north and the Tagus (Tejo) River in the south. There is also speculation of S. granarius cohabitation with S. coronatus in the Iberian System. In the wild, S. granarius is known to live in woody areas consisting of juniper (Juniperus nana), beech (Fagus sylvatica), Pyrenean oak (Quercus pyrenaica), Scots pine (Pinus sylvestris), evergreen oak (Quercus rotundifolia), ash (Fraxinus), or birch (Betula) at 500 to 2000 meter elevations.

=== Predators ===
Domestic cats (Felis catus), European wild cats (Felis silvestris), and barn owls (Tyto alba) have been noted to prey upon S. granarius.

== Genetics ==
=== Chromosomes ===
In the group of Sorex araneus shrews, males possess distinctive XY_{1}Y_{2} sex chromosomes. The Y chromosome comprises two portions: the original Y sex chromosome (Y_{1}) and a portion that forms an arm of one of the autosomal chromosomes (Y_{2}). S. granarius is unique among this group because it possesses primarily acrocentric chromosomes with only two pairs of metacentric chromosomes, whereas S. araneus has a complete set of metacentric chromosomes.

=== Telomeres ===
The telomere length and location of S. granarius further distinguish the organism from S. araneus: S. araneus possesses small telomeres on each chromosome that range in size from 6.8 to 15.2 kb. The telomeres of S. granarius are located only on the short arms of the acrocentric chromosomes, and can reach lengths of approximately 300 kb, making them the largest mammalian telomeres described to date. These mega-telomeres appear to preserve their impressive length through both the enzyme telomerase and active homologous recombination. Additionally, the intermittent repetitive sequences of S. granarius telomeres are infused with ribosomal DNA, and it is the only known Eutherian mammal with this feature.
