= Mega-telomere =

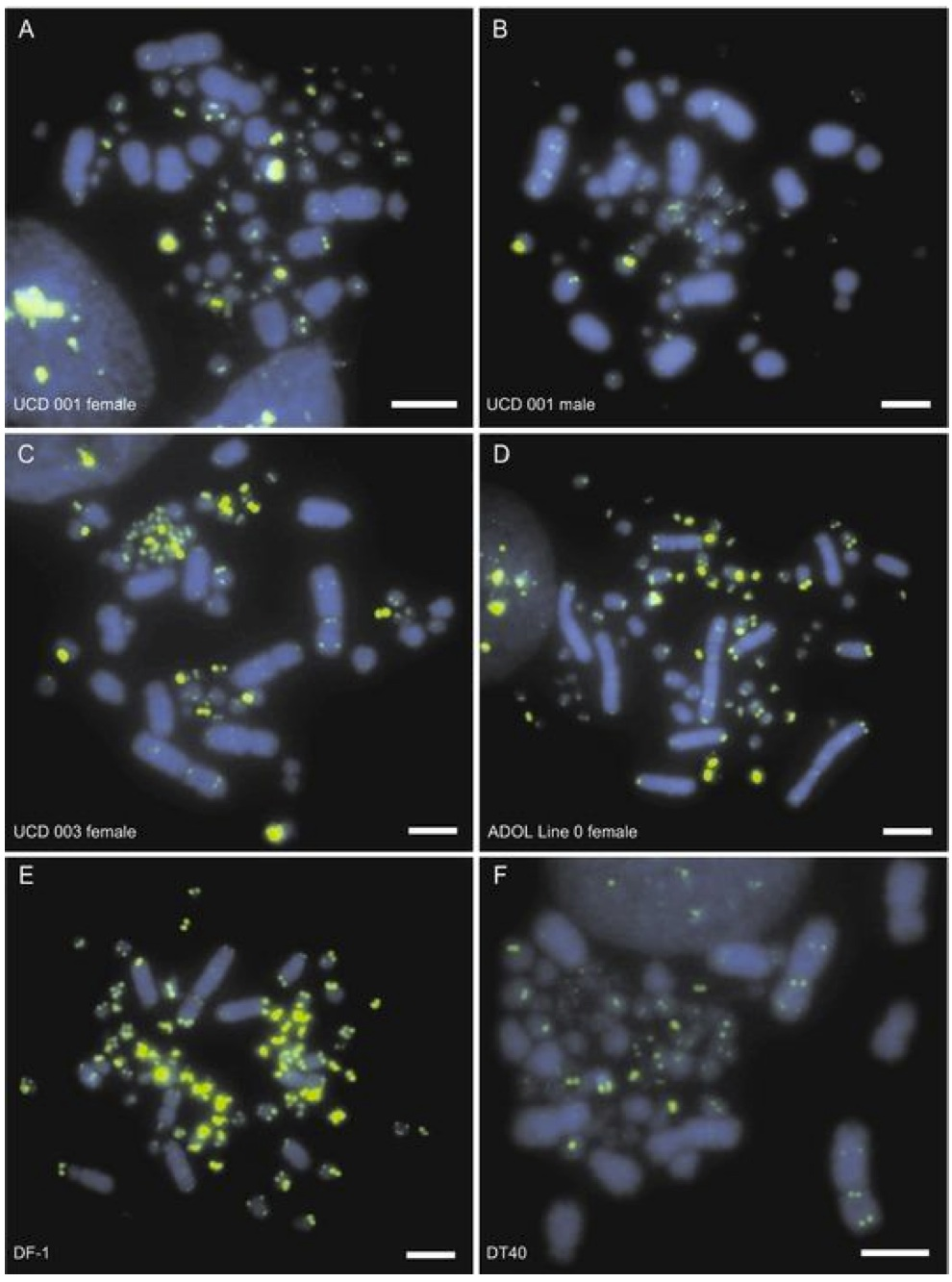
Comparative telomeric array organization within and among diverse chicken genotypes illustrates intra-genomic, inter-individual, and inter-genotype variation

A mega-telomere (also known as an ultra-long telomere or a class III telomere), is an extremely long telomere sequence that sits on the end of chromosomes and prevents the loss of genetic information during cell replication. Like regular telomeres, mega-telomeres are made of a repetitive sequence of DNA and associated proteins, and are located on the ends of chromosomes. However, mega-telomeres are substantially longer than regular telomeres, ranging in size from 50 kilobases to several megabases (for comparison, the normal length of vertebrate telomeres is usually between 10 and 20 kilobases).

Telomeres act like protective caps for the chromosome. During cell division, a cell will make copies of its DNA. The enzymes in the cell that are responsible for copying the DNA cannot copy the very ends of the chromosomes. This is sometimes called the "end replication problem". If a cell did not contain telomeres, genetic information from the DNA on the ends of chromosomes would be lost with each division. However, because chromosomes have telomeres or mega-telomeres on their ends, repetitive non-essential sequences of DNA are lost instead (See: Telomere shortening). While the chromosomes in most eukaryotic organisms are capped with telomeres, mega-telomeres are only found in a few species, such as mice and some birds. The specific function of mega-telomeres in vertebrate cells is still unclear.

== Discovery ==
Telomeric regions of DNA were first identified in the late 1970s (See: Discovery of Telomeric DNA). However, extremely long regions of telomere sequence were not recognized in vertebrates until over a decade later. These sequences, which ranged from 30 to 150 kilobases in size, were first identified in laboratory mice by David Kipling and Howard Cooke in 1990.

In 1994, extremely long telomeric regions were identified in chickens. Telomeric sequences ranging from 20 kilobases to several megabases have also been identified in several species of birds. These large regions were termed "ultra-long" telomeres in the literature when they were identified using southern blotting and "mega-telomeres" when identified by cytogenetic methods. The currently accepted terminology for these sequences is "mega-telomeres"

== Structure and function ==
Mega-telomeres in vertebrates consist of repeats of a six base-pair sequence, TTAGGG, of DNA. Mega-telomeric DNA also binds to various proteins to form complex structures on the ends of chromosomes. Telomeres are identified by telomere arrays. A telomere array is a unique arrangement of telomeres within a sample (cell, individual, etc.) that is defined by the number of sequence repeats, the pattern of fragments given by restriction digest, the chromosome on which it is found, and the specific location of the sequence on that chromosome. In the literature, mega-telomeres are referred to as Class III telomeres based on the characteristics of their arrays.

Many studies in model organisms have established the significance of telomere structure and function in regulating genome stability, cellular aging, and oncogenesis. It has been suggested that mega-teleomeres may serve as protective mechanism against senescence in long-lived organisms. However, there is some debate on the topic, since telomeric length does not seem to affect lifespan in mice and birds with both long and short life-spans have been shown to have mega-telomeres.

The presence of mega-telomeres varies between species. For example, human chromosomes do not have mega-telomeres while mice and many species of birds do. There is also variation in their structure and location within the same species. In mice and birds, mega-telomeres regions are observed to be hypervariable, meaning that there is a high degree of polymorphism in the size and position of mega-telomeres between individuals, including those of highly inbred lines. Analysis of siblings from highly inbred chicken-lines have suggested that these ultra-long telomeric sequences are extremely heterogenous. Similar observations of heterogeneity have also been made in mice.

In birds, whose cells contain microchromosomes, it has been suggested that there was a correlation between the presence of mega-telomeres and the number of microchromosomes present in a species, such that bird genomes with large numbers of microchromosomes also possessed larger amounts of telomeric DNA sequence. It was thought that these telomeric sequences might protect genes on these tiny chromosomes from erosion during cell division. However, subsequent studies showed that mega-telomeres are not necessarily present in all species with microchromosomes, nor are they found on all microchromosomes within a cell. Mega-telomeres are also thought contribute to the high recombination rate of chicken microchromosomes. The longest mega-telomere in chickens is associated with the W (female) chromosome, suggesting that mega-telomeres may also affect sex chromosome organization and the generation of genetic variation.

== Evolutionary origins ==
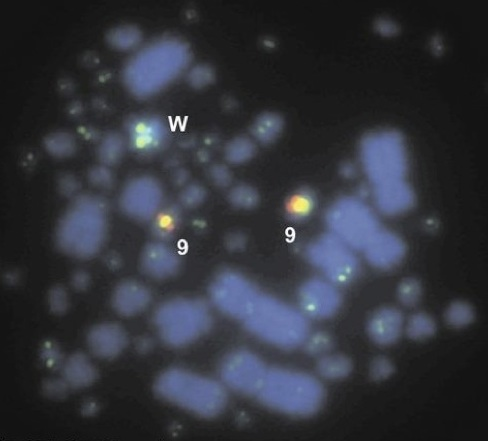
Chromosomal locations of mega-telomeres in an inbred chicken line: GGA (chromosome) 9 and W

The current research exploring mega-telomeres has indicated unexpected heterogeneity and non-Mendelian segregation of mega-telomere profiles between subsequent generations of inbred chicken (Gallus gallus) lines. This heterogeneity or inconsistency from generation to generation, despite nearly identical genomic sequences, is evidence that mega-telomeres promote recombination during meiosis. Furthermore, the preferential location on microchromsomes and the discovery of an extremely large mega-telomere on the female-specific W chromosome of avian species also signify the role of mega-telomeres.

Microchromosomes are known to be gene-dense and particularly susceptible to damage, thus mega-telomeres may act specifically to protect these gene-rich but fragile chromosomes from erosion or other forms of chromosomal damage. The nearly 3MB telomeric array on the W chromosome suggests that mega-telomeres also play a role in sex-chromosome organization or distribution during, meiosis, however a mechanism is yet to be identified. It does not appear that the presence of mega-telomeres in a genome can alter the "telomere clock" or extend an organism's lifespan.

== Organisms with mega-telomeres ==
Mega-telomeres have been best described in vertebrate species, specifically inbred mice and chicken lines. In fact, some of the largest mega-telomere arrays were reported in highly inbred and nearly homozygous chicken lines, including UCD 003 and ADOL Line 0. Normal vertebrate telomere array sizes range from 10 to 20 Kb, however, many genetic lines of mouse and chicken possess extreme 50kb or more telomere size arrays. A few other avian species, including Japanese quail (Coturnix japonica), ostrich (Struthio camelus), and emu (Dromaius novaehollandiae). Although most avian genomes are three times smaller than mammalian genomes, their genomes are enriched with telomeric sequence and class III (mega-telomere) arrays, perhaps due to the relatively large number of microchromosomes.

The presence of mega-telomeres may be enhanced by the process of domestication or development of highly inbred vertebrate lines. The largest chicken arrays were discovered in the most inbred genetic lines. Studies of full siblings and their progeny from the UCD 003 line, established in 1956 and maintained by full-sibling matings, established a consistent profile with 200 Kb or larger telomeres. However, less inbred Red jungle fowl families (the hypothesized ancestor of chickens) have slightly shorter Class II arrays and other avian species, such as the American bald eagle (Haliaeetus leucocephalus), the northern goshawk (Accipter gentilis), possess fewer mega-telomeres and have a considerably smaller telomere size range. Furthermore, laboratory inbred mouse strains (Mus musculus) exhibit extremely long telomeres of 30–150 Kb in length, however the wild mouse species (Mus spretus) has significantly shorter telomeres ranging from 5–15 Kb.

== Identification methods ==
A variety of cytogenetic and molecular methods have been utilized to identify and study mega-telomeres in vertebrate species. Many of these techniques allow researchers to both discover the presence of a mega-telomere in a genome but also to characterize telomere arrays.

Cytogenetic studies employ fluorescence in situ hybridization (FISH) with telomeric probes to label telomeres on chemically-treated cells fixed to glass slides. More specifically, telomere-peptide nucleic acid fluorescein probes are frequently used to identify telomeric sequence repeats on mitotic metaphase and interphase or meiotic pachytene-stage chromosomes. FISH images allow both the identification of mega-telomeric chromosomes and the visualization of chromosome structure, GC-rich DNA regions, and, depending on the experiment, co-localization with genetic regions or genes.

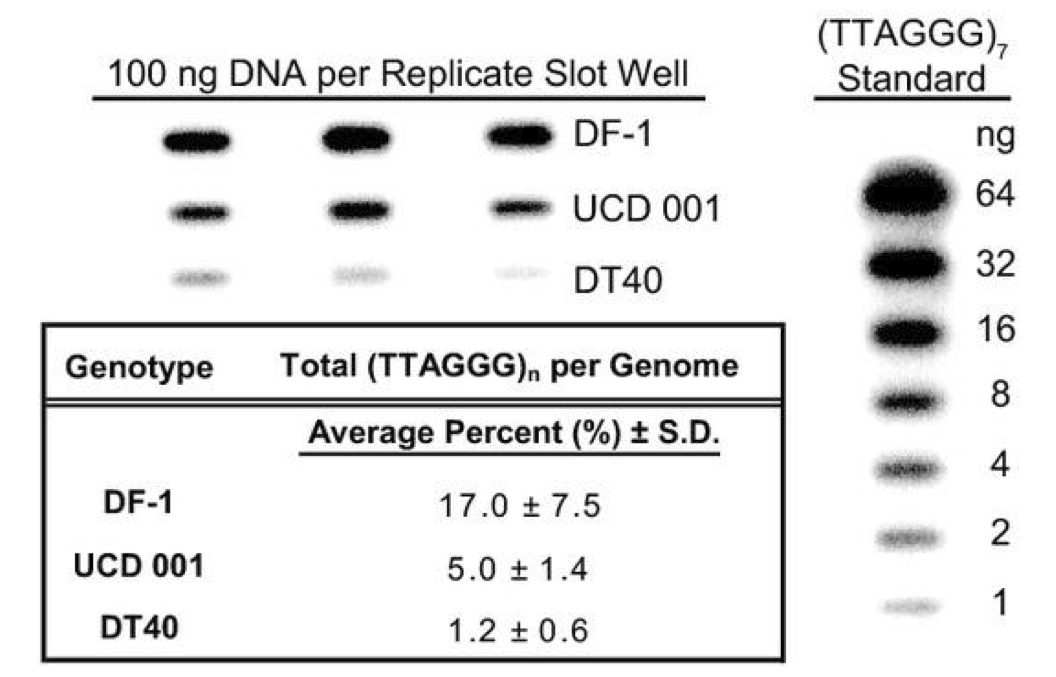
Slot blot method of analysis can be utilized to determine the total amount of telomeric sequence per genome (inclusive of interstitial and terminal arrays)

Molecular techniques for quantifying telomeric sequences include pulse-field gel electrophoresis (PFGE), slot blot, horizontal gel electrophoresis, and Contour-clamped homogeneous electric field pulse field gel electrophoresis (CHEF-PFGE). In these techniques, purified genomic DNA is isolated and digested with restriction enzymes, such as HaeIII, HinfI, AluI, Sau3AI, EcoRI, EcoRV, PstI, SstI, BamHI, HindIII or BglII, and quantified by fluorometry.

The digestion of DNA into smaller fragments by restriction enzymes, separation of variable-sized DNA fragments via electrophoresis, and labeling of fragments containing telomeric DNA using a specific radio- or fluorescently-labeled probe are the essential steps completed within many molecular techniques. In many cases, the DNA fragments are transferred to distinctive membranes before labeling via blotting techniques (i.e. Southern blot). Specialized protocols have demonstrated the ability to isolate high molecular weight Class III telomeric DNA from Class I and II fragments as well as characterize the size ranges found within each class. The pattern of the telomeric fragments on the stained or labeled membrane is typically unique to the DNA sample (i.e. telomere arrays are rarely identical). Molecular weight markers are usually separated via electrophoresis through agarose gel along with genomic DNA fragments to aid in sizing telomeric arrays and identifying array inter- and intra- individual variability. Slot blot, however, is conducted without DNA fragmentation or separation, rather whole genomic DNA is used to quantify the total concentration of telomeric DNA. The flaw of this technique is that the size of the labelled DNA molecules cannot be identified. In slot blot (or dot blot), total genomic DNA is attached to a membrane and labeled with a telomere-probe that produces a sample-specific chemiluminescence signal, which is captured and quantified by fluorometer equipment and software. A known concentration standard must be labeled and quantified simultaneously in order to accurately determine the telomeric sequence concentration in the DNA samples.
