= List of mammals of Ceuta, Melilla and the Plazas de Soberanía =

Ceuta, Melilla and the Plazas de Soberanía are territories under Spanish sovereignty in or off the coast of Northern Africa. Mammals recorded in these territories and their conservation status are listed below. The taxonomy and naming of the individual species is based on those used in existing Wikipedia articles as of 21 May 2007 and supplemented by the common names and taxonomy from the IUCN, Smithsonian Institution, or University of Michigan where no Wikipedia article was available.

The following tags are used to highlight each species' conservation status as assessed by the International Union for Conservation of Nature.

EX	Extinct	No reasonable doubt that the last individual has died.
EW	Extinct in the wild	Known only to survive in captivity or as a naturalized populations well outside its previous range.
CR	Critically endangered	The species is in imminent risk of extinction in the wild.
EN	Endangered	The species is facing an extremely high risk of extinction in the wild.
VU	Vulnerable	The species is facing a high risk of extinction in the wild.
NT	Near threatened	The species does not meet any of the criteria that would categorise it as risking extinction but it is likely to do so in the future.
LC	Least concern	There are no current identifiable risks to the species.
DD	Data deficient	There is inadequate information to make an assessment of the risks to this species.

Some species were assessed using an earlier set of criteria. Species assessed using this system have the following instead of near threatened and least concern categories:

LR/cd	Lower risk/conservation dependent	Species which were the focus of conservation programmes and may have moved into a higher risk category if that programme was discontinued.
LR/nt	Lower risk/near threatened	Species which are close to being classified as vulnerable but are not the subject of conservation programmes.
LR/lc	Lower risk/least concern	Species for which there are no identifiable risks.

== Subclass: Theria ==
=== Infraclass: Eutheria ===
==== Order: Macroscelidea (elephant shrews) ====
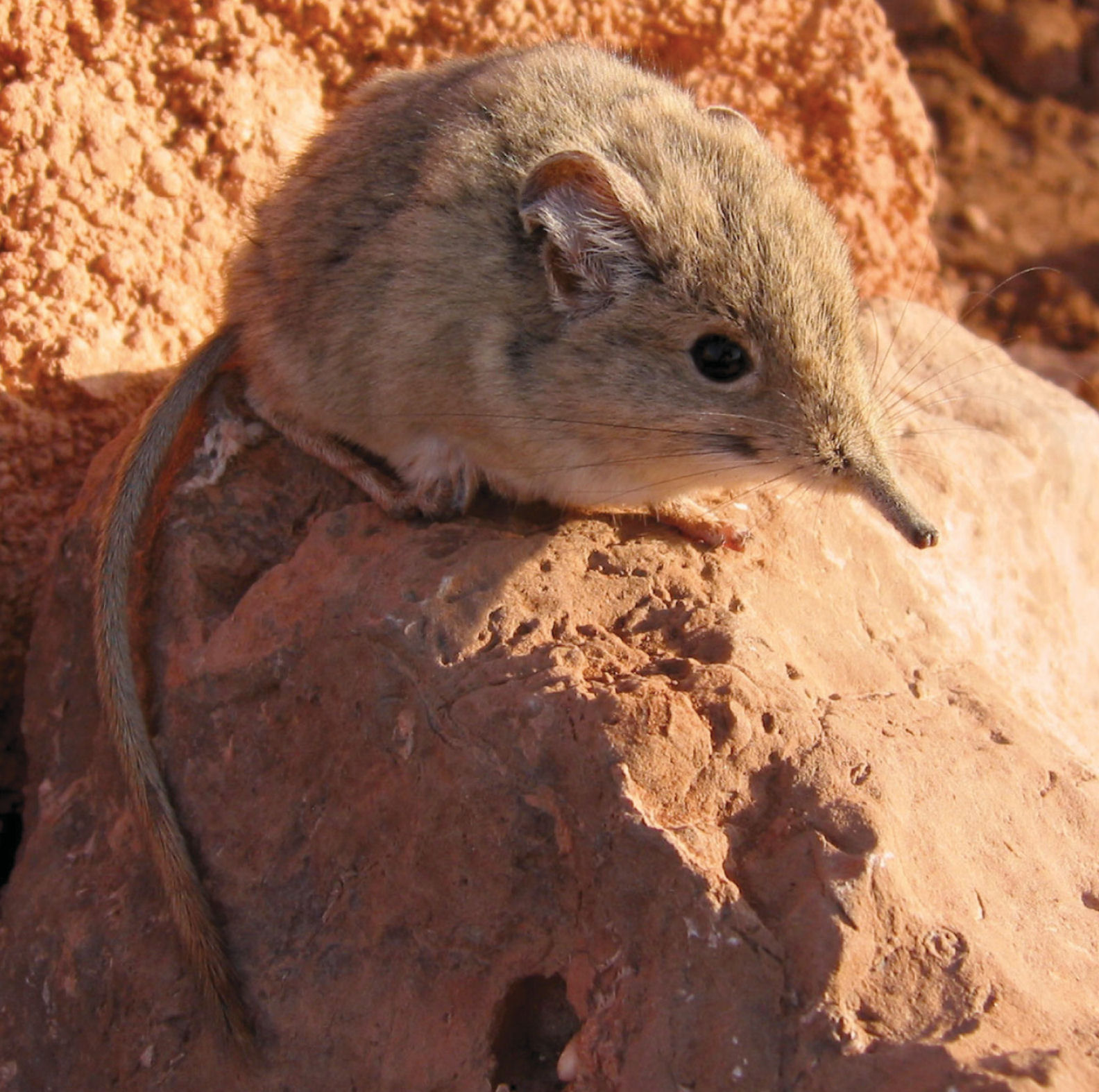
North African elephant shrew

Elephant shrews are small insectivorous mammals native to Africa and members of the superorder Afrotheria. Their name derives from their elongated noses resembling the trunks of elephants, to whom they are distantly related.

- Family: Macroscelididae
  - Genus: Elephantulus
    - North African elephant shrew, E. rozeti LC

==== Order: Rodentia (rodents) ====
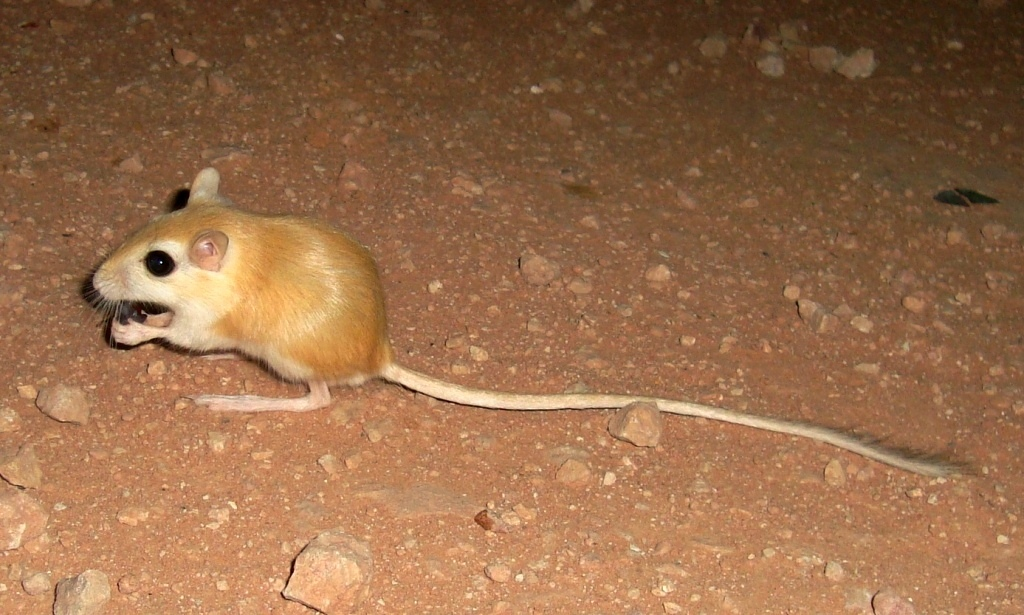
North African gerbil

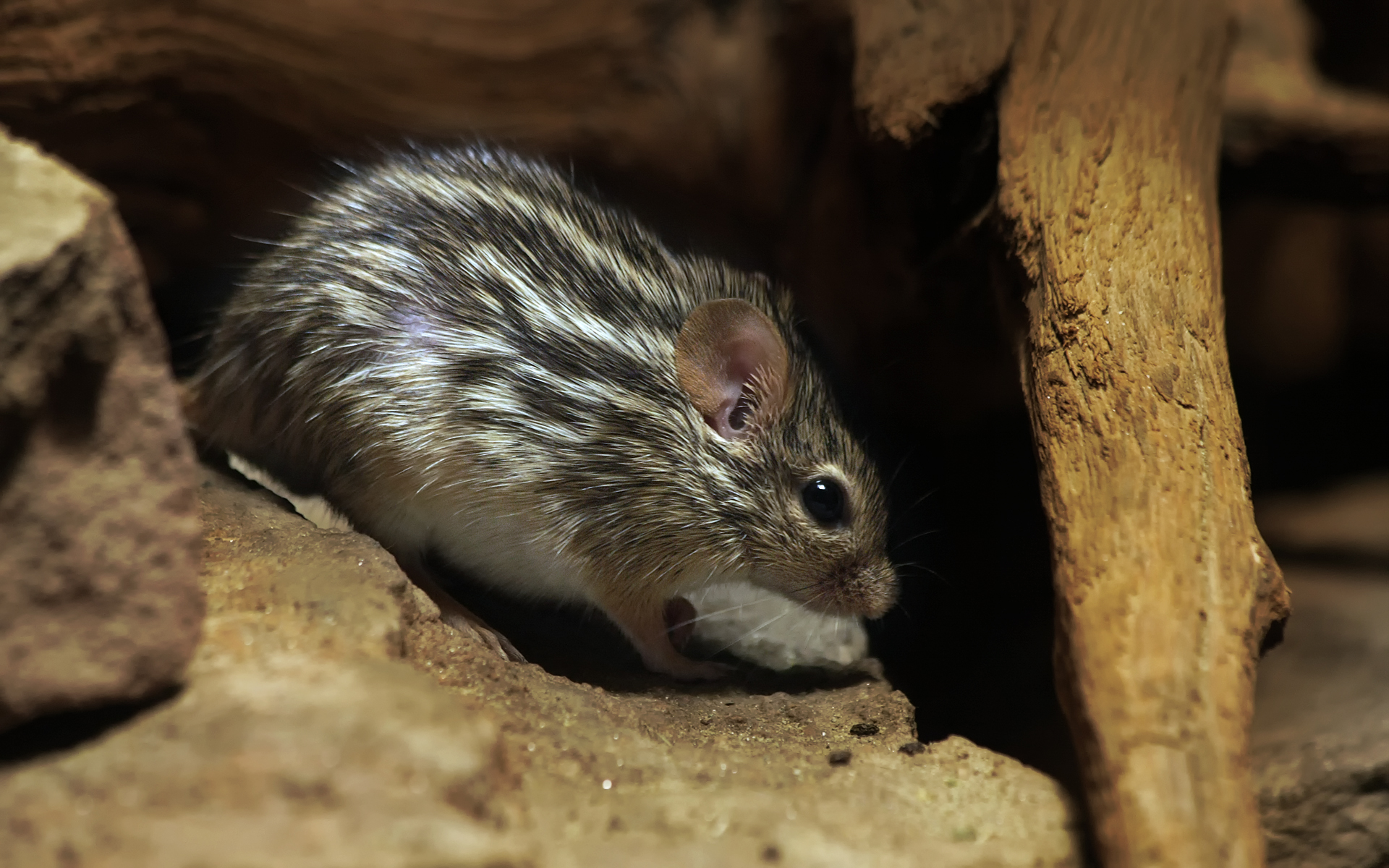
Barbary striped grass mouse

Rodents make up the largest order of mammals, with over 40% of mammalian species. They have two incisors in the upper and lower jaw which grow continually and must be kept short by gnawing. Most rodents are small though the capybara can weigh up to 45 kg (99 lb).

- Suborder: Sciurognathi
  - Family: Gliridae (dormice)
    - Subfamily: Leithiinae
      - Genus: Eliomys
        - Maghreb garden dormouse, Eliomys munbyanus LC
- Suborder: Myomorpha
  - Family: Cricetidae (hamsters, voles, lemmings)
  - Family: Muridae (mice and rats)
    - Subfamily: Gerbillinae
      - Genus: Dipodillus
        - North African gerbil, Dipodillus campestris LC
    - Subfamily: Murinae
      - Genus: Apodemus
        - Wood mouse, Apodemus sylvaticus LC
      - Genus: Lemniscomys
        - Barbary striped grass mouse, Lemniscomys barbarus LC
      - Genus: Mus
        - House mouse, Mus musculus LR/lc
        - Algerian mouse, Mus spretus LC
      - Genus: Rattus
        - Black rat, Rattus rattus LR/lc
        - Brown rat, Rattus norvegicus LR/lc

==== Order: Lagomorpha (lagomorphs) ====
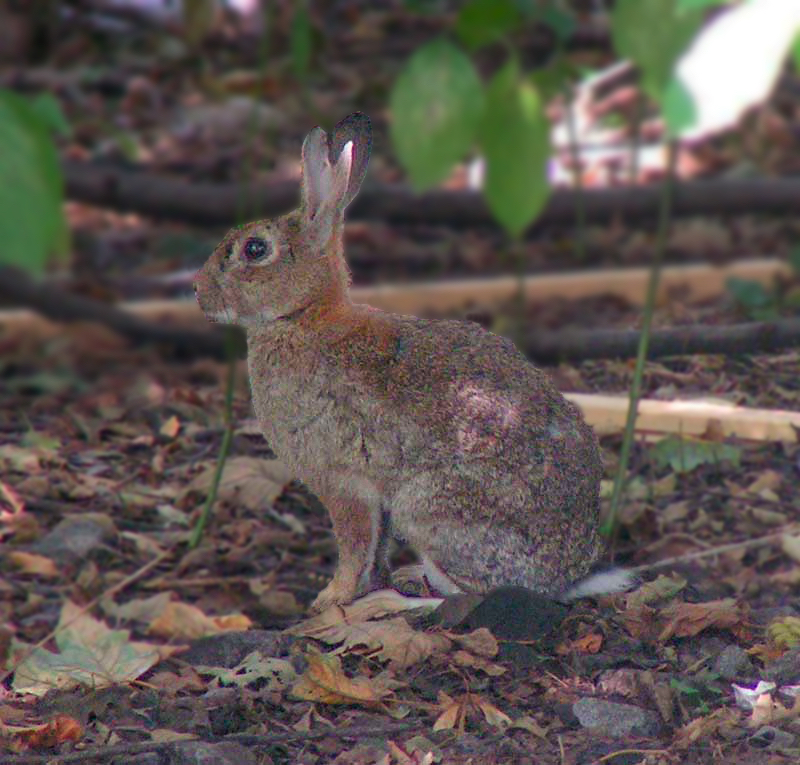
European rabbit

The lagomorphs comprise two families, Leporidae (hares and rabbits), and Ochotonidae (pikas). Though they can resemble rodents, and were classified as a superfamily in that order until the early 20th century, they have since been considered a separate order. They differ from rodents in a number of physical characteristics, such as having four incisors in the upper jaw rather than two.

- Family: Leporidae (rabbits, hares)
  - Genus: Oryctolagus
    - European rabbit, Oryctolagus cuniculus LR/lc VU
  - Genus: Lepus
    - Moroccan hare, Lepus schlumbergheri

==== Order: Erinaceomorpha (hedgehogs and gymnures) ====
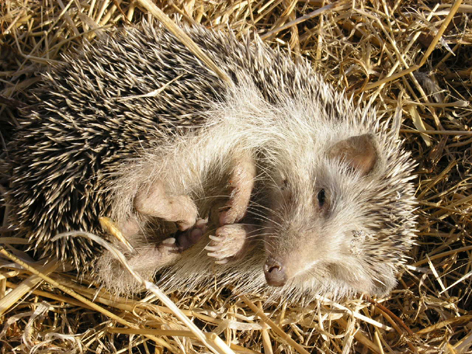
North African hedgehog

The order Erinaceomorpha contains a single family, Erinaceidae, which comprise the hedgehogs and gymnures. The hedgehogs are easily recognised by their spines while gymnures look more like large rats.

- Family: Erinaceidae (hedgehogs)
  - Subfamily: Erinaceinae
    - Genus: Atelerix
      - North African hedgehog, Atelerix algirus LR/lc

==== Order: Soricomorpha (shrews, moles, and solenodons) ====
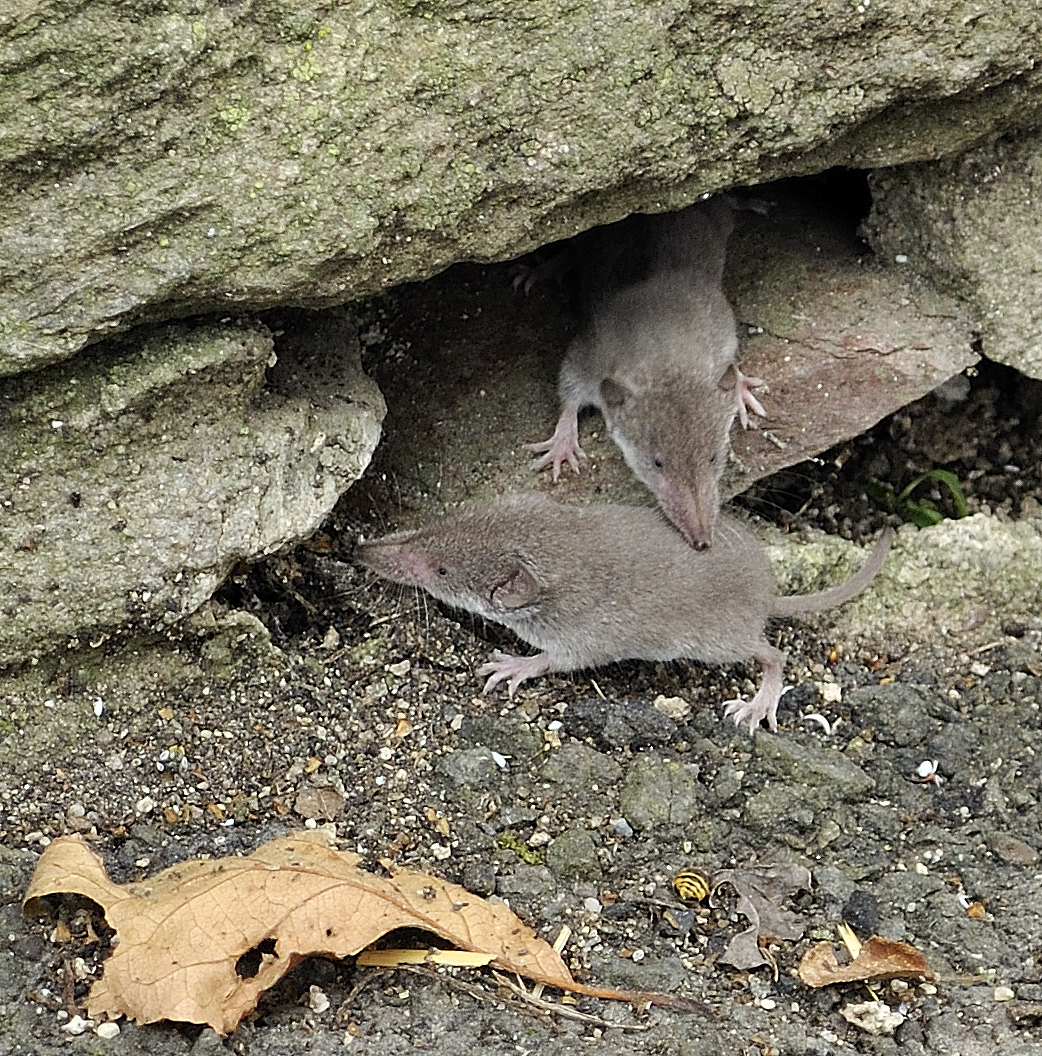
Greater white-toothed shrew

The "shrew-forms" are insectivorous mammals. The shrews and solenodons closely resemble mice while the moles are stout bodied burrowers.

- Family: Soricidae (shrews)
  - Subfamily: Crocidurinae
    - Genus: Crocidura
      - Greater white-toothed shrew, Crocidura russula LC
      - Whitaker's shrew, Crocidura whitakeri LC

==== Order: Chiroptera (bats) ====
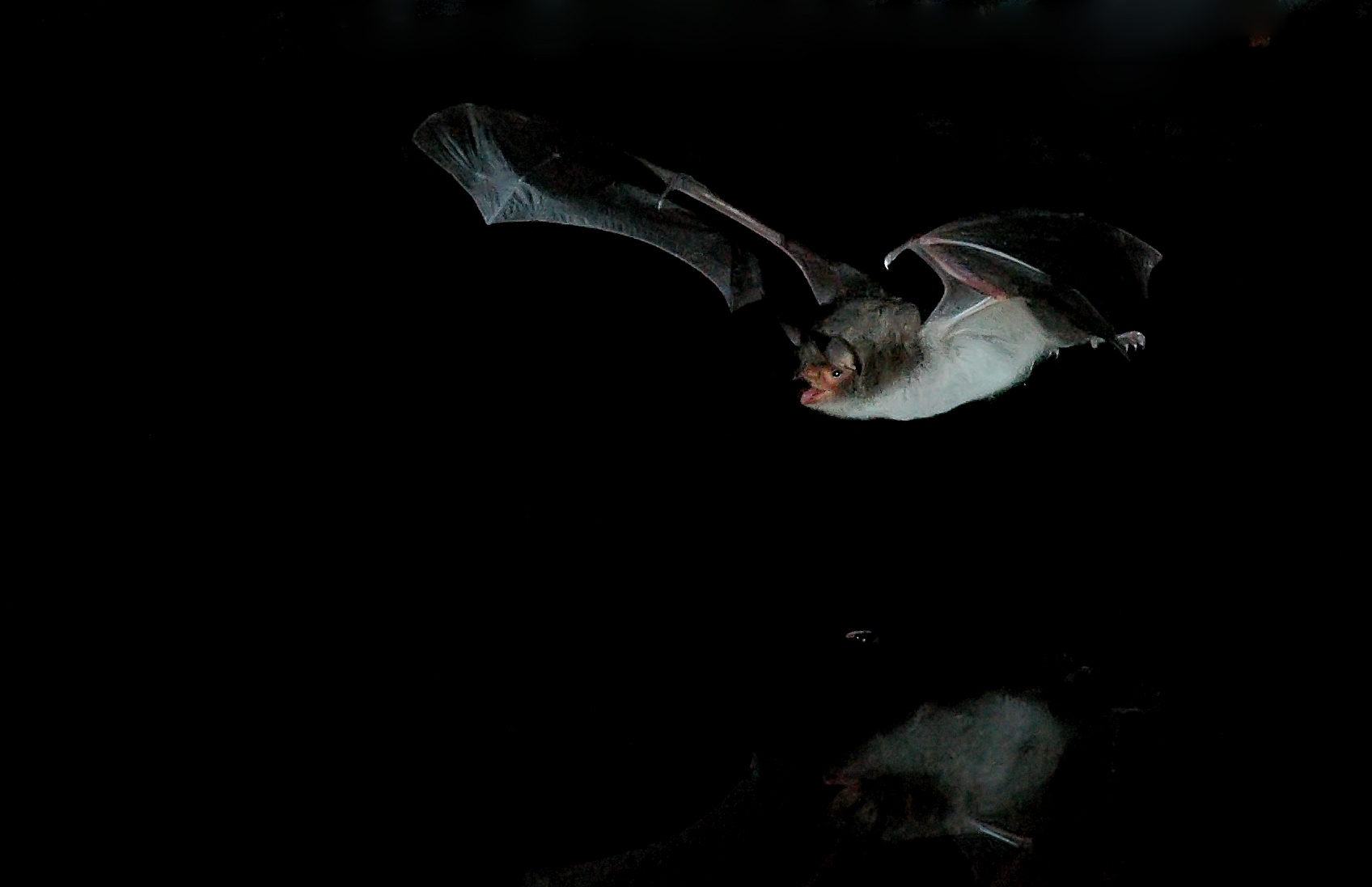
Long-fingered bat

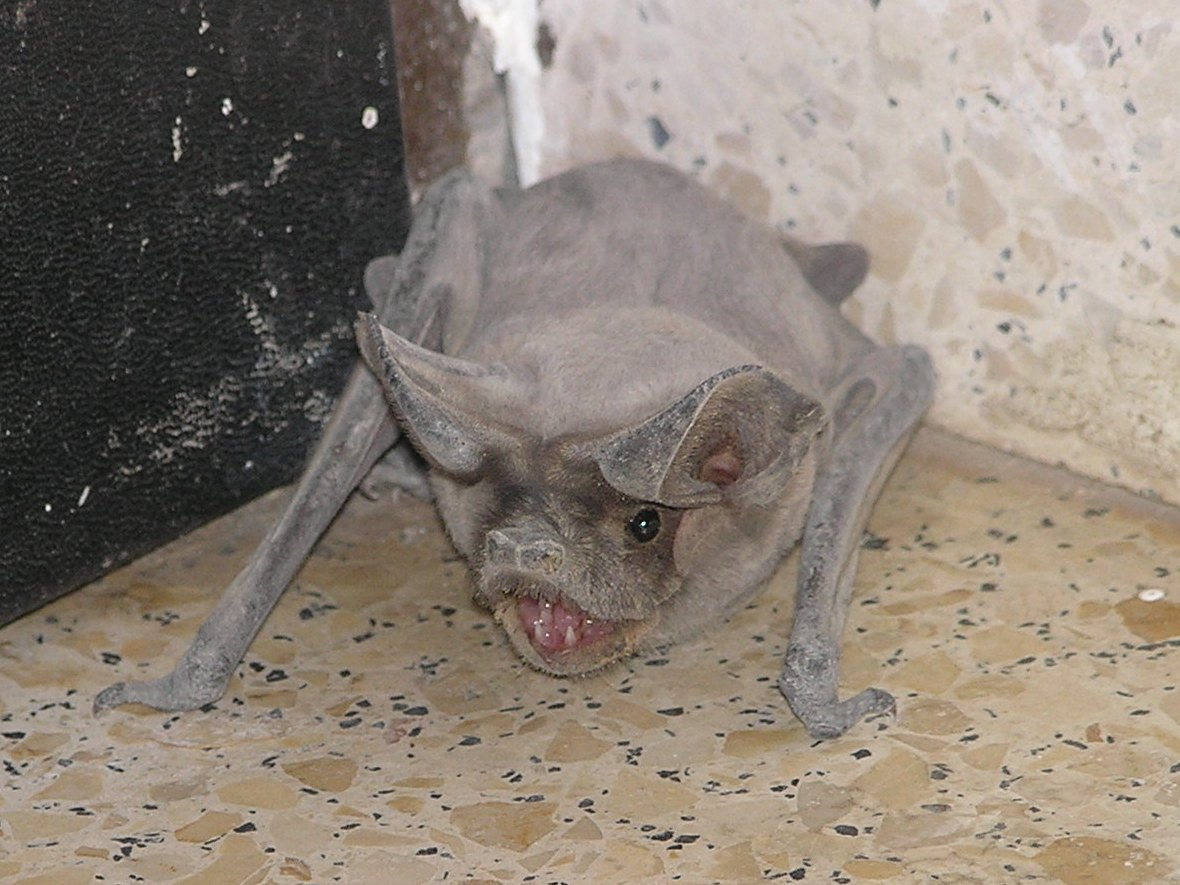
European free-tailed bat

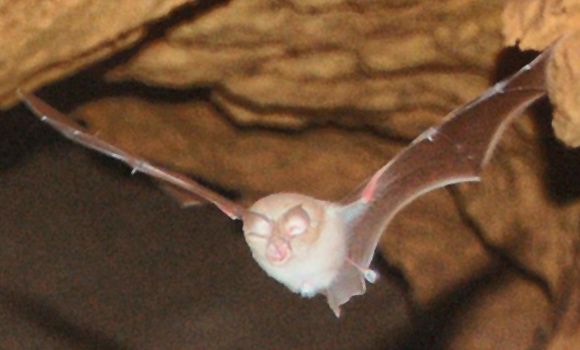
Mediterranean horseshoe bat

The bats' most distinguishing feature is that their forelimbs are developed as wings, making them the only mammals capable of flight. Bat species account for about 20% of all mammals.

- Suborder: Microchiroptera
  - Family: Vespertilionidae
    - Subfamily: Myotinae
      - Genus: Myotis
        - Long-fingered bat, Myotis capaccinii VU
        - Geoffroy's bat, Myotis emarginatus VU
        - Felten's myotis, Myotis punicus DD
    - Subfamily: Vespertilioninae
      - Genus: Barbastella
        - Barbastelle, Barbastella barbastellus VU
      - Genus: Eptesicus
        - Mediterranean serotine bat Eptesicus isabellinus DD
        - Serotine bat, Eptesicus serotinus LR/lc
      - Genus: Hypsugo
        - Savi's pipistrelle, Hypsugo savii LR/lc
      - Genus: Nyctalus
        - Greater noctule bat, Nyctalus lasiopterus LR/nt
        - Lesser noctule, Nyctalus leisleri LR/nt
      - Genus: Pipistrellus
        - Kuhl's pipistrelle, Pipistrellus kuhlii LC
        - Common pipistrelle, Pipistrellus pipistrellus LC
    - Subfamily: Miniopterinae
      - Genus: Miniopterus
        - Schreibers' long-fingered bat, Miniopterus schreibersii LC VU
  - Family: Molossidae
    - Genus: Tadarida
      - European free-tailed bat, Tadarida teniotis LR/lc NT
  - Family: Rhinolophidae
    - Subfamily: Rhinolophinae
      - Genus: Rhinolophus
        - Mediterranean horseshoe bat, Rhinolophus euryale VU
        - Greater horseshoe bat, Rhinolophus ferrumequinum NT
        - Lesser horseshoe bat, Rhinolophus hipposideros LC NT
        - Mehely's horseshoe bat, Rhinolophus mehelyi VU EN

==== Order: Cetacea (whales) ====
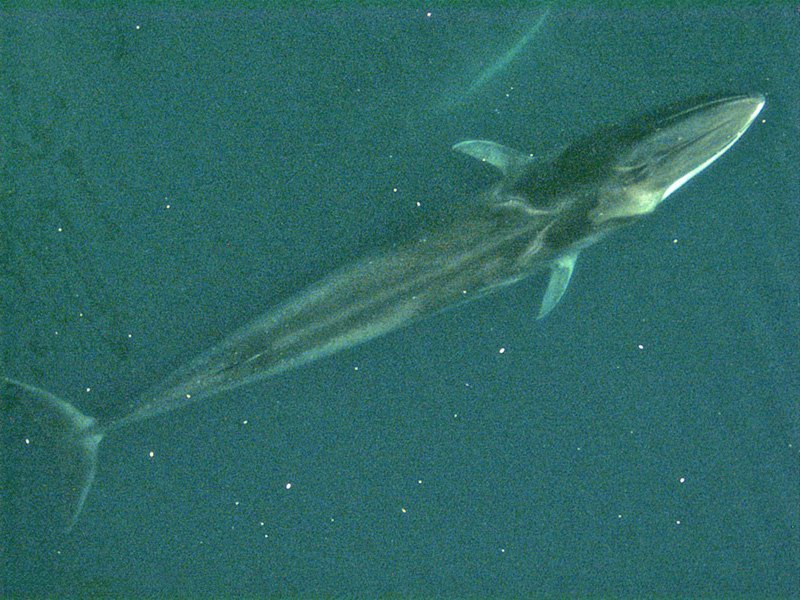
Fin whale

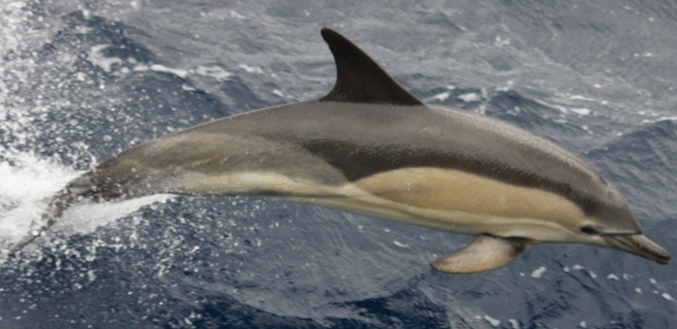
Common dolphin

Orcas

The order Cetacea includes whales, dolphins and porpoises. They are the mammals most fully adapted to aquatic life with a spindle-shaped nearly hairless body, protected by a thick layer of blubber, and forelimbs and tail modified to provide propulsion underwater.

- Suborder: Mysticeti
  - Family: Balaenopteridae (rorquals)
    - Genus: Balaenoptera
      - Fin whale, Balaenoptera physalus EN
- Suborder: Odontoceti
  - Family: Delphinidae (marine dolphins)
    - Genus: Delphinus
      - Short-beaked common dolphin, Delphinus delphis LR/l
    - Genus: Feresa
      - Pygmy killer whale, Feresa attenuata DD
    - Genus: Globicephala
      - Pilot whale, Globicephala melas LR/lc
    - Genus: Grampus
      - Risso's dolphin, Grampus griseus DD
    - Genus: Orcinus
      - Orca, Orcinus orca LR/cd
    - Genus: Pseudorca
      - False killer whale, Pseudorca crassidens LR/lc
    - Genus: Stenella
      - Striped dolphin, Stenella coeruleoalba LR/cd
    - Genus: Tursiops
      - Common bottlenose dolphin, Tursiops truncatus LR/lc
  - Family: Phocoenidae (porpoises)
    - Genus: Phocoena
      - Harbour porpoise, Phocoena phocoena VU
  - Family: Physeteridae (sperm whales)
    - Genus: Physeter
      - Sperm whale, Physeter macrocephalus VU
  - Family: Ziphiidae (beaked whales)
    - Genus: Ziphius
      - Cuvier's beaked whale, Ziphius cavirostris DD

==== Order: Carnivora (carnivorans) ====
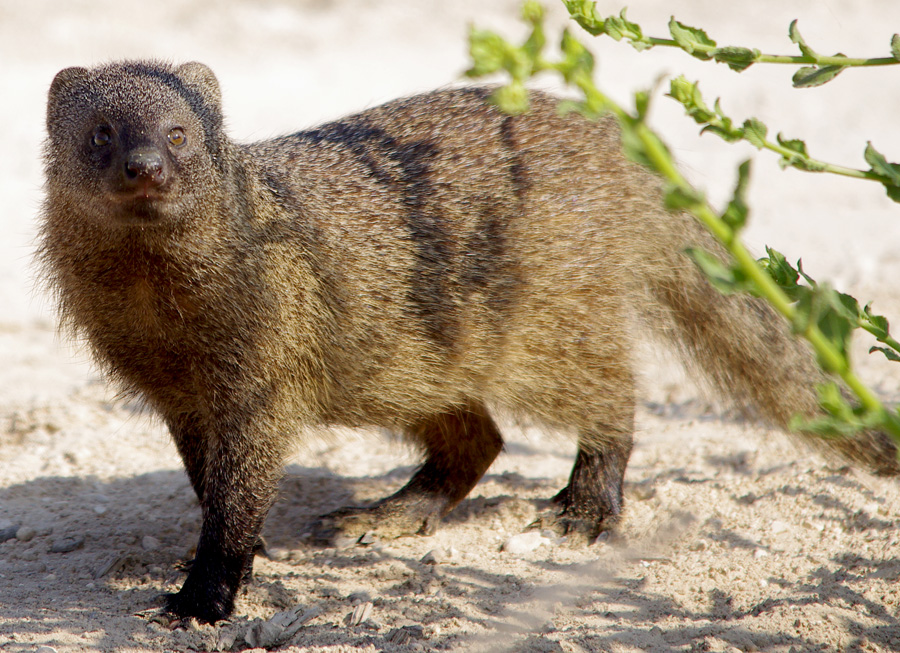
Egyptian mongoose

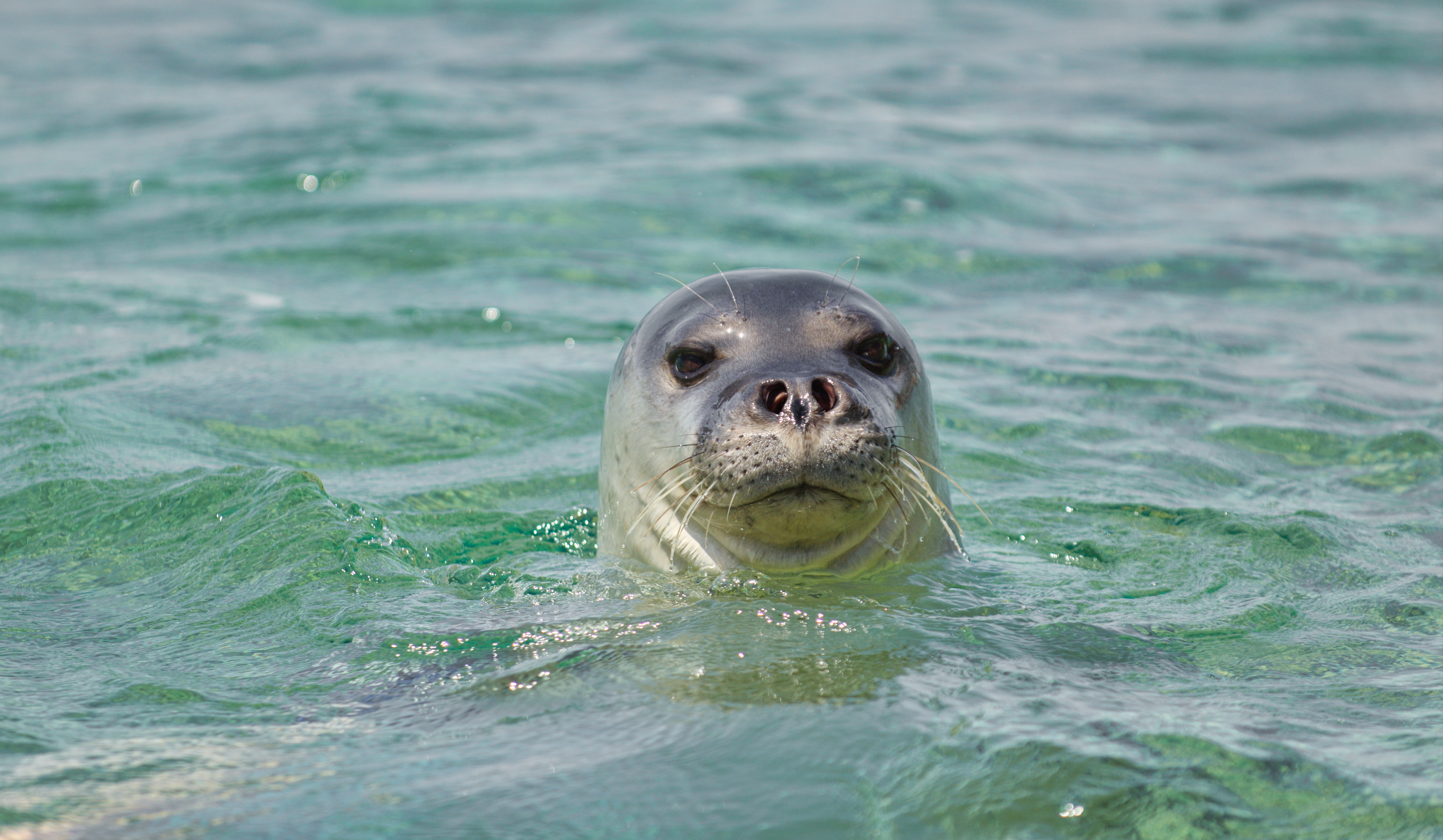
Mediterranean monk seal

There are over 260 species of carnivorans, the majority of which feed primarily on meat. They have a characteristic skull shape and dentition.

- Suborder: Feliformia
  - Family: Viverridae (civets)
    - Subfamily: Viverrinae
      - Genus: Genetta
        - Common genet, Genetta genetta LR/lc
  - Family: Herpestidae (mongooses)
    - Genus: Herpestes
      - Egyptian mongoose, Herpestes ichneumon LR/lc
- Suborder: Caniformia
  - Family: Canidae (dogs, foxes)
    - Genus: Vulpes
      - Red fox, Vulpes vulpes LC
  - Family: Mustelidae (mustelids)
    - Genus: Mustela
      - Least weasel, Mustela nivalis LR/lc
  - Family: Phocidae (earless seals)
    - Genus: Monachus
      - Mediterranean monk seal, Monachus monachus CR

==== Order: Artiodactyla (even-toed ungulates) ====
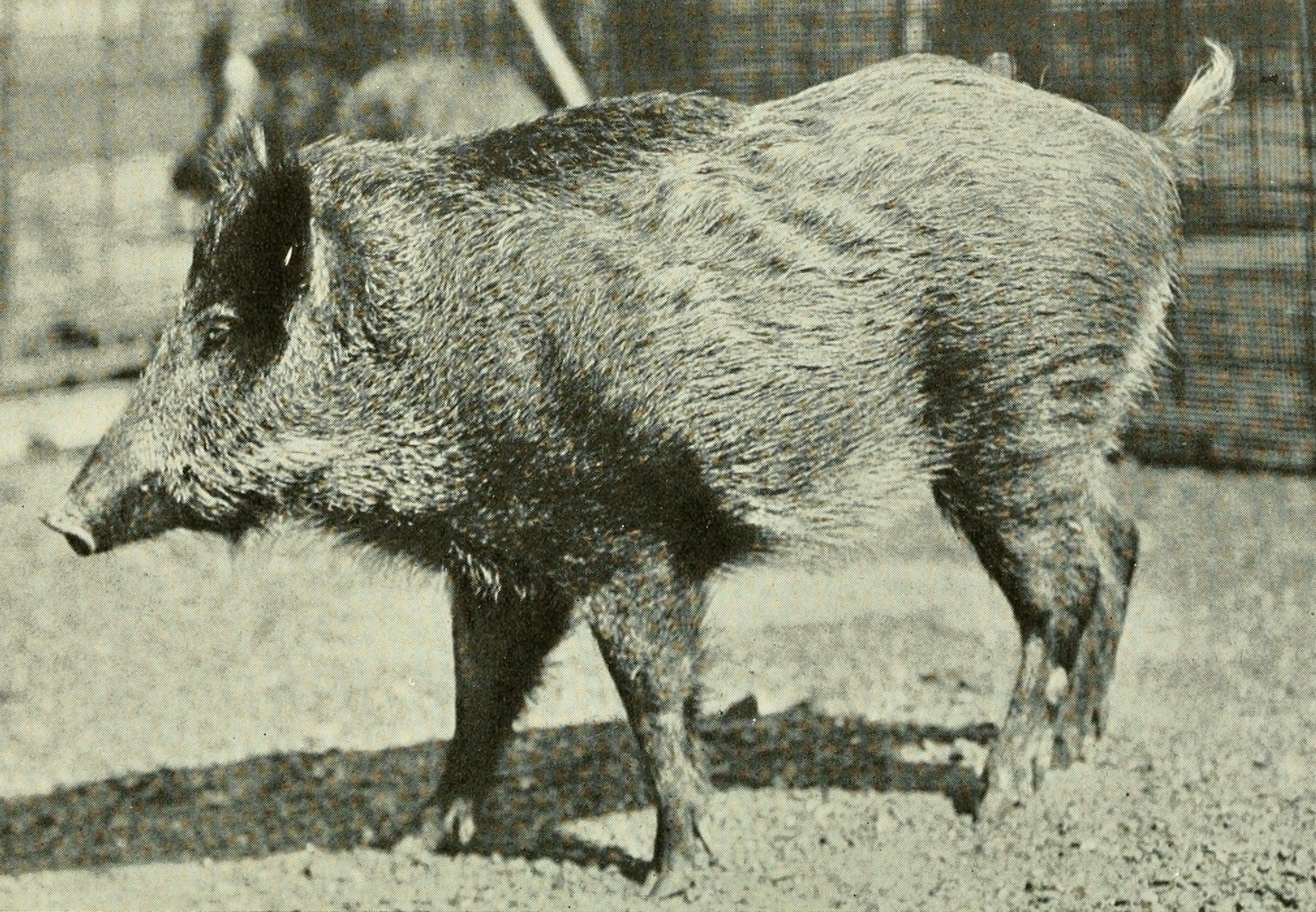
North African boar

The even-toed ungulates are ungulates whose weight is borne about equally by the third and fourth toes, rather than mostly or entirely by the third as in perissodactyls. There are about 220 artiodactyl species, including many that are of great economic importance to humans.

- Family: Suidae (pigs)
  - Subfamily: Suinae
    - Genus: Sus
      - Wild boar, Sus scrofa LR/lc
        - North African boar, Sus scrofa algira

== Locally extinct ==
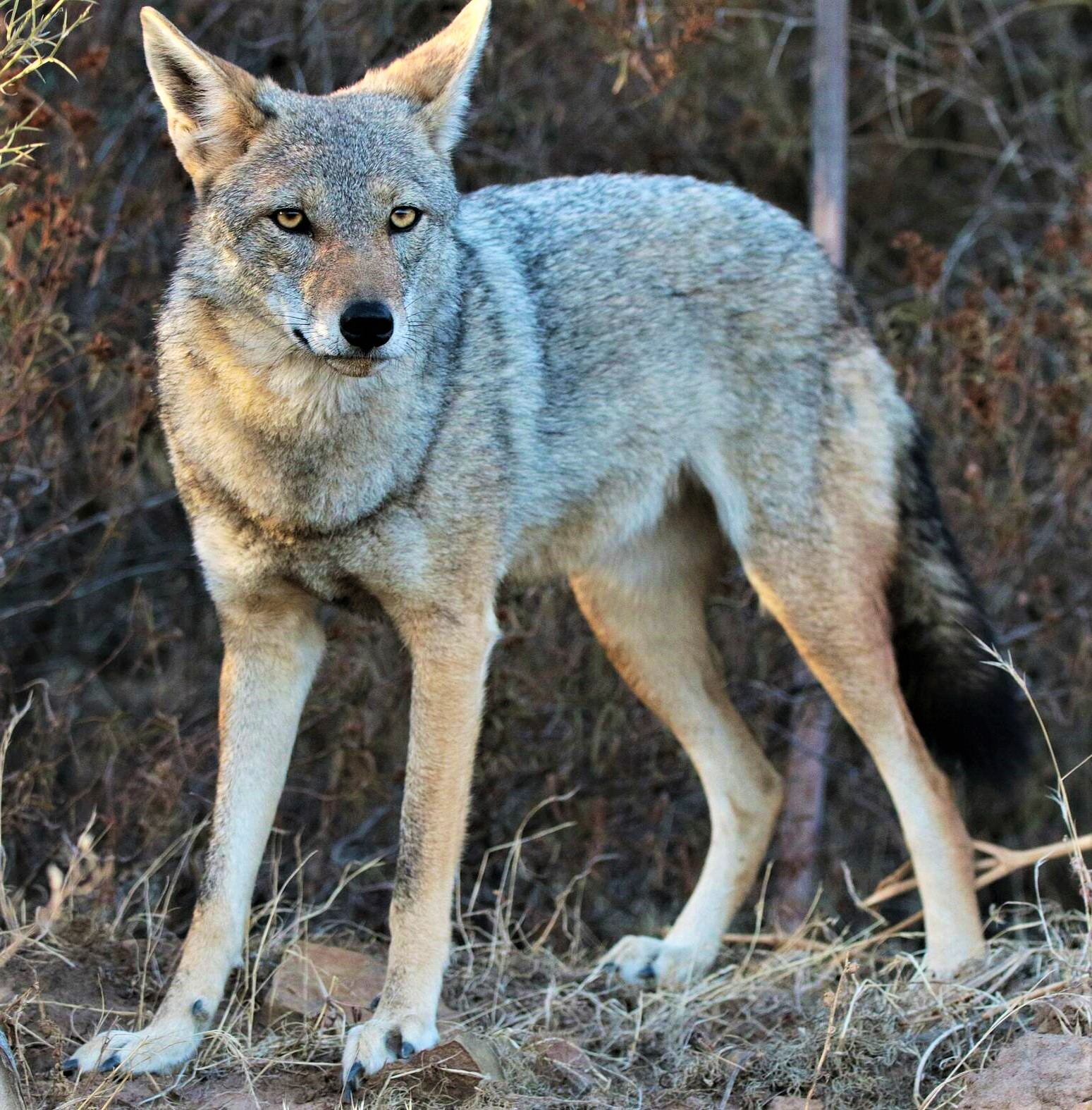
African wolf.

The following species are locally extinct in the area but continue to exist elsewhere:

- African wolf, Canis lupaster
- Gray whale, Eschrichtius robustus
- North Atlantic right whale, Eubalaena glacialis
- African wildcat, Felis lybica LC
- Crested porcupine, Hystrix cristata LC

== See also ==
- List of chordate orders
- Lists of mammals by region
- List of prehistoric mammals
- Mammal classification
- List of mammals described in the 2000s
