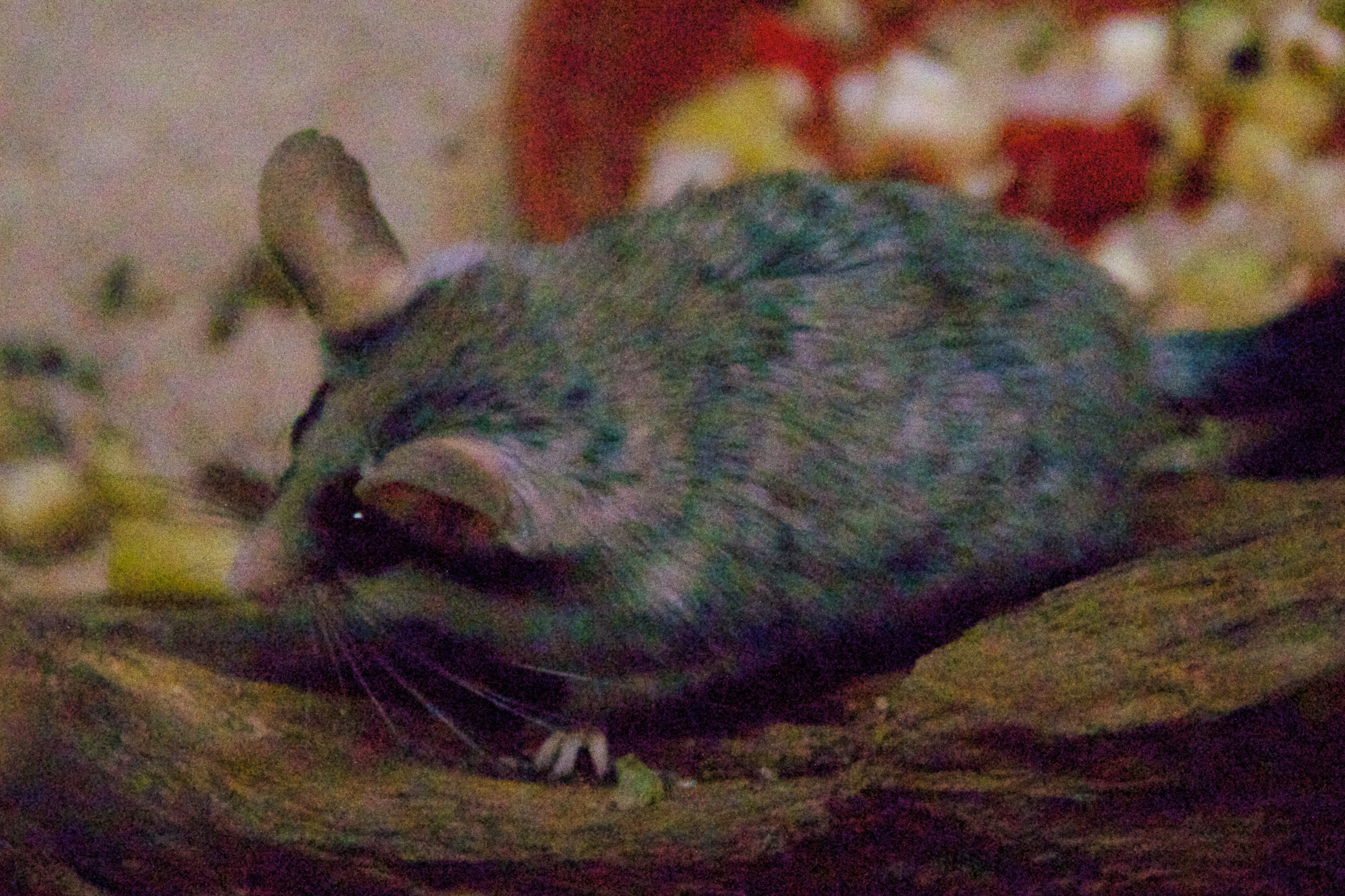

Conservation status
- Least Concern (IUCN 3.1)

Scientific classification
- Kingdom: Animalia
- Phylum: Chordata
- Class: Mammalia
- Order: Rodentia
- Family: Gliridae
- Genus: Eliomys
- Species: E. melanurus

Binomial name
- Eliomys melanurus (Wagner, 1840)

= Asian garden dormouse =

Species of rodent

The Asian garden dormouse or large-eared garden dormouse (Eliomys melanurus) is a species of rodent in the family Gliridae. It is found in Egypt, Iraq, Israel, Jordan, Lebanon, Libya, Saudi Arabia, Syria and Turkey. Its natural habitats are temperate forests, subtropical or tropical dry shrubland, Mediterranean-type shrubby vegetation, rocky areas and gardens.

It is active throughout the year but can enter a state of torpor. Diet consists mainly of insects, snails, centipedes and geckos but as an omnivore, it will also eat plant matter. It is a common species and the International Union for Conservation of Nature has assessed its conservation status as being of "least concern".

== Taxonomy ==
This species was first described in 1840 by the German zoologist Johann Andreas Wagner who placed it in the genus Myoxus. It was later transferred to Eliomys. Originally thought to extend as far west as Morocco, it was considered to be a synonym of Eliomys quercinus, the garden dormouse. More recently E. melanurus sensu lato has been split, western populations in Morocco, Algeria and Tunisia being assigned to E quercinus, while eastern populations were assigned to E. melanurus, distributed across Libya, Egypt, Saudi Arabia and the Near East. Since then, the North African population of E. quercinus has been recognised as a separate species, Eliomys munbyanus, the Maghreb garden dormouse.

== Description ==
The Asian garden dormouse is a moderate-sized species with a head-and-body length of 111 to 144 mm (4.4 to 5.7 in) and a tail of 100 to 136 mm (3.9 to 5.4 in). The dorsal fur is soft, and sometimes woolly, yellowish-grey, yellowish-brown or reddish-brown. The underparts and hind feet are white or cream, sometimes tinged with grey, and clearly delineated from the dorsal pelage. The head is paler at the muzzle but otherwise matches the dorsal colouring. The cheeks are cream, and a dark diagonal streak passes through the large eyes. The ears are large and oval, and behind them are several, often inconspicuous, pale patches. The tail has short hairs near the base and longer hairs near the tip; at its root, both the upper and lower surfaces match the dorsal colouring, and the rest of the tail is black, sometimes with a little white at the tip.

== Distribution and habitat ==
The Asian garden dormouse occurs in North Africa and the Near East. Its range extends from northern Libya and Egypt to Iraq, Syria, Israel, Jordan, Lebanon, Saudi Arabia and southern Turkey. Suitable habitat includes coastal dunes, sandy plateaus, arid steppes, shrubland, subtropical dry woodland, mountainsides, escarpments, rocky areas and limestone cliffs. Sometimes individuals are found in gardens, occasionally in houses and one was once found in a Bedouin tent. It occurs from near sea level up to about 2,850 m (9,350 ft), even living above the snowline in winter.

== Ecology ==
This dormouse is mainly nocturnal, and forages both on the ground and in trees. It feeds on insects and other invertebrates, as well as small vertebrates. It is active throughout the year, but may at times enter a state of torpor, which may last for several days; the basal metabolic rate is relatively low, and the torpor helps the animal to conserve energy. Little is known of its social behaviour, but animals caught from the wild are said to be very aggressive. Reproduction occurs in spring, the gestation period is 22 days and litters of about three young have been recorded. The skeletal remains of this dormouse have been found in the regurgitated pellets of barn owls and long-eared owls.

== Status ==
The Asian garden dormouse has a wide range and is a common species. No particular threats have been identified, so the International Union for Conservation of Nature has rated its conservation status as being of "least concern".

== Bibliography ==
- Holden, M. E.. 2005. Family Gliridae. pp. 819–841 in Mammal Species of the World a Taxonomic and Geographic Reference. D. E. Wilson and D. M. Reeder eds. Johns Hopkins University Press, Baltimore.
