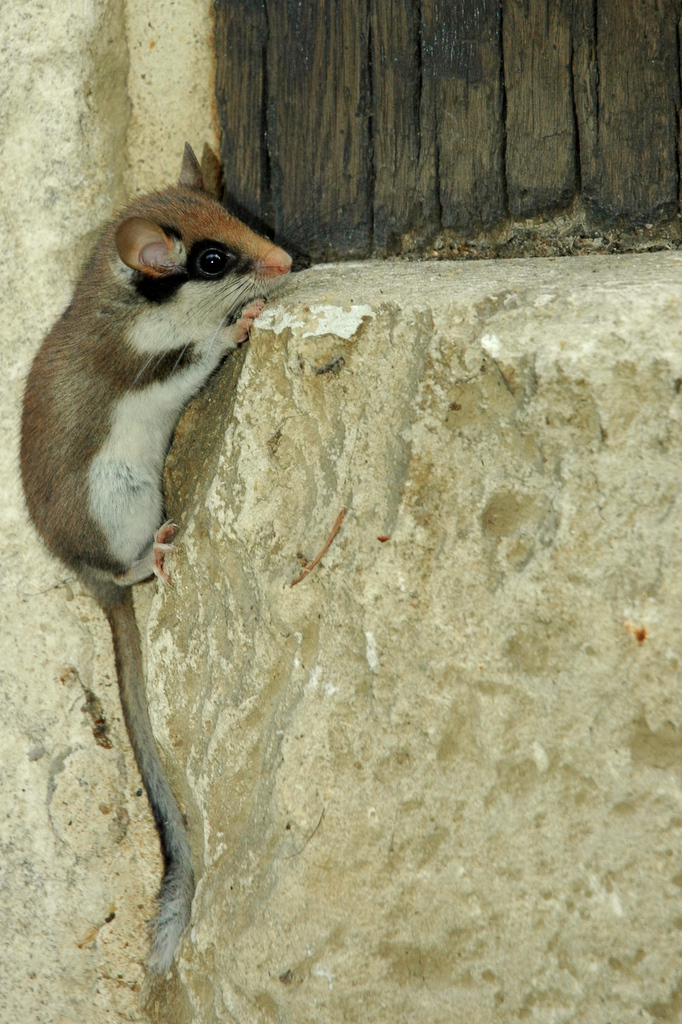

Conservation status
- Vulnerable (IUCN 3.1)

Scientific classification
- Kingdom: Animalia
- Phylum: Chordata
- Class: Mammalia
- Order: Rodentia
- Family: Gliridae
- Genus: Eliomys
- Species: E. quercinus

Binomial name
- Eliomys quercinus (Linnaeus, 1766)
- Geographic range

Synonyms
- Mus quercinus Linnaeus, 1766

= Garden dormouse =

Species of rodent

The garden dormouse (Eliomys quercinus) is a species of dormouse native to Europe.

== Characteristics ==
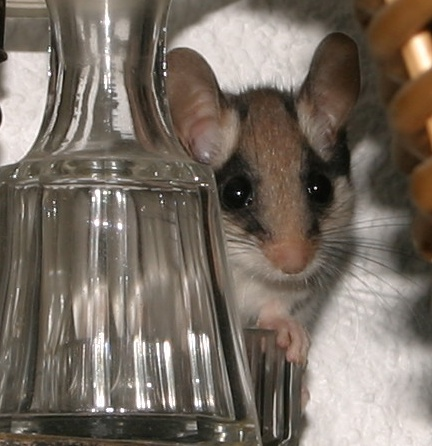
A garden dormouse

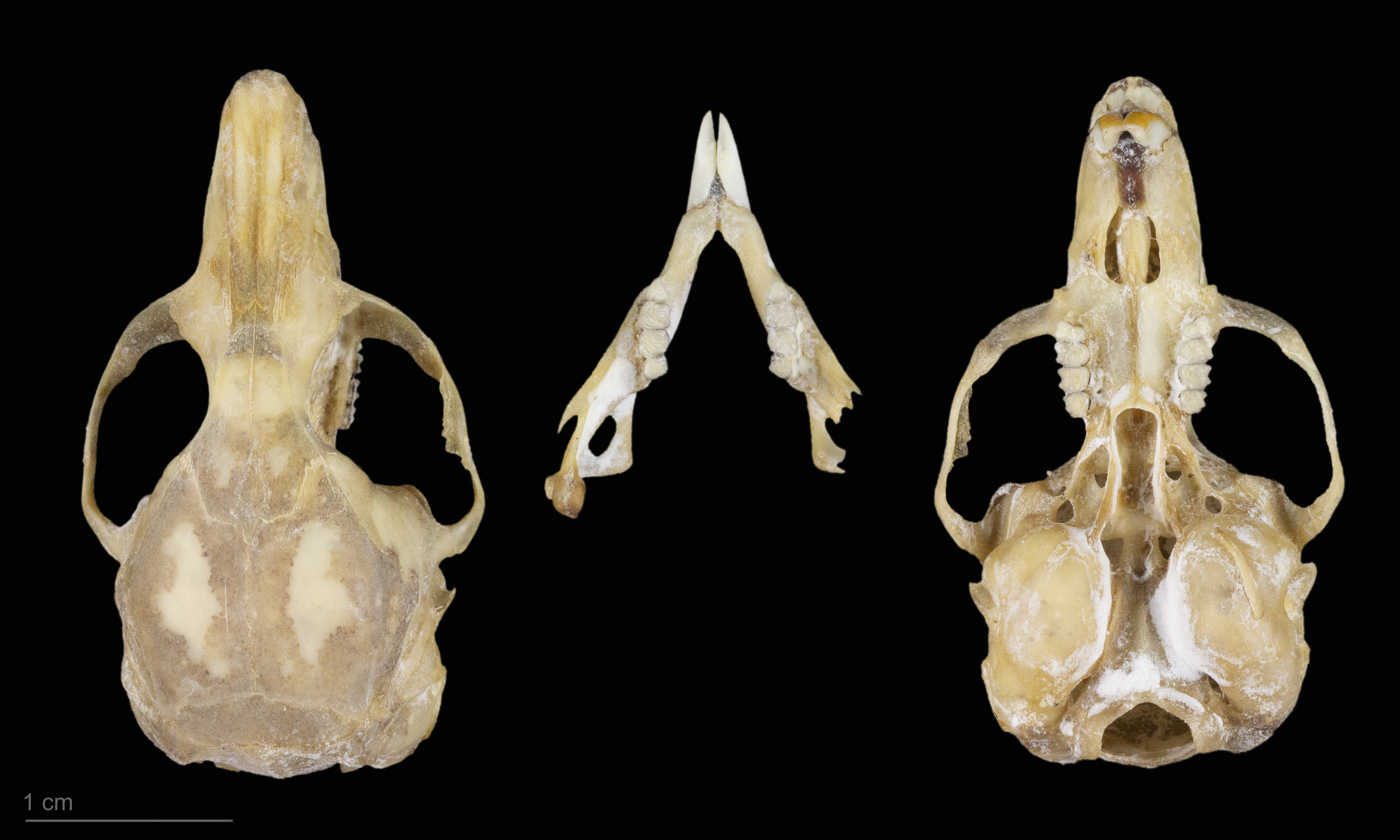
Skull of Eliomys quercinus - MHNT

The garden dormouse is gray or brown, with a whitish underside. It has black eye markings and large ears. Its hair is short, and its tail has a white tassel at the end. It is typically 10 to 15 cm (3.9 to 5.9 in) in head to body length, with a 8 to 14.5 cm (3.1 to 5.7 in) long tail. It weighs 60 to 140 g (2.1 to 4.9 oz).

== Distribution and habitat ==
In spite of its name, the garden dormouse's main habitat is the forest, though it can also be found in fruit-growing regions. It is particularly common in southern Europe, but its range extends into the north. Garden dormice are often found in the Alps, the Bavarian Forest, and the Ore Mountains.

The species is also present in northern Germany, but that population is apparently not capable of large-scale reproduction. In the Netherlands, it is almost extirpated: in 2007, researchers reported finding only nine animals in two woods in the province of Limburg, where it used to be common. They suggested this is a result of the landscape becoming increasingly monotonous and due to climate change, which they said interrupts hibernation.

In 2022, using camera traps and Spurentunnel (a tunnel-like device that forces animals to step into an ink container, and leave footprints), the first recorded sightings of garden dormice in more than 100 years were made in Büsserach.

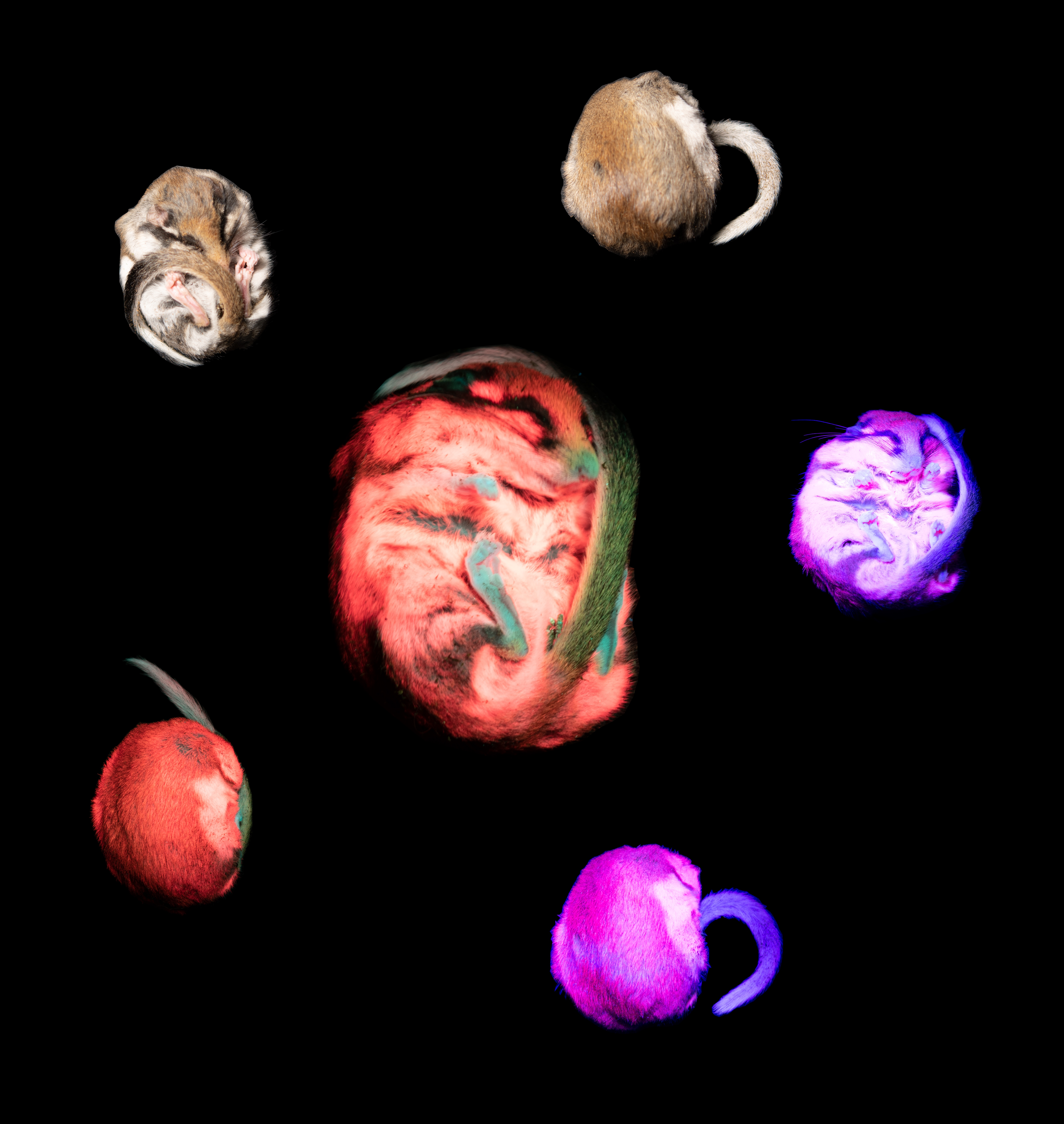
The luminescence of a hibernating garden dormouse photographed from the dorsal and ventral sides. The images were taken under visible light, UV light and UV light with a yellow filter which removes residual light in blue wavelengths. In normal light conditions, the dormouse has brown fur with a white underside but displays bright pink fluorescence under UV light that looks reddish under UV light through a yellow filter. The dormouse's skin, nose and feet show a greenish-blue and its tail only green fluorescence.

== Behaviour and ecology ==
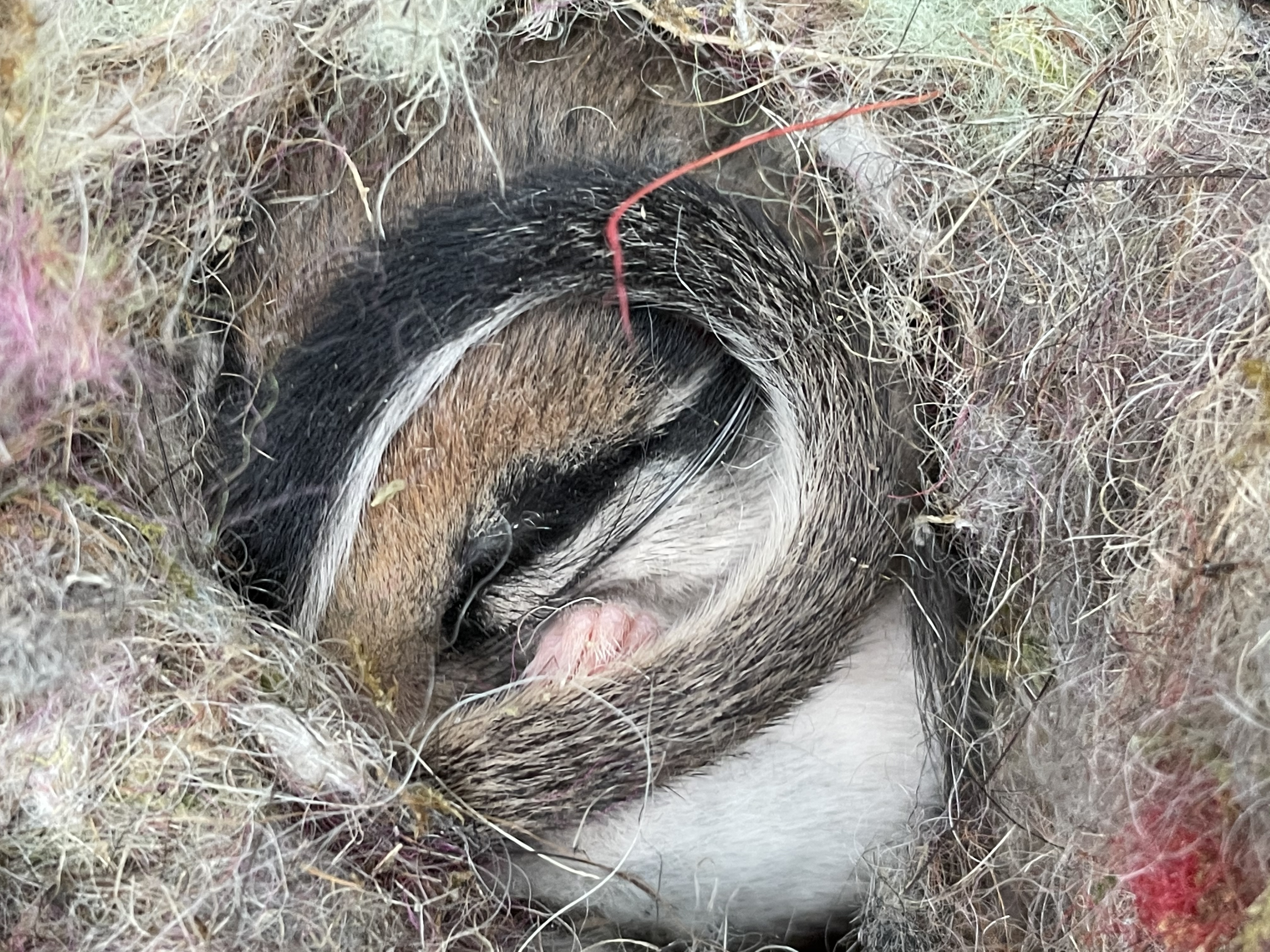
Sleeping garden dormouse in empty bird's nest in Cologne, Germany

The garden dormouse is primarily nocturnal, sleeping in nests in trees during the day, with sometimes multiple individuals living in one nest. Garden dormice are omnivorous, seasonally consuming both small animals—typically arthropods such as insects and millipedes, as well as gastropods like snails and slugs—and plant matter, usually fruit and seeds. Garden dormouse scat collected in Belgium contained foremost leaves and flowers in spring, berries and fruit in summer, and beetles, snails and millipedes throughout the active period. Garden dormice are amongst the most carnivorous of all dormice and have been known to consume adult birds, reptiles, amphibians and small mammals, some of which is likely scavenged. Cannibalism has also been reported.

The mating period lasts from April to June. During this time, the female indicates her readiness to mate by squeaking loudly. The young are usually born in litters of three to seven, after a gestation period of 23 days. Blind and naked at birth, they open their eyes after about 18 days, and are nursed until they are one month old. They become independent at two months of age, but do not reach sexual maturity until the next year. They have a life expectancy of about five years.

The garden dormouse is a host of the Acanthocephalan intestinal parasite Moniliformis siciliensis in Sicily.

== Classification ==
On the islands of the Mediterranean Sea, all of the several subspecies of garden dormouse are very rare. These are the Sardinian garden dormouse (E. q. sardus), the Sicilian garden dormouse (E. q. dichrurus), the Liparian garden dormouse (E. q. liparensis), the Balearic garden dormouse (E. q. gymnesicus) and the Formentera Island garden dormouse (E. q. ophiusae), which is notable for its larger size and all-black tail. The populations of western Asia and north Africa, on the other hand, have recently been separated into their own species, Eliomys melanurus.

== In culture ==
To draw attention to the limits of the adaptability, the Swiss nature conservation organisation Pro Natura has named the garden dormouse "Animal of the Year" in 2022.
