= Eliomys yevesi =

Eliomys yevesi Temporal range: Late Miocene

Scientific classification
- Kingdom: Animalia
- Phylum: Chordata
- Class: Mammalia
- Infraclass: Placentalia
- Order: Rodentia
- Family: Gliridae
- Genus: Eliomys
- Species: †E. yevesi

Binomial name
- †Eliomys yevesi Mansino et al., 2015

Eliomys yevesi is an extinct rodent species of the genus Eliomys that lived during the Late Miocene.

== Distribution ==
Eliomys yevesi is known from Spain.
