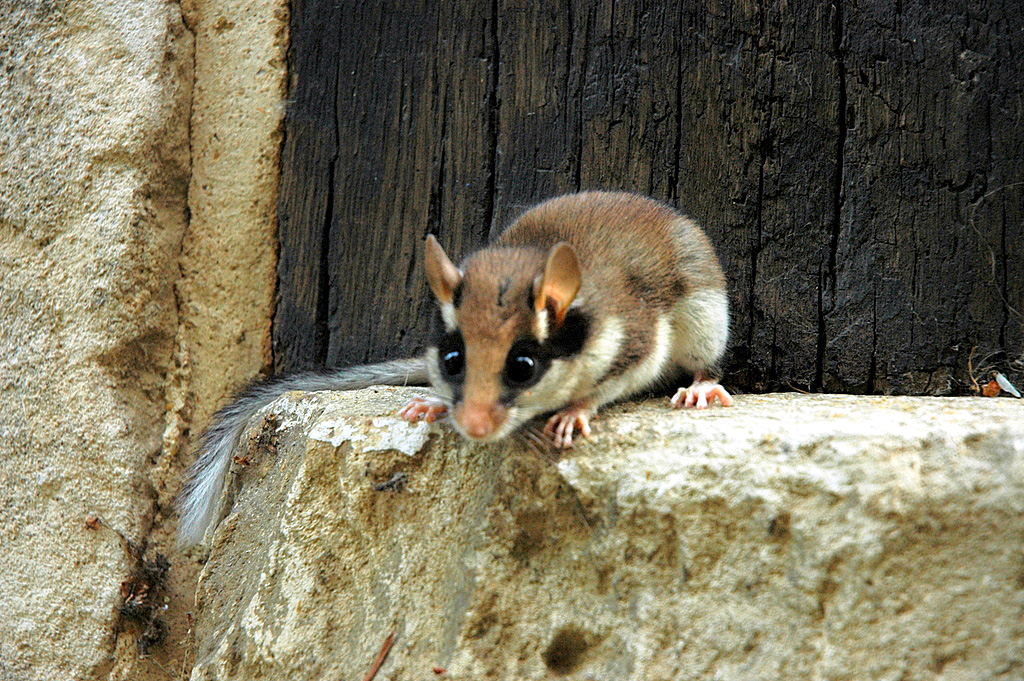
- Garden dormouse (Eliomys quercinus)

Scientific classification
- Kingdom: Animalia
- Phylum: Chordata
- Class: Mammalia
- Order: Rodentia
- Family: Gliridae
- Subfamily: Leithiinae
- Genus: Eliomys; Wagner, 1840

Type species
- Eliomys melanurus Wagner, 1840

Species
- Eliomys melanurus Eliomys munbyanus Eliomys quercinus
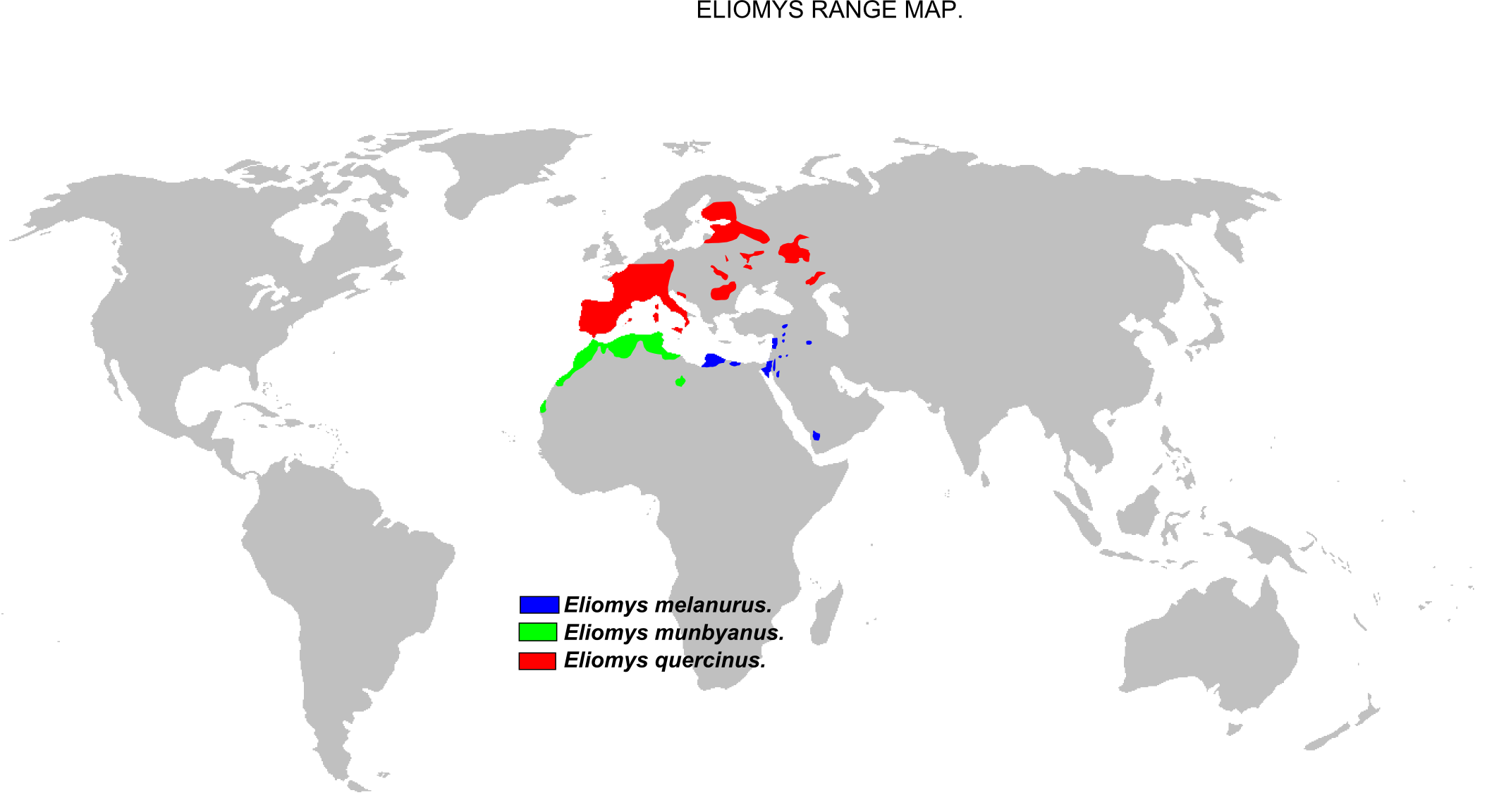
- Distribution of Eliomys

= Eliomys =

Eliomys Temporal range: Tortonian–Recent

Genus of rodents

Eliomys (Ancient Greek: Ἡλίομυς Hēlíomus) is a genus of Palaearctic rodents in the family Gliridae, commonly known as garden dormice, a name most commonly applied to the European species Eliomys quercinus.

== Species ==
Eliomys contains the following extant species:

- Asian garden dormouse, Eliomys melanurus
- Maghreb garden dormouse, Eliomys munbyanus
- Garden dormouse, Eliomys quercinus

The earliest records of the genus are known from the Late Miocene (Tortonian) of the Iberian Peninsula.

Fossil species assigned to Eliomys include:

- †Eliomys truci
- †Eliomys yevesi
- †Eliomys intermedius
- †Eliomys assimilis
- †Eliomys lafarguei
- †Eliomys reductus
