= Maghreb garden dormouse =

Conservation status
- Least Concern (IUCN 3.1)

Scientific classification
- Kingdom: Animalia
- Phylum: Chordata
- Class: Mammalia
- Order: Rodentia
- Family: Gliridae
- Genus: Eliomys
- Species: E. munbyanus

Binomial name
- Eliomys munbyanus (Pomel, 1856)
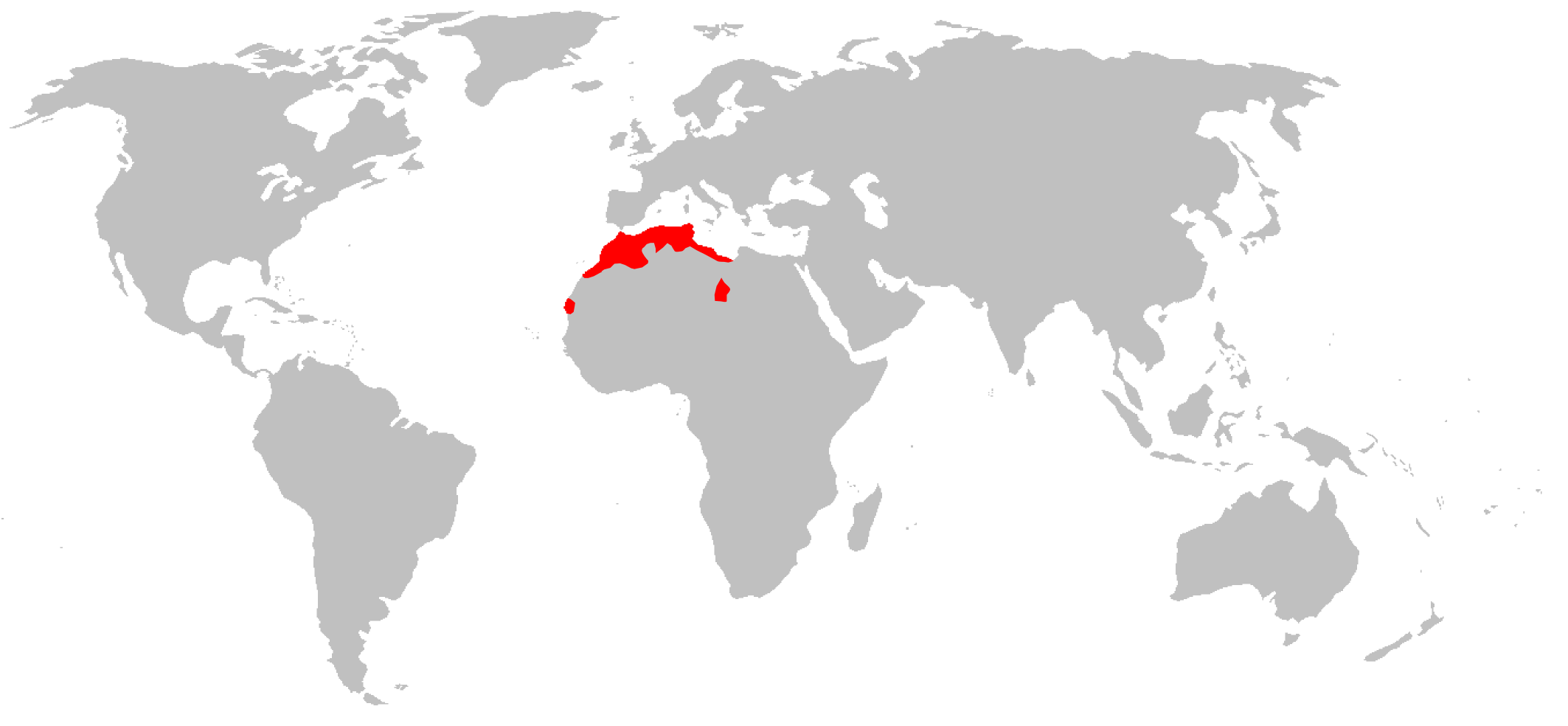
- Distribution of Eliomys munbyanus

Synonyms
- Eliomys denticulatus (Ranck, 1968), Eliomys lerotina (Lataste, 1885), Eliomys occidentalis (Thomas, 1903), Eliomys tunetae (Thomas, 1903)

Species of rodent

The Maghreb garden dormouse (Eliomys munbyanus) is a nocturnal species of rodent in the family Gliridae. It is found in Algeria, Libya, Morocco, Tunisia and Western Sahara. Its natural habitats vary from humid forests to semi-deserts. It is a common species and the International Union for Conservation of Nature has rated it as being of "least concern".

== Description ==
The Maghreb garden dormouse is a medium-sized species with moderately long, soft, sometimes woolly, fur. The upper parts are a yellowish or reddish-brown tinged with grey. The underparts are white tinged with grey; there is a clear demarcation line between the two colours. The top of the head matches the upper parts, but the colour becomes paler towards the snout. The large eyes are surrounded by a dark mask. The cheeks are whitish or cream and a streak of the same colour extends to the shoulders. The ears are medium-sized, oval and brown, and there is usually a reddish or pale patch of bare skin behind the ears. The tail is long, has short hair, and is rather variable in colour. The upper side is usually black and the underside pale grey or brownish-white. The base of the tail is similar to the body colour and the tip has longer hairs than the rest of the tail and is white.

== Distribution and habitat ==
The Maghreb garden dormouse is native to Western Sahara, Morocco, Algeria, Tunisia and Libya. It is found from sea level to altitudes of 3,800 m (12,467 ft) in the High Atlas Mountains. It occurs in a range of habitats including humid forest, pine forests, mountain cedar forests, coastal dunes and semi-desert, and sometimes enters habitations. It seems to prefer rocky habitats.
