= List of sminthids =

Species in mammal family Sminthidae

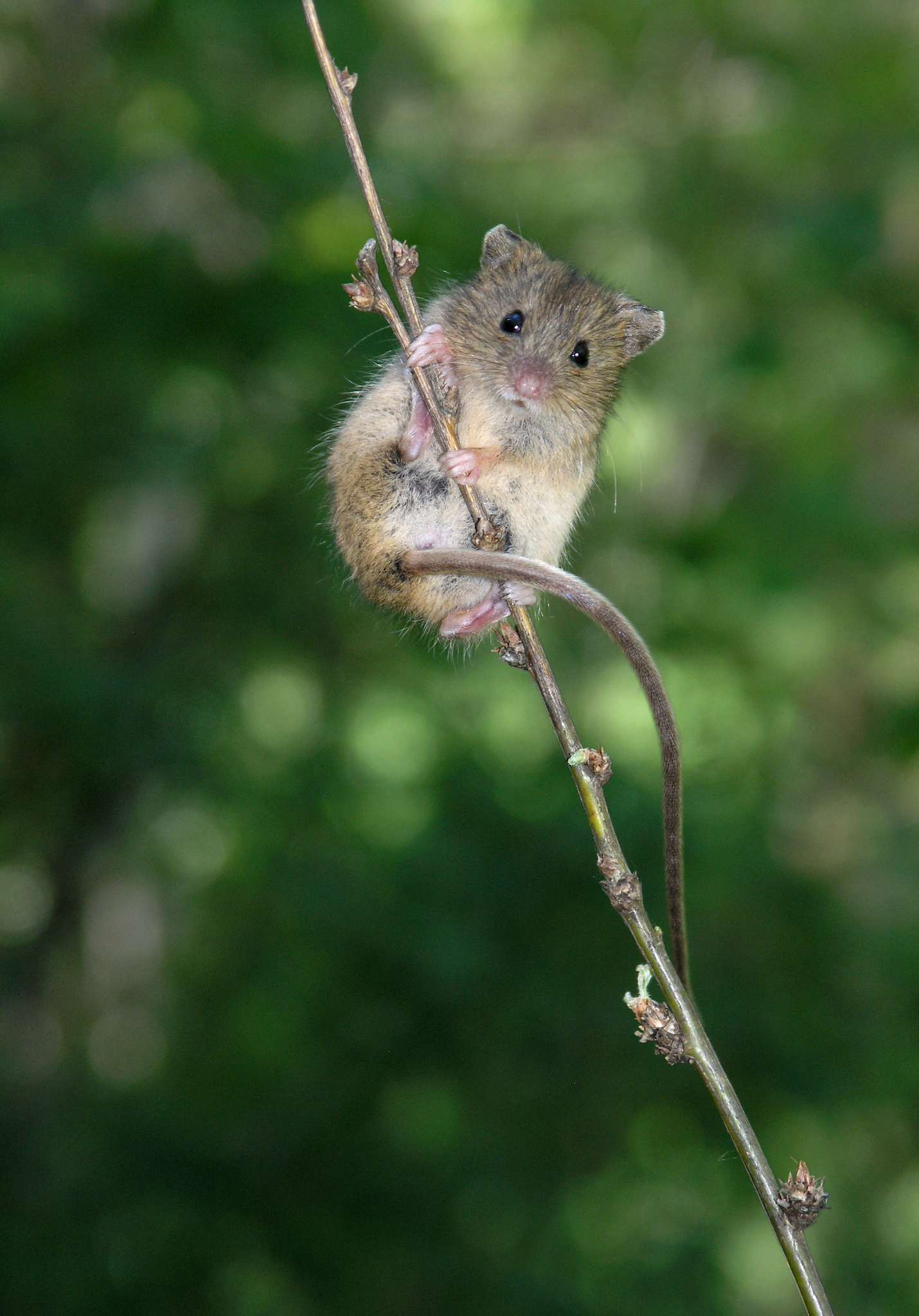
Northern birch mouse (Sicista betulina)

Sminthidae is a family of mammals in the order Rodentia and part of the Myomorpha suborder. Members of this family are called sminthids or birch mice. They are found in Asia and Europe, primarily in forests, shrublands, and grasslands, though some species can be found in wetlands. They are all of a similar size, ranging from 4–8 cm (2–3 in) long, plus a 6–12 cm (2–5 in) tail. Sminthids are omnivores and primarily eat seeds, berries, and insects. No sminthids have population estimates, but the Hungarian birch mouse is categorized as endangered, while the Armenian birch mouse, Nordmann's birch mouse, and Severtzov's birch mouse are categorized as critically endangered.

The sixteen extant species of Sminthidae are all in a single genus. Several extinct prehistoric sminthid species have been discovered, though due to ongoing research and discoveries, the exact number and categorization is not fixed.

== Conventions ==
IUCN Red List categories
Conservation status
- EX: Extinct (0 species)
- EW: Extinct in the wild (0 species)
- CR: Critically endangered (3 species)
- EN: Endangered (1 species)
- VU: Vulnerable (1 species)
- NT: Near threatened (2 species)
- LC: Least concern (9 species)

The author citation for the species or genus is given after the scientific name; parentheses around the author citation indicate that this was not the original taxonomic placement. Conservation status codes listed follow the International Union for Conservation of Nature (IUCN) Red List of Threatened Species. Range maps are provided wherever possible; if a range map is not available, a description of the sminthid's range is provided. Ranges are based on the IUCN Red List for that species unless otherwise noted.

== Classification ==
Sminthidae is a family consisting of sixteen extant species in a single genus, Sicista. This does not include hybrid species or extinct prehistoric species.

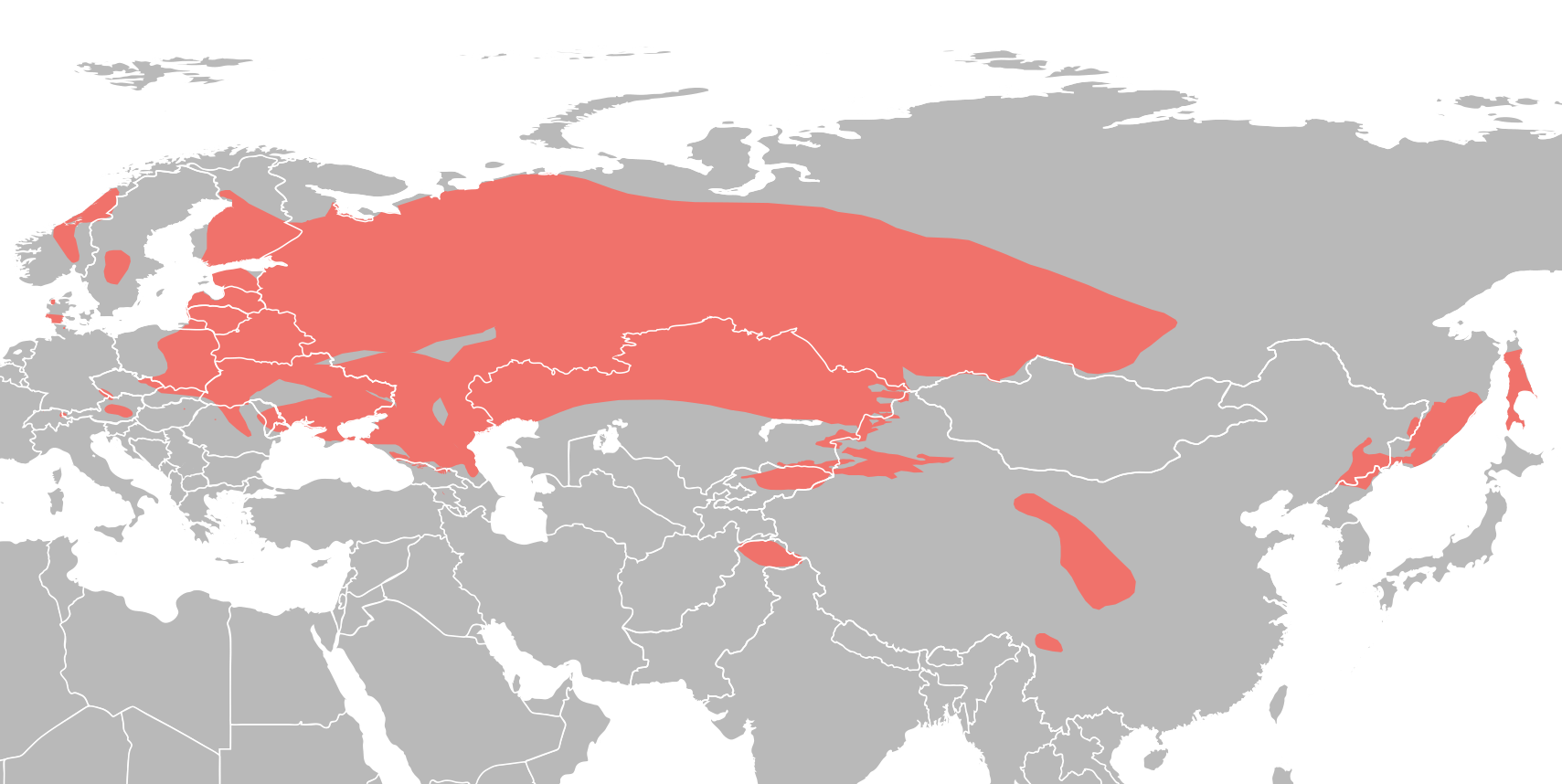
Sminthidae distribution

== Sminthids ==
The following classification is based on the taxonomy described by the reference work Mammal Species of the World (2005), with augmentation by generally accepted proposals made since using molecular phylogenetic analysis, as supported by both the IUCN and the American Society of Mammalogists.

Genus Sicista – Gray, 1827 – sixteen species
Common name	Scientific name and subspecies	Range	Size and ecology	IUCN status and estimated population
Altai birch mouse	S. napaea Hollister, 1912	Eastern Kazakhstan and southern Russia	Size: 6–8 cm (2–3 in) long, plus 8–11 cm (3–4 in) tail Habitat: Shrubland and grassland	LC Unknown
Armenian birch mouse	S. armenica Baskevich, 1988	Armenia	Size: About 7 cm (3 in) long, plus 9–11 cm (4 in) tail Habitat: Grassland	CR Unknown
Caucasian birch mouse	S. caucasica Vinogradov, 1925	Southwestern Russia and northern Georgia	Size: 4–7 cm (2–3 in) long, plus 8–11 cm (3–4 in) tail Habitat: Grassland	NT Unknown
Chinese birch mouse	S. concolor (Büchner, 1892)	Central and western China	Size: 5–8 cm (2–3 in) long, plus 8–11 cm (3–4 in) tail Habitat: Forest, shrubland, and grassland	LC Unknown
Gray birch mouse	S. pseudonapaea Strautman, 1949	Eastern Kazakhstan and northwestern China	Size: 6–8 cm (2–3 in) long, plus 8–11 cm (3–4 in) tail Habitat: Forest, shrubland, and grassland	LC Unknown
Hungarian birch mouse	S. trizona (Frivaldszky, 1865)	Hungary and Romania	Size: 5–7 cm (2–3 in) long, plus 6–10 cm (2–4 in) tail Habitat: Grassland	EN Unknown
Kazbeg birch mouse	S. kazbegica Sokolov, Baskevich, & Kovalskaya, 1986	Georgia and southwestern Russia	Size: 6–7 cm (2–3 in) long, plus 9–11 cm (4 in) tail Habitat: Forest and grassland	VU Unknown
Kluchor birch mouse	S. kluchorica Sokolov, Kovalskaya, & Baskevich, 1980	Georgia and southwestern Russia	Size: 6–8 cm (2–3 in) long, plus 8–11 cm (3–4 in) tail Habitat: Grassland	LC Unknown
Long-tailed birch mouse	S. caudata Thomas, 1907	Eastern Russia and eastern China	Size: 6–8 cm (2–3 in) long, plus 9–12 cm (4–5 in) tail Habitat: Forest and grassland	LC Unknown
Nordmann's birch mouse	S. loriger (Nathusius, 1840)	Eastern Europe and southwestern Russia	Size: 5–8 cm (2–3 in) long, plus 6–9 cm (2–4 in) tail Habitat: Grassland	CR Unknown
Northern birch mouse	S. betulina (Pallas, 1779)	Central, eastern, and northern Europe and western Asia	Size: 5–8 cm (2–3 in) long, plus 8–10 cm (3–4 in) tail Habitat: Forest, grassland, and inland wetlands	LC Unknown
Severtzov's birch mouse	S. severtzovi Ogniov, 1935	Southwestern Russia	Size: 6–8 cm (2–3 in) long, plus 7–9 cm (3–4 in) tail Habitat: Grassland	CR Unknown
Southern birch mouse	S. subtilis (Pallas, 1773)	Central Asia	Size: 5–8 cm (2–3 in) long, plus 7–9 cm (3–4 in) tail Habitat: Shrubland and grassland	LC Unknown
Strand's birch mouse	S. strandi (Formozov, 1931)	Ukraine and southwestern Russia	Size: 6–8 cm (2–3 in) long, plus 8–11 cm (3–4 in) tail Habitat: Forest and grassland	LC Unknown
Tien Shan birch mouse	S. tianshanica (Zalensky, 1903)	Central Asia	Size: 5–8 cm (2–3 in) long, plus 10–12 cm (4–5 in) tail Habitat: Forest and grassland	LC Unknown
Tsimlyansk birch mouse	S. cimlanica Kovalskaya, Tikhonov, Tikhonova, Surov, & Bogomolov, 2000	Ukraine and southwestern Russia	Size: Unknown Habitat: Grassland	NT Unknown

== Sources ==
- Chernasky, Amy; Motis, Anna; Burgin, Connor, eds. (2023). All the Mammals of the World. Lynx Nature Books. ISBN 978-84-16728-66-4.
- Nowak, Ronald M. (1999). Walker's Mammals of the World. Vol. 2 (6th ed.). Johns Hopkins University Press. ISBN 978-0-8018-5789-8.
- Holder, Mary Ellen; Musser, Guy G. (2005). Wilson, Don E.; Reeder, DeeAnn M. (eds.). Mammal Species of the World. Vol. 2 (3rd ed.). Johns Hopkins University Press. ISBN 978-0-8018-8221-0.
