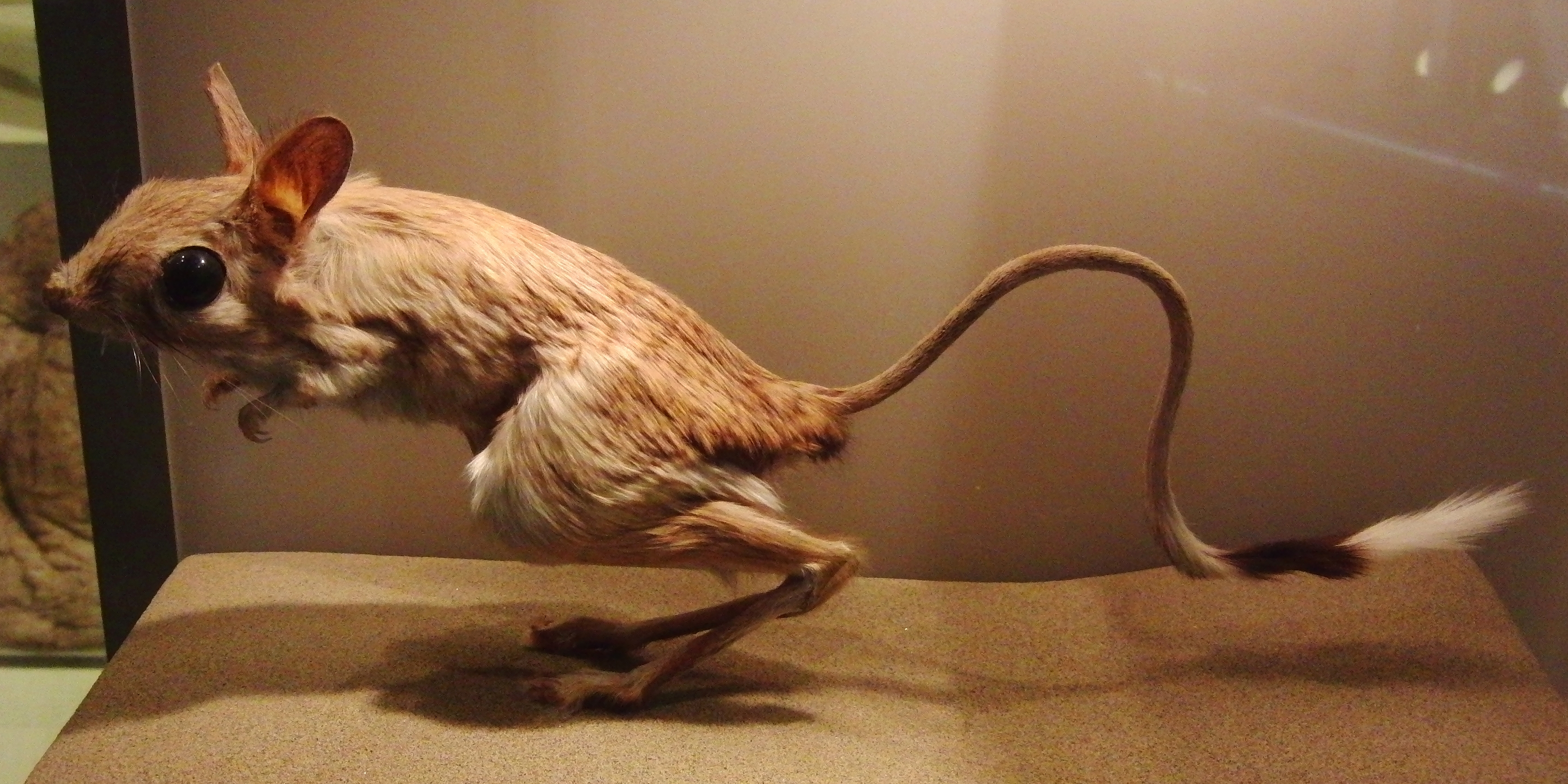
- Jaculus orientalis
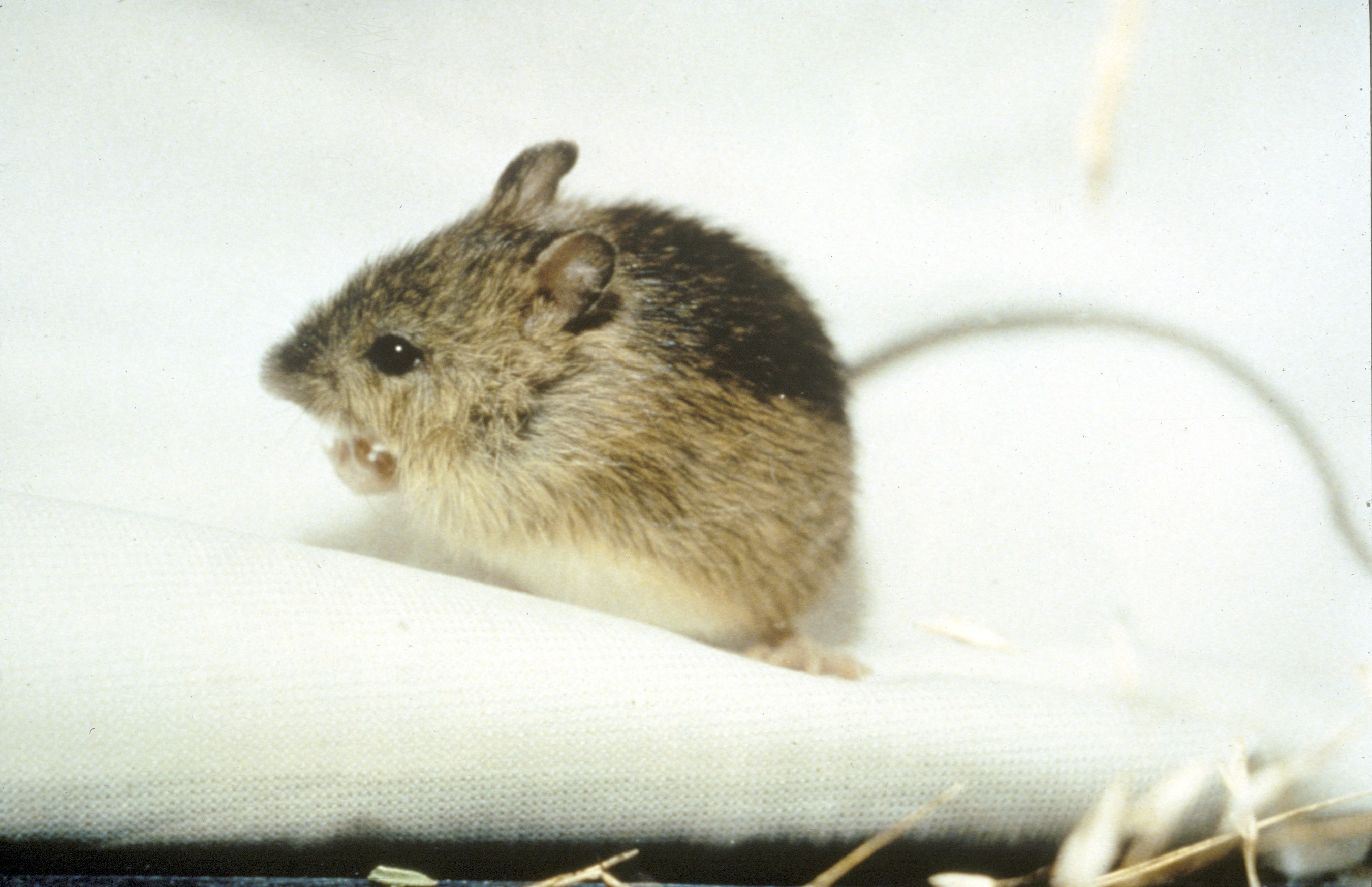
- Zapus hudsonius

Scientific classification
- Kingdom: Animalia
- Phylum: Chordata
- Class: Mammalia
- Order: Rodentia
- Suborder: Myomorpha
- Superfamily: Dipodoidea; Fischer de Waldheim, 1817

Families
- Dipodidae; Sminthidae; Zapodidae

= Dipodoidea =

Dipodoidea Temporal range: Late Eocene–Recent

Family of rodents

Dipodoidea is a superfamily of rodents, also known as dipodoids, found across the Northern Hemisphere. This superfamily includes over 50 species among the 16 genera in 3 families. They include the jerboas (family Dipodidae), jumping mice (family Zapodidae), and birch mice (family Sminthidae). Different species are found in grassland, deserts, and forests. They are all capable of saltation (jumping while in a bipedal stance), a feature that is most highly evolved in the desert-dwelling jerboas.

== Taxonomy ==
Formerly, Dipodoidea contained only a single large family, Dipodidae, which contained jerboas, jumping mice, and birch mice as subfamilies. However, phylogenetic evidence found all three to be distinct families from one another, and thus they were split into three different families within Dipodoidea.

== Characteristics ==
Dipodoids are small to medium-sized rodents, ranging from 4 to 26 cm (1.6 to 10.2 in) in body length, excluding the tail. They are all adapted for jumping, although to varying degrees. The jerboas have very long hind legs which, in most species, include cannon bones. They move either by jumping, or by walking on their hind legs. The jumping mice have long feet, but lack the extreme adaptations of the jerboas, so that they move by crawling or making short hops, rather than long leaps. Both jerboas and jumping mice have long tails to aid their balance. Birch mice have shorter tails and feet, but they, too, move by jumping.

Most dipodoids are omnivorous, with a diet consisting of seeds and insects. Some species of jerboa, however, such as Allactaga sibirica, are almost entirely insectivorous. Like other rodents, they have gnawing incisors separated from the grinding cheek teeth by a gap, or diastema. The dental formula for dipodids is:

Dentition
1.0.0-1.3
1.0.0-1.3

Jerboas and birch mice make their nests in burrows, which, in the case of jerboas, may be complex, with side-chambers for storage of food. In contrast, while jumping mice sometimes co-opt the burrows of other species, they do not dig their own, and generally nest in thick vegetation. Most species hibernate for at least half the year, surviving on fat that they build up in the weeks prior to going to sleep.

Dipodoids give birth to litters of between two and seven young after a gestation period of between 17 and 42 days. They breed once or twice a year, depending on the species.

== Classification ==
=== Extant species ===
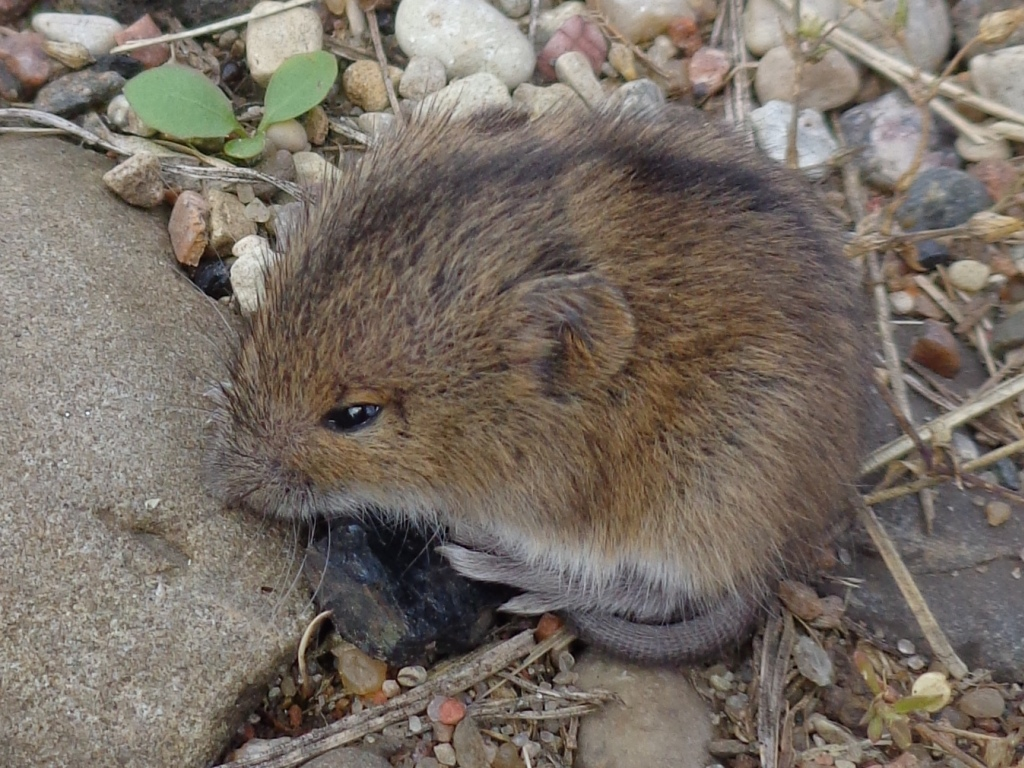
Northern birch mouse (Sicista betulina), Sicistinae

Superfamily Dipodoidea

- Family Sminthidae
  - Genus Sicista, birch mice
    - Armenian birch mouse Sicista armenica
    - Northern birch mouse, Sicista betulina
    - Caucasian birch mouse, Sicista caucasica
    - Long-tailed birch mouse, Sicista caudata
    - Tsimlyansk birch mouse, Sicista cimlanica
    - Chinese birch mouse, Sicista concolor
    - Kazbeg birch mouse, Sicista kazbegica
    - Kluchor birch mouse, Sicista kluchorica
    - Nordmann's birch mouse, Sicistica loriger
    - Altai birch mouse, Sicista napaea
    - Gray birch mouse, Sicista pseudonapaea
    - Severtzov's birch mouse, Sicista severtzovi
    - Strand's birch mouse, Sicista strandi
    - Southern birch mouse, Sicista subtilis
    - Talgar birch mouse, Sicista talgarica
    - Terskey birch mouse, Sicista terskeica
    - Tien Shan birch mouse, Sicista tianshanica
    - Hungarian birch mouse, Sicista trizona
    - Zhetysu birch mouse, Sicista zhetysuica
- Family Zapodidae, jumping mice
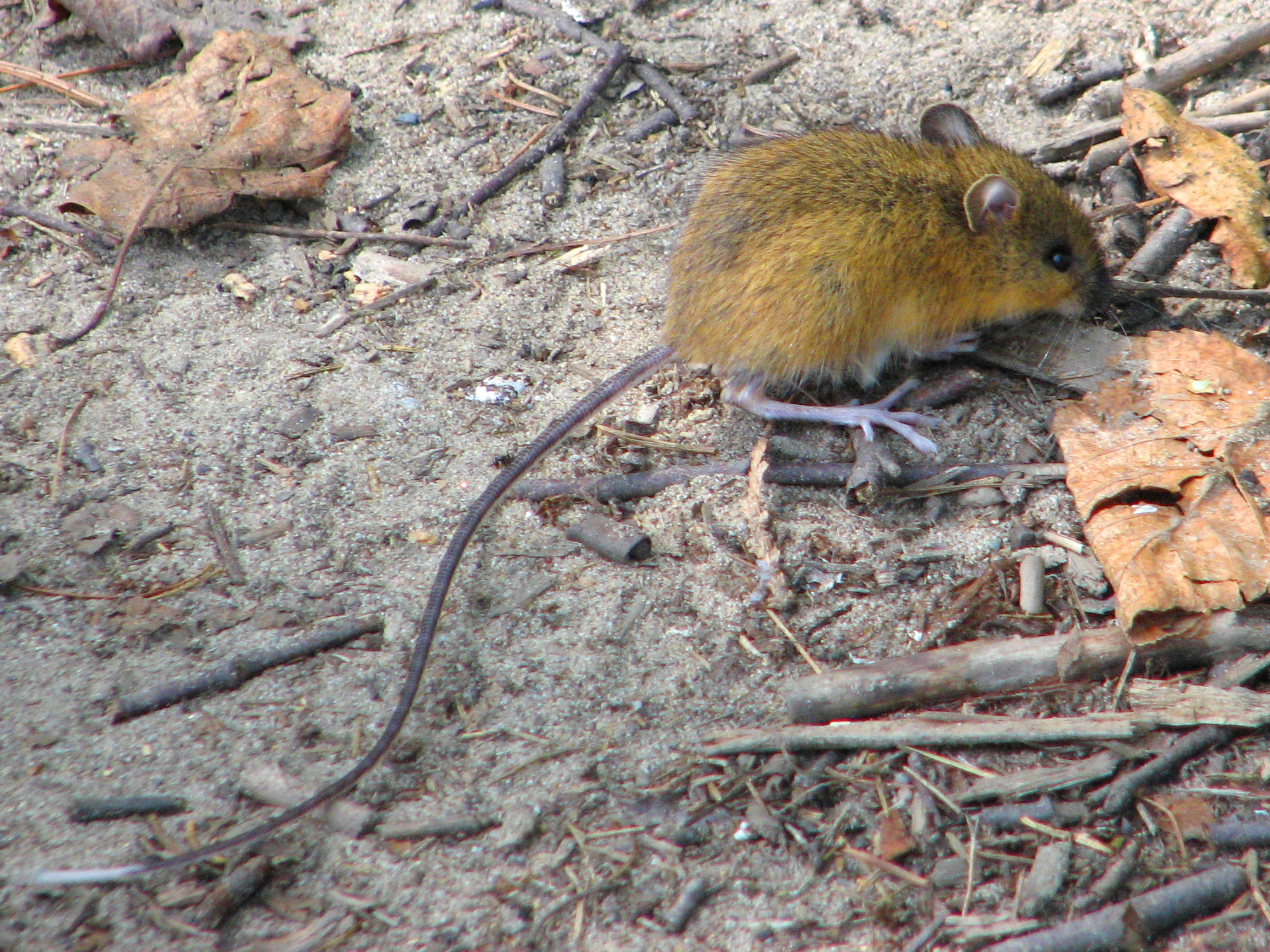
  Woodland jumping mouse (Napaeozapus insignis), Zapodinae
  - Genus Eozapus
    - Chinese jumping mouse, Eozapus setchuanus
  - Genus Napaeozapus
    - Western woodland jumping mouse, Napaeozapus abietorum
    - Eastern woodland jumping mouse, Napaeozapus insignis
  - Genus Zapus
    - Northern meadow jumping mouse, Zapus hudsonius
    - Southern meadow jumping mouse, Zapus luteus
    - Central Pacific jumping mouse, Zapus montanus
    - Oregon jumping mouse, Zapus oregonus
    - South Pacific jumping mouse, Zapus pacificus
    - Southwestern jumping mouse, Zapus princeps
    - Northwestern jumping mouse, Zapus saltator
    - North Pacific jumping mouse, Zapus trinotatus
- Family Dipodidae, jerboas
  - Subfamily Allactaginae
    - Genus Allactaga
      - Subgenus Allactaga
        - Small five-toed jerboa, Allactaga elater
        - Iranian jerboa, Allactaga firouzi
        - Hotson's jerboa, Allactaga hotsoni
        - Great jerboa, Allactaga major
        - Severtzov's jerboa, Allactaga severtzovi
        - Vinogradov's jerboa, Allactaga vinogradovi
      - Subgenus Orientallactaga
        - Balikun jerboa, Allactaga balikunica
        - Gobi jerboa, Allactaga bullata
        - Mongolian five-toed jerboa, Allactaga sibirica
      - Subgenus Paralactaga
        - Euphrates jerboa, Allactaga euphraticus
        - Williams' jerboa, Allactaga williamsi
      - incertae sedis
        - Allactaga toussi
    - Genus Scarturus
        - Four-toed jerboa, Allactaga tetradactylus
    - Genus Allactodipus
      - Bobrinski's jerboa, Allactodipus bobrinskii
    - Genus Pygeretmus, fat-tailed jerboas
      - Lesser fat-tailed jerboa, Pygeretmus platyurus
      - Dwarf fat-tailed jerboa, Pygeretmus pumilio
      - Greater fat-tailed jerboa, Pygeretmus shitkovi
  - Subfamily Cardiocraniinae
    - Genus Cardiocranius
      - Five-toed pygmy jerboa, Cardiocranius paradoxus
    - Genus Salpingotulus
      - Baluchistan pygmy jerboa, Salpingotulus michaelis
    - Genus Salpingotus, pygmy jerboas
      - Subgenus Anguistodontus
        - Thick-tailed pygmy jerboa, Salpingotus crassicauda
      - Subgenus Prosalpingotus
        - Heptner's pygmy jerboa, Salpingotus heptneri
        - Pale pygmy jerboa, Salpingotus pallidus
        - Thomas's pygmy jerboa, Salpingotus thomasi
      - Subgenus Salpingotus
        - Kozlov's pygmy jerboa, Salpingotus kozlovi
  - Subfamily Dipodinae
    - Tribe Dipodini
      - Genus Dipus
        - Northern three-toed jerboa, Dipus sagitta
      - Genus Eremodipus
        - Lichtenstein's jerboa, Eremodipus lichtensteini
      - Genus Jaculus
        - Blanford's jerboa, Jaculus blanfordi
        - Lesser Egyptian jerboa, Jaculus jaculus
        - Greater Egyptian jerboa, Jaculus orientalis
        - Thaler's jerboa, Jaculus thaleri
      - Genus Stylodipus, three-toed jerboas
        - Andrews's three-toed jerboa, Stylodipus andrewsi
        - Mongolian three-toed jerboa, Stylodipus sungorus
        - Thick-tailed three-toed jerboa, Stylodipus telum
    - Tribe Paradipodini
      - Genus Paradipus
        - Comb-toed jerboa, Paradipus ctenodactylus
  - Subfamily Euchoreutinae
    - Genus Euchoreutes, long-eared jerboa
      - Long-eared jerboa, Euchoreutes naso

=== Fossil genera ===
Dipodoidea has a well-documented fossil record dating back to the Eocene. These fossil species are definitively known:

- Genus †Aksyiromys
- Genus †Elymys
- Genus †Primisminthus
- Family †Simimyidae
  - Genus †Simimys
- Genus †Simiacritomys

Primisminthus from the middle Eocene of China could be the oldest member of the group, while Banyuesminthus, also from the middle Eocene of China, could represent a sister group to the rest of the Dipodoidea.
