= List of mammals of Sweden =

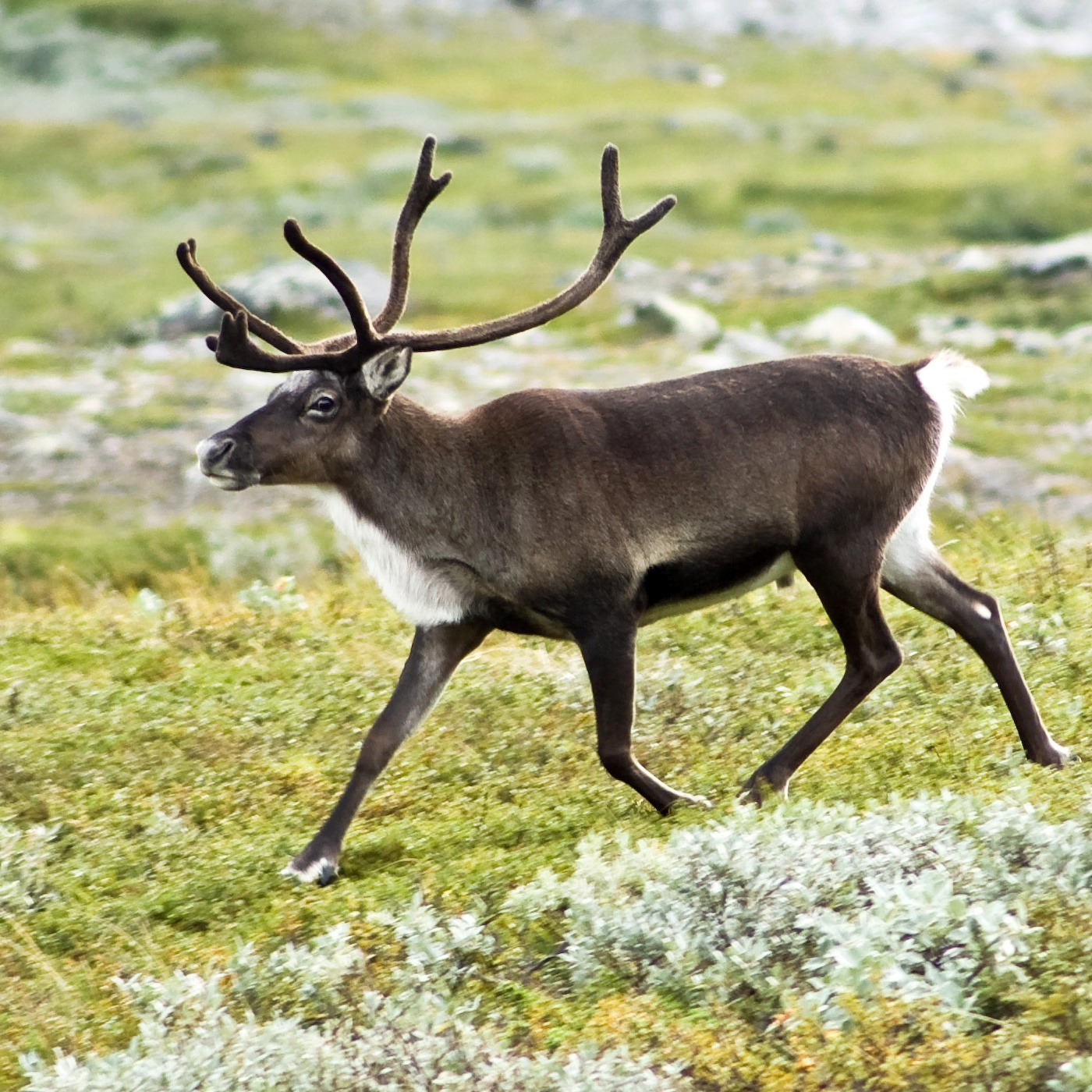
Reindeer

There are 84 mammal species (with two uncertain) recorded in Sweden according to the IUCN Red List. Two are endangered, one is vulnerable as well now extinct, and four are near threatened. The Swedish name is in parentheses following the English name, scientific name and conservation status.

Icons which state each species' global IUCN status:
EN	Endangered	Facing an extremely high risk of extinction in the wild
VU	Vulnerable	Facing a high risk of extinction in the wild
NT	Near threatened	Doesn't meet any of the criteria that would categorise it as risking extinction but likely to in the future
LC	Least concern	No current identifiable risks to this species
DD	Data deficient	There is inadequate information to make an assessment of the risks to this species

== Even-toed ungulates ==
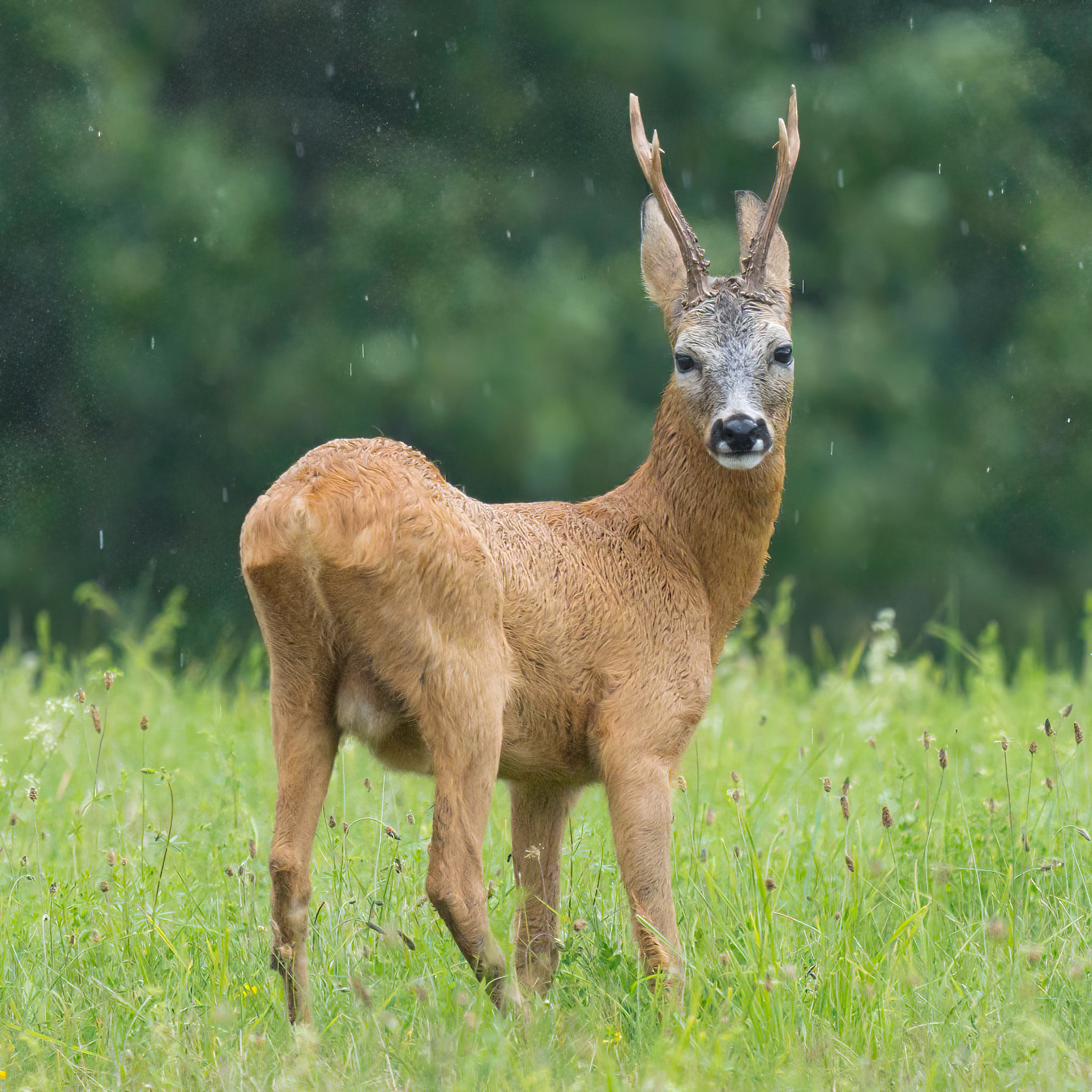
Roe deer

Even-toed ungulates are members of the order Artiodactyla. The even-toed ungulates are ungulates whose weight is borne about equally by the third and fourth toes, rather than mostly or entirely by the third as in perissodactyls. There are about 220 artiodactyl species, including many that are of great economic importance to humans.

=== Family: Bovidae ===
- European bison, Bison bonasus NT extirpated (visent)
- European mouflon, Ovis aries musimon introduced (mufflonfår)
- Muskox, Ovibos moschatus LC reintroduced (myskoxe)

=== Family: Cervidae ===
- Eurasian elk, Alces alces LC (älg)
- Roe deer, Capreolus capreolus LC (rådjur)
- Red deer, Cervus elaphus LC (kronhjort)
- European fallow deer, Dama dama LC introduced (dovhjort)
- Reindeer, Rangifer tarandus VU (ren)

=== Family: Suidae ===
- Wild boar, Sus scrofa LC (vildsvin)

== Carnivorans ==
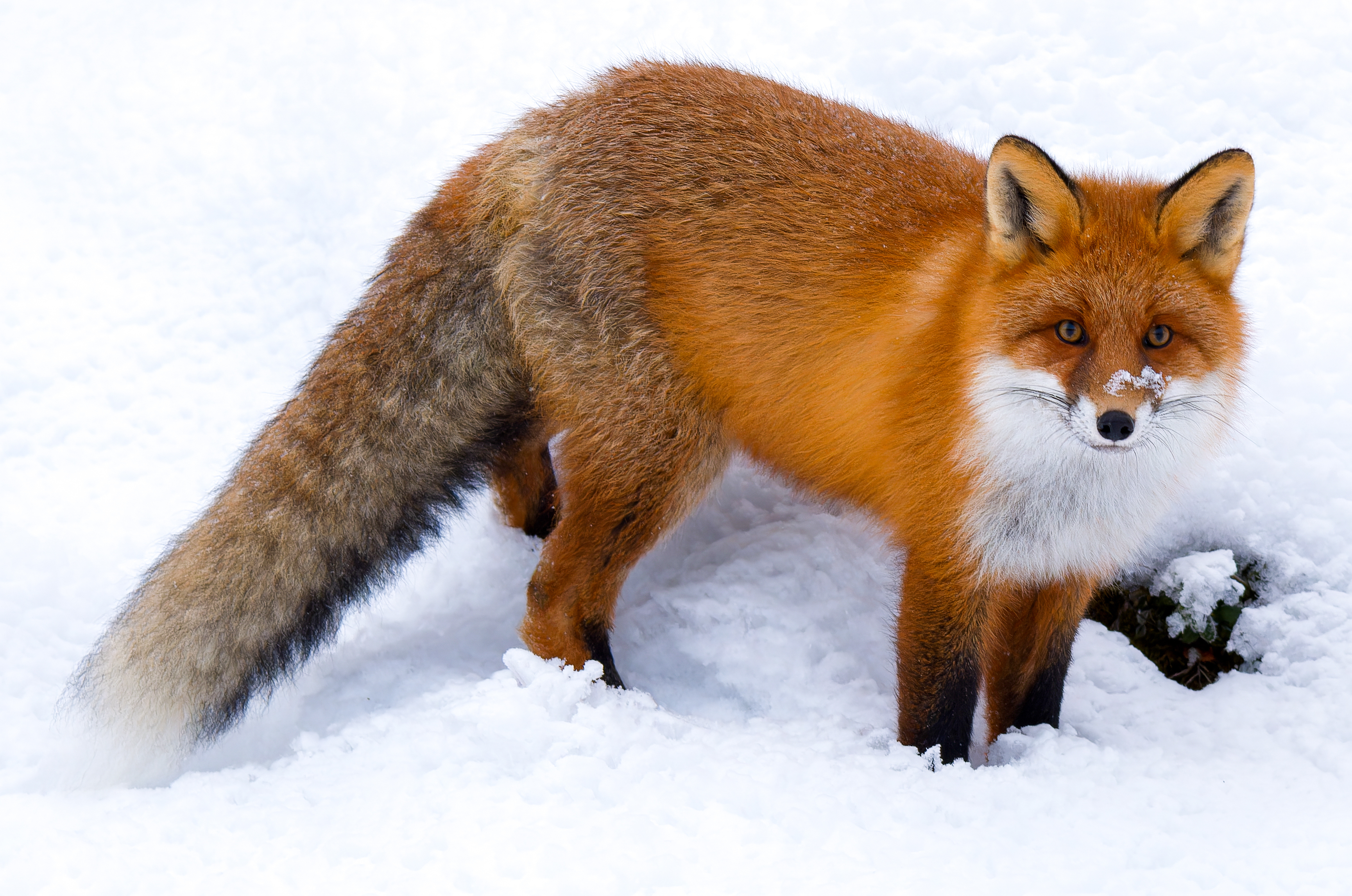
Red fox

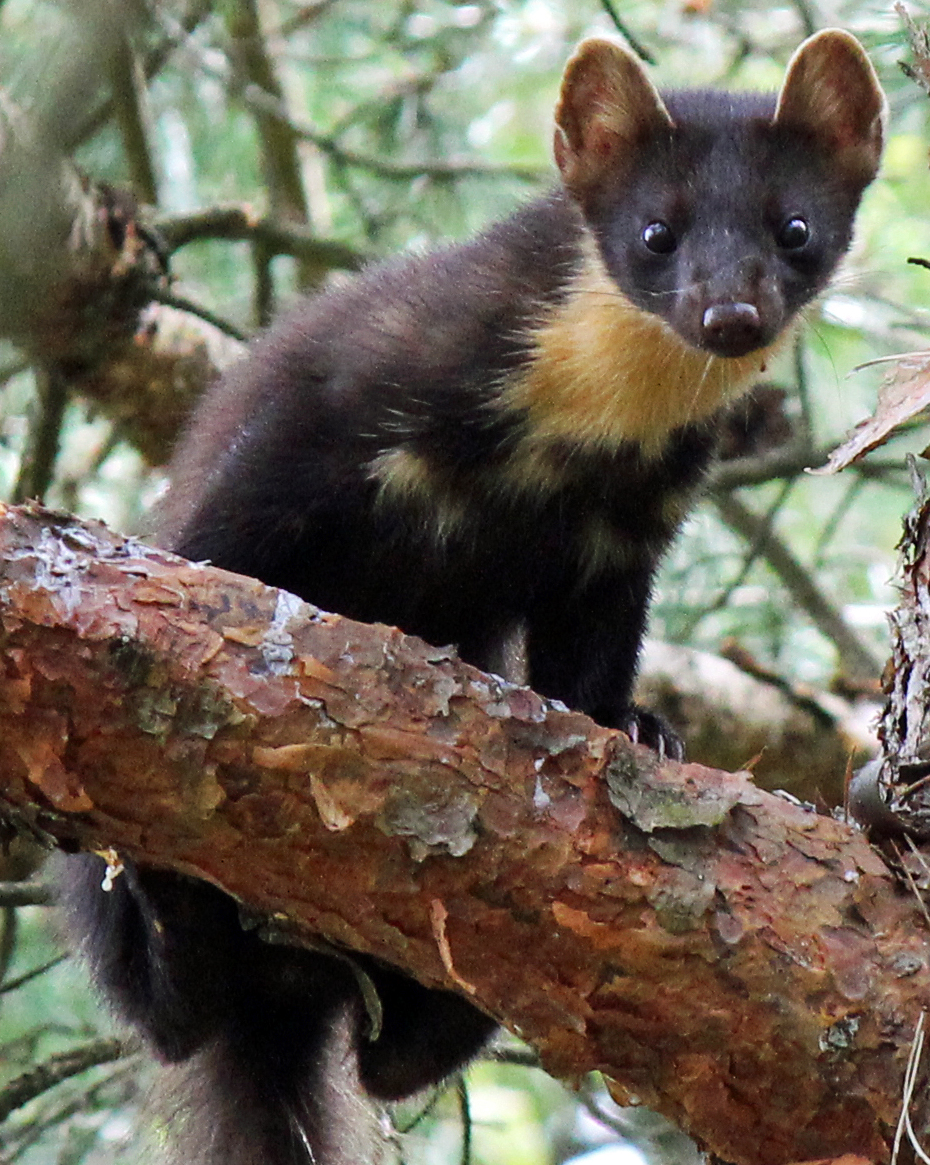
European pine marten

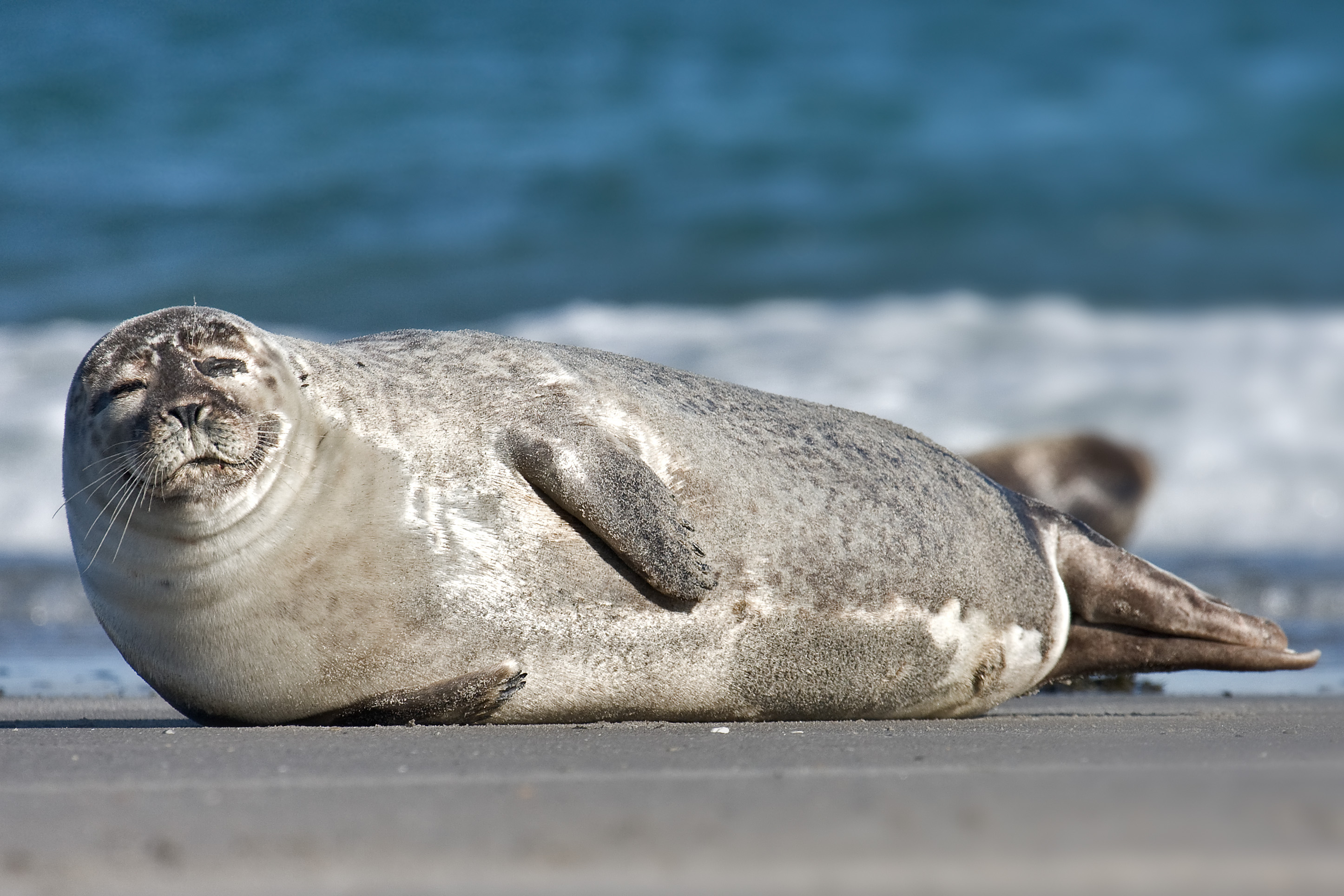
Harbour seal

There are over 260 species of carnivorans, the majority of which feed primarily on meat. They have a characteristic skull shape and dentition.

=== Family: Canidae ===
- Grey wolf, Canis lupus LC (varg)
- Common raccoon dog, Nyctereutes procyonoides LC introduced (mårdhund)
- Arctic fox, Vulpes lagopus LC (fjällräv)
- Red fox, Vulpes vulpes LC (rödräv)

=== Family: Ursidae ===
- Brown bear, Ursus arctos LC (brunbjörn)

=== Family: Felidae ===
- Eurasian lynx, Lynx lynx LC (lodjur)

=== Family: Mustelidae ===
- Wolverine, Gulo gulo LC (järv)
- Eurasian otter, Lutra lutra NT (utter)
- European pine marten, Martes martes LC (mård)
- European badger, Meles meles LC (grävling)
- Stoat, Mustela erminea LC (hermelin)
- Least weasel, Mustela nivalis LC (vessla)
- European polecat, Mustela putorius LC (iller)
- American mink, Neogale vison LC introduced

(mink)

=== Family: Phocidae ===
- Grey seal, Halichoerus grypus LC (gråsäl)
- Harbour seal, Phoca vitulina LC (knubbsäl)
- Ringed seal, Pusa hispida LC (vikare)

== Whales, dolphins and porpoises ==
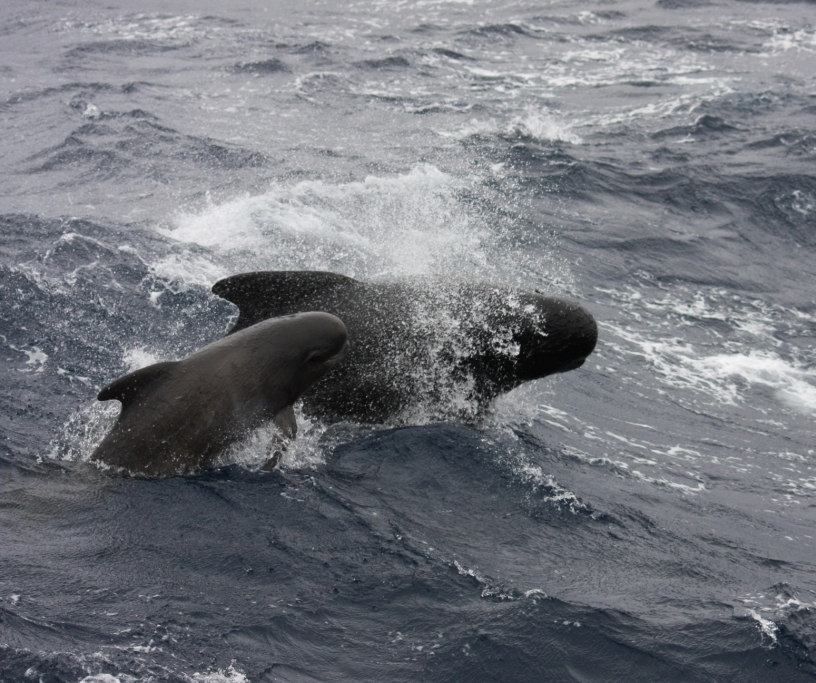
Long-finned pilot whale

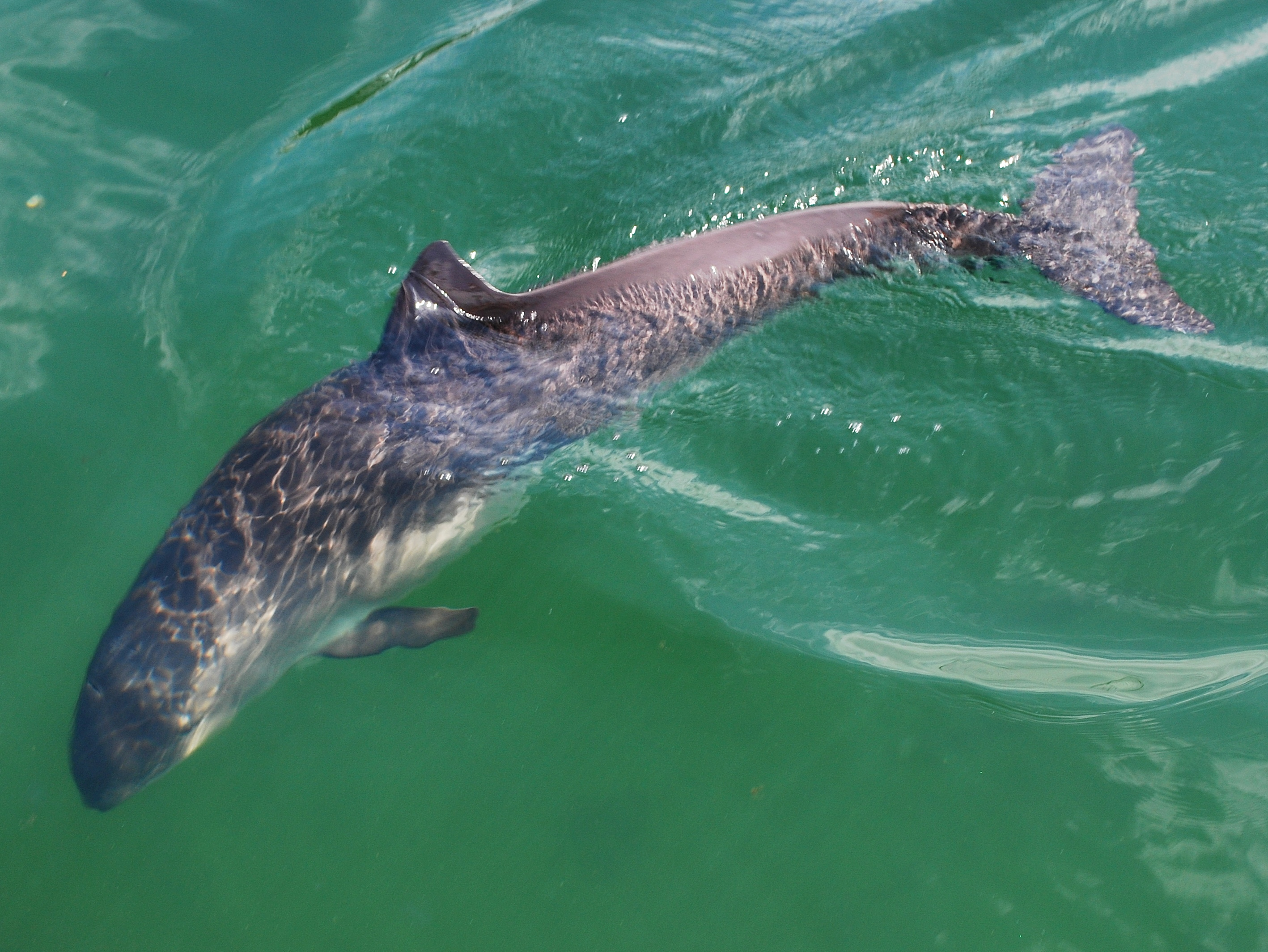
Harbour porpoise

The order Cetacea includes whales, dolphins and porpoises. They are the mammals most fully adapted to aquatic life with a spindle-shaped nearly hairless body, protected by a thick layer of blubber, and forelimbs and tail modified to provide propulsion underwater.

=== Family: Balaenopteridae ===
- Common minke whale, Balaenoptera acutorostrata LC (vikval)
- Fin whale, Balaenoptera physalus EN (sillval)
- Humpback whale, Megaptera novaeangliae LC (knölval)

=== Family: Delphinidae ===
- Orca Orcinus orca (späckhuggare)
- Long-finned pilot whale, Globicephala melas DD (långfenad grindval)
- Risso's dolphin, Grampus griseus LC (rissos delfin)
- Atlantic white-sided dolphin, Lagenorhynchus acutus LC (vitsiding)
- White-beaked dolphin, Lagenorhynchus albirostris LC (vitnosdelfin)
- Common bottlenose dolphin, Tursiops truncatus LC (öresvin)

=== Family: Monodontidae ===
- Beluga whale, Delphinapterus leucas LC (vitval)

=== Family: Phocoenidae ===
- Harbour porpoise, Phocoena phocoena LC (tumlare)

=== Family: Ziphiidae ===
- North Atlantic bottlenose whale, Hyperoodon ampullatus DD (nordlig näbbval)
- Sowerby's beaked whale, Mesoplodon bidens DD (Sowerbys näbbval)
- Cuvier's beaked whale, Ziphius cavirostris LC (småhuvudval)

== Bats ==
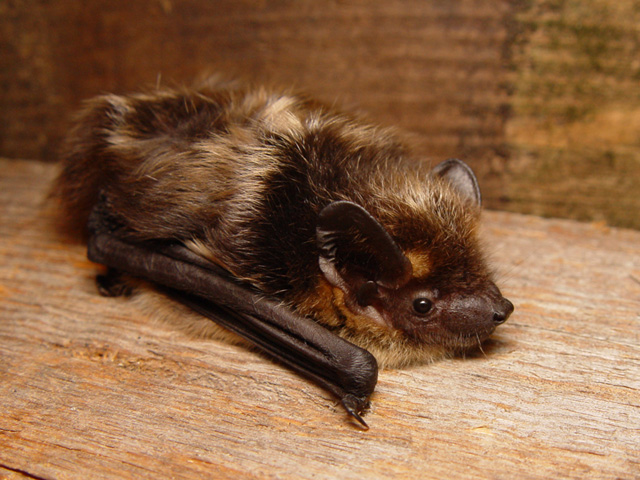
Northern bat

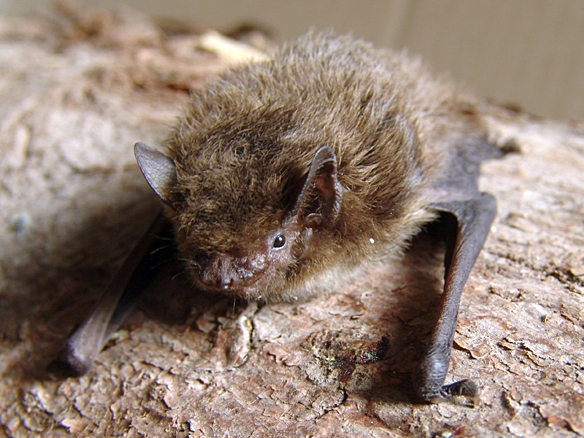
Nathusius' pipistrelle

Bats are members of the order Chiroptera. The most distinguishing feature of bats is that their forelimbs are developed as wings, making them the only mammals capable of flight. Bat species account for about 20% of all mammals.

=== Family: Vespertilionidae ===
- Western barbastelle, Barbastella barbastellus NT (barbastell)
- Northern bat, Eptesicus nilssonii LC (nordfladdermus)
- Serotine, Eptesicus serotinus LC (sydfladdermus)
- Bechstein's bat, Myotis bechsteinii NT (Bechsteins fladdermus)
- Brandt's bat, Myotis brandtii LC (taigafladdermus)
- Pond bat, Myotis dasycneme NT (dammfladdermus)
- Daubenton's bat, Myotis daubentonii LC (vattenfladdermus)
- Greater mouse-eared bat, Myotis myotis LC (större musöra)
- Whiskered bat, Myotis mystacinus LC (mustaschfladdermus)
- Natterer's bat, Myotis nattereri LC (fransfladdermus)
- Lesser noctule, Nyctalus leisleri LC (mindre brunfladdermus)
- Common noctule, Nyctalus noctula LC (större brunfladdermus)
- Nathusius' pipistrelle, Pipistrellus nathusii LC (trollpipistrell)
- Common pipistrelle, Pipistrellus pipistrellus LC (sydpipistrell)
- Soprano pipistrelle, Pipistrellus pygmaeus LC (dvärgpipistrell)
- Brown long-eared bat, Plecotus auritus LC (brunlångöra)
- Grey long-eared bat, Plecotus austriacus LC (grålångöra)
- Parti-coloured bat, Vespertilio murinus LC (gråskimlig fladdermus)

== Lagomorphs ==
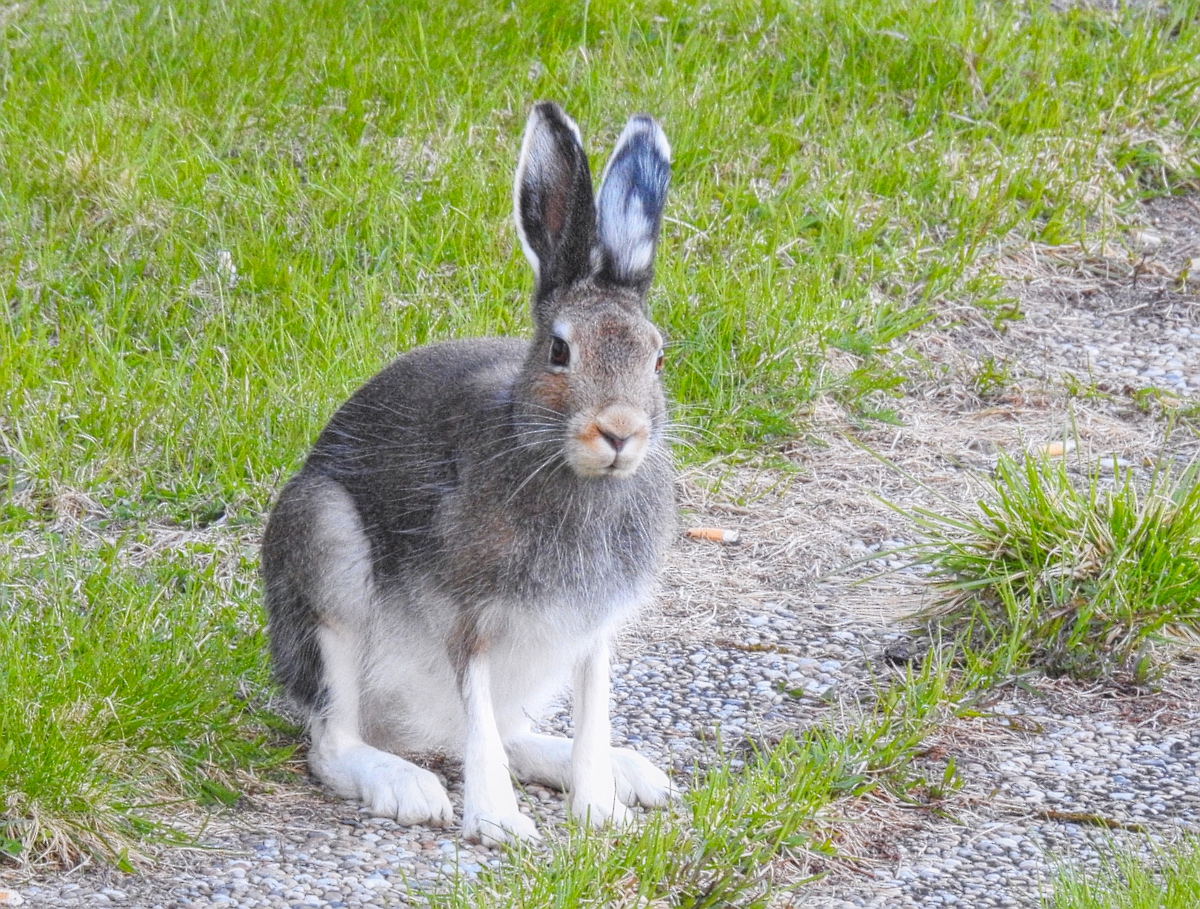
Mountain hare

The lagomorphs comprise two families, Leporidae (hares and rabbits), and Ochotonidae (pikas). Though they can resemble rodents, and were classified as a superfamily in that order until the early 20th century, they have since been considered a separate order. They differ from rodents in a number of physical characteristics, such as having four incisors in the upper jaw rather than two.

=== Family: Leporidae ===
- European hare, Lepus europaeus LC introduced (fälthare)
- Mountain hare, Lepus timidus LC (skogshare)
- European rabbit, Oryctolagus cuniculus EN introduced (vildkanin)

== Rodents ==
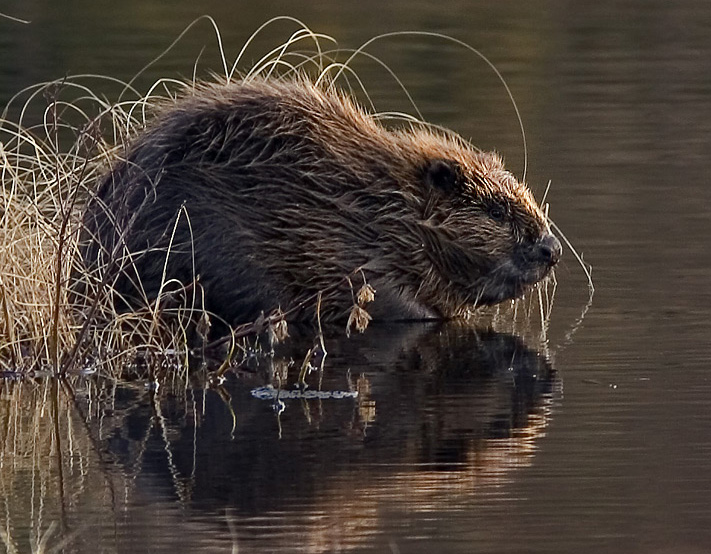
Eurasian beaver

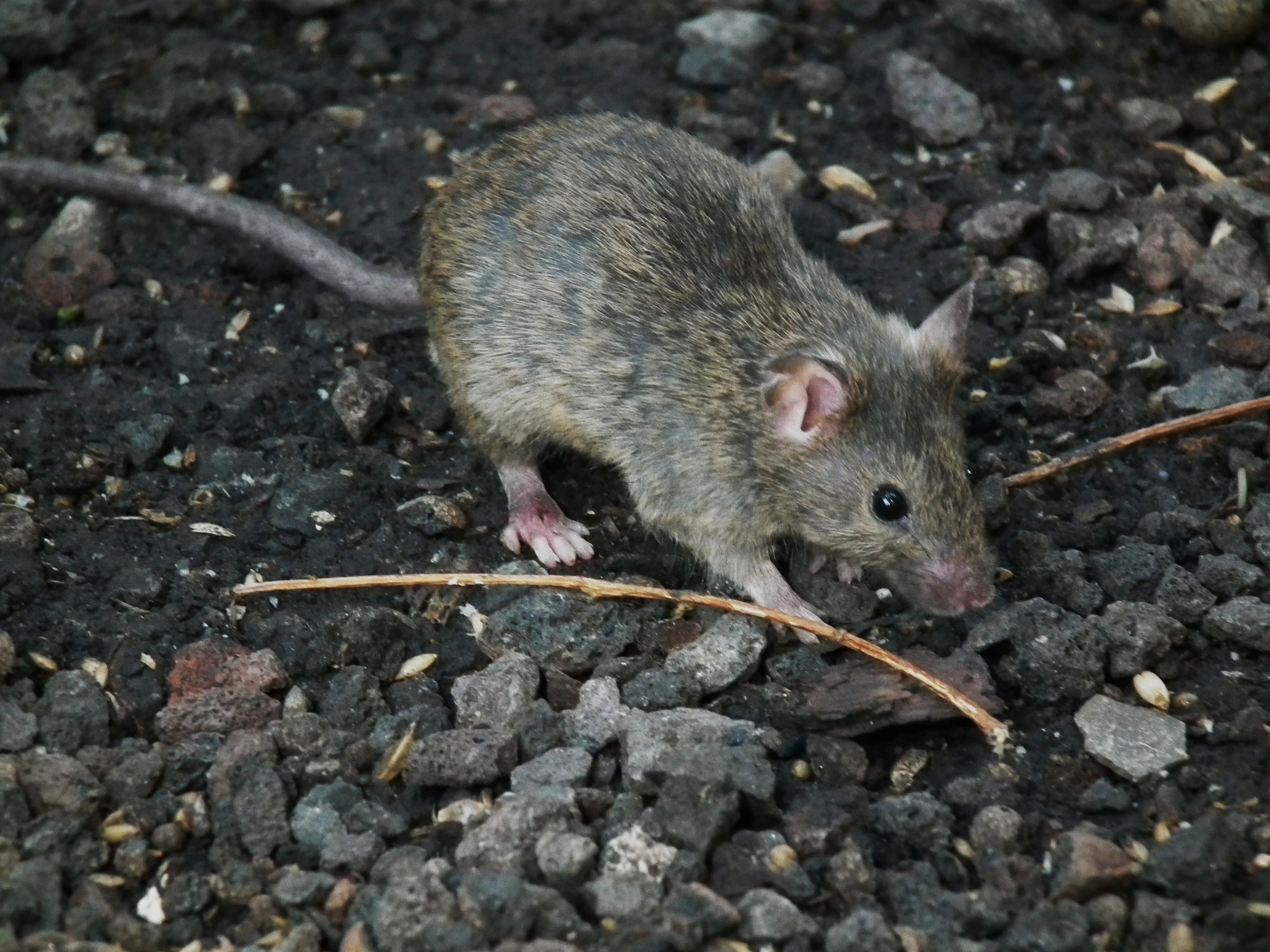
House mouse

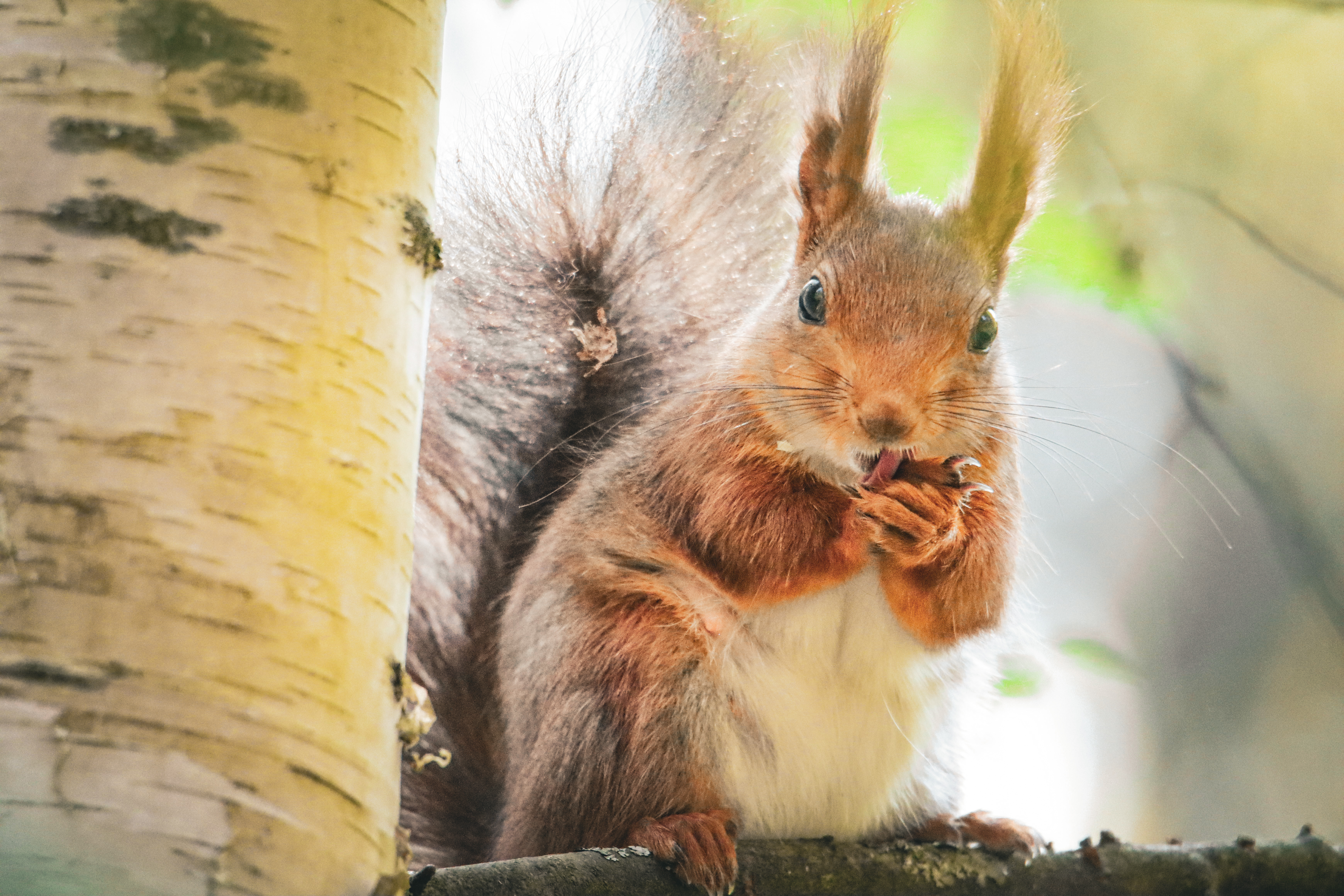
Eurasian red squirrel

Rodents are members of the order Rodentia. Rodents make up the largest order of mammals, with over 40% of mammalian species. They have two incisors in the upper and lower jaw which grow continually and must be kept short by gnawing. Most rodents are small though the capybara can weigh up to 45 kg (99 lb).

=== Family: Castoridae ===
- Eurasian beaver, Castor fiber LC (bäver)

=== Family: Cricetidae ===
- European water vole, Arvicola amphibius LC (vattensork)
- Norway lemming, Lemmus lemmus LC (fjällämmel)
- Field vole, Microtus agrestis LC (åkersork)
- Tundra vole, Microtus oeconomus LC (mellansork)
- Bank vole, Myodes glareolus LC (långsvansad skogssork)
- Grey red-backed vole, Myodes rufocanus LC (gråsiding)
- Northern red-backed vole, Myodes rutilus LC (rödsork)
- Wood lemming, Myopus schisticolor LC (skogslämmel)
- Muskrat, Ondatra zibethicus LC introduced (bisam)

=== Family: Sminthidae ===
- Northern birch mouse, Sicista betulina LC (buskmus)

=== Family: Gliridae ===
- Hazel dormouse, Muscardinus avellanarius LC (hasselmus)

=== Family: Muridae ===
- Yellow-necked mouse, Apodemus flavicollis LC (större skogsmus)
- Wood mouse, Apodemus sylvaticus LC (mindre skogsmus)
- Eurasian harvest mouse, Micromys minutus LC (dvärgmus)
- House mouse, Mus musculus LC (husmus)
- Brown rat, Rattus norvegicus LC introduced (brunråtta)
- Black rat, Rattus rattus LC introduced (svartråtta)

=== Family: Sciuridae ===
- Eurasian red squirrel, Sciurus vulgaris LC (ekorre)

== Shrews, hedgehogs and moles ==
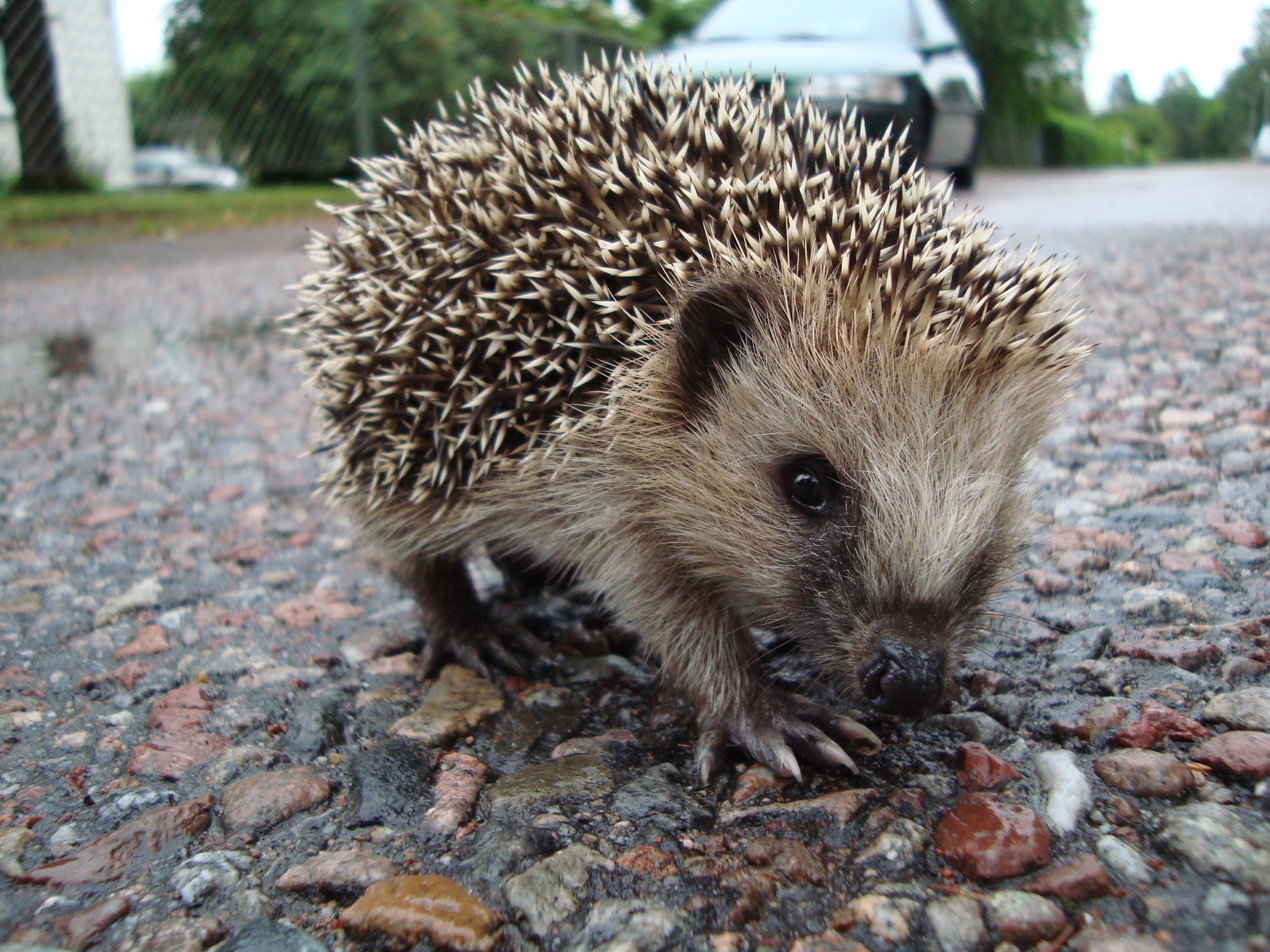
Western European hedgehog

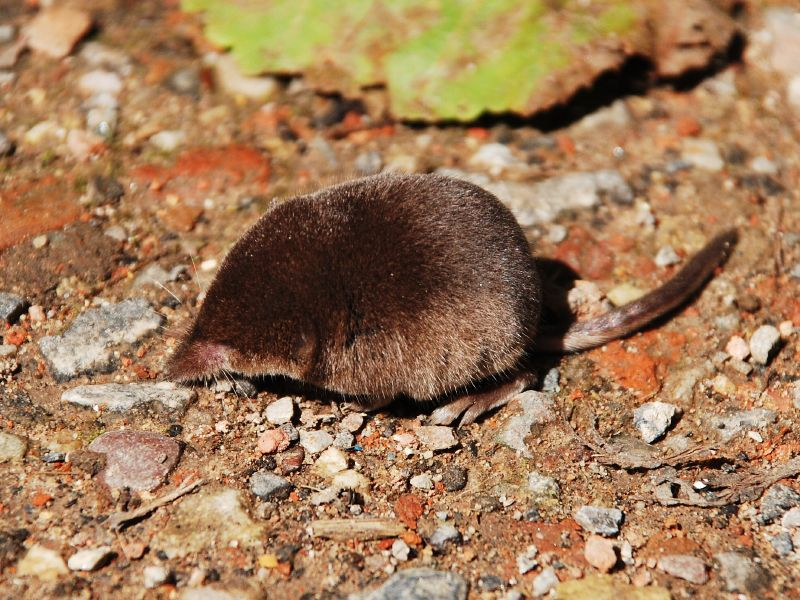
Eurasian pygmy shrew

Eulipotyphlans are insectivorous mammals. Shrews and solenodons resemble mice, hedgehogs carry spines, gymnures look more like large rats, while moles are stout-bodied burrowers.

=== Family: Erinaceidae ===
- Western European hedgehog, Erinaceus europaeus LC (igelkott)

=== Family: Soricidae ===
- Eurasian water shrew, Neomys fodiens LC (vattennäbbmus)
- Common shrew, Sorex araneus LC (vanlig näbbmus)
- Laxmann's shrew, Sorex caecutiens LC (lappnäbbmus)
- Even-toothed shrew, Sorex isodon LC (taiganäbbmus)
- Eurasian least shrew, Sorex minutissimus LC (mindre dvärgnäbbmus)
- Eurasian pygmy shrew, Sorex minutus LC (dvärgnäbbmus)

=== Family: Talpidae ===
- European mole, Talpa europaea LC (mullvad)

== See also ==
- List of birds of Sweden
- List of chordate orders
- Lists of mammals by region
- List of prehistoric mammals
- Mammal classification
- Mammals described in the 2000s
