= Tsimlyansk birch mouse =

Conservation status
- Near Threatened (IUCN 3.1)

Scientific classification
- Kingdom: Animalia
- Phylum: Chordata
- Class: Mammalia
- Order: Rodentia
- Family: Sminthidae
- Genus: Sicista
- Species: S. cimlanica

Binomial name
- Sicista cimlanica Kovalskaya, Tikhonov, Tikhonova, Surov & Bogomolov, 2000

Species of rodent

The Tsimlyansk birch mouse (Sicista cimlanica) is a species of rodent in the family Sminthidae, the birch mice. It is native to Ukraine and southwestern Russia and lives in sandy dry steppe grasslands. The species' range has been described as restricted, having been found only on the left banks of the Donets river. Its closest relative is the Hungarian birch mouse (S. trizona). Because it occupies a small, severely fragmented range, the species is considered near threatened by the International Union for Conservation of Nature.

Before 2020, the Tsimlyansk birch mouse was considered to be a subspecies of Severtzov's birch mouse, Sicista severtzovi cimlanica. It was reclassified as a subspecies of the southern birch mouse (S. subtilis) in 2017, and only became accepted as a species on its own after genetic analysis of S. subtilis was performed in 2020.
