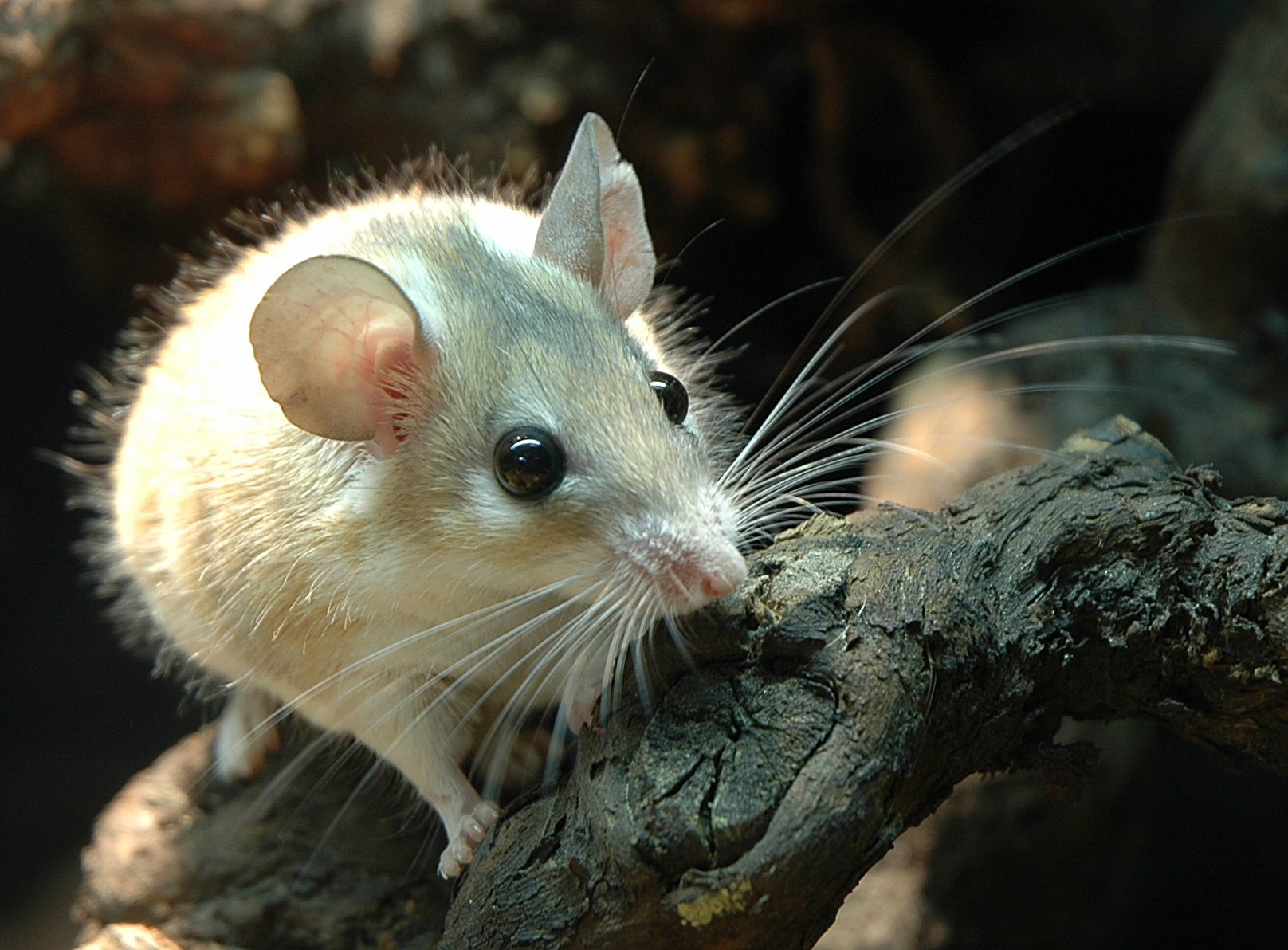
- Eastern spiny mouse (Acomys dimidiatus)

Scientific classification
- Domain: Eukaryota
- Kingdom: Animalia
- Phylum: Chordata
- Class: Mammalia
- Order: Rodentia
- Suborder: Myomorpha; Brandt, 1855

Superfamilies
- Muroidea; Dipodoidea

Synonyms
- Murimorpha

= Myomorpha =

Myomorpha Temporal range: 47.8–0 Ma Ypresian - Recent

Suborder of rodents

The suborder Myomorpha contains 1,524 species of mouse-like rodents, nearly a quarter of all mammal species. Included are mice, rats, gerbils, hamsters, lemmings, and voles. They are grouped according to the structure of their jaws and molar teeth. They are characterized by their myomorphous zygomasseteric system, which means that both their medial and lateral masseter muscles are displaced forward, making them adept at gnawing. As in the hystricognathous rodents, the medial masseter muscle goes through the eye socket, a feature unique among mammals. Myomorphs are found worldwide (apart from Antarctica) in almost all land habitats. They are usually nocturnal seed-eaters.

Most myomorph species belong to the superfamily Muroidea: (hamsters, voles, lemmings, true mice, true rats, and gerbils).

- Superfamily Muroidea
  - Family Platacanthomyidae (spiny dormice and Chinese pygmy dormice)
  - Family Spalacidae (blind mole-rats and bamboo rats)
  - Family Calomyscidae (mouse-like hamsters)
  - Family Nesomyidae (Malagasy mice and rats and African climbing mice)
  - Family Cricetidae (true hamsters, voles and lemmings)
  - Family Muridae (true rats, true mice and gerbils)
- Superfamily Dipodoidea
  - Family Dipodidae (jerboas)
  - Family Sminthidae (birch mice)
  - Family Zapodidae (jumping mice)

Historically, the definition of the suborder Myomorpha has included one or both of:

- Superfamily Geomyoidea (gophers and kangaroo rats)
  - Family Heteromyidae (kangaroo rats)
  - Family Geomyidae (gophers)
- Superfamily Gliroidea (true dormice)
  - Family Gliridae
