= Tien Shan birch mouse =

Conservation status
- Least Concern (IUCN 3.1)

Scientific classification
- Kingdom: Animalia
- Phylum: Chordata
- Class: Mammalia
- Order: Rodentia
- Family: Sminthidae
- Genus: Sicista
- Species: S. tianshanica

Binomial name
- Sicista tianshanica (Salensky, 1903)

Species of rodent

The Tien Shan birch mouse (Sicista tianshanica) is a species of rodent in the family Sminthidae. It is found in China, Kazakhstan and Kyrgyzstan.

== Description ==
The Tien Shan birch mouse grows to a length of about 70 mm (2.8 in) with a tail length of about one and a half times its body length. The dorsal fur is a uniform yellowish-grey and there is no vertebral stripe as there is in the long-tailed birch mouse (Sicista caudata). The flanks are straw-coloured, the chin and throat are white and the underparts whitish-grey tinged with buff. The back of the skull is longer than that of the southern birch mouse (Sicista subtilis).

== Distribution and habitat ==
The Tien Shan birch mouse is native to China, Kazakhstan and Kyrgyzstan. Its typical habitat is piedmont plains, mountain forests, alpine meadows and forest borders.

== Behaviour ==
The Tien Shan birch mouse does not have the specialised limbs of the Dipodidae, but still moved primarily by jumping. The long tail is semi-prehensile and assists it by winding round small branches when it scrambles about in bushes and low vegetation. It is primarily nocturnal, being particularly active at dusk. It feeds mainly on insects, molluscs and earthworms early in the year, moving on to a diet of berries and seeds in the summer and autumn. It hibernates for a long period, depending on location. In the Issyk-kul region it is only active between May and October. One litter of three to seven young is born around mid-summer.

== Status ==
The Tien Shan birch mouse has a wide range and is locally abundant, though its population fluctuates considerably. No specific threats have been identified and there are several protected areas within its distribution range, so the International Union for Conservation of Nature has assessed it as being of "least concern".
