= Simimyidae =

Simimyidae Temporal range: Middle to Late Eocene

Scientific classification
- Kingdom: Animalia
- Phylum: Chordata
- Class: Mammalia
- Order: Rodentia
- Superfamily: Dipodoidea
- Family: †Simimyidae; A. E. Wood, 1980

Genera
- †Simimys †Nonomys

Extinct family of rodents

Simimyidae is a family of extinct rodents from North America.
