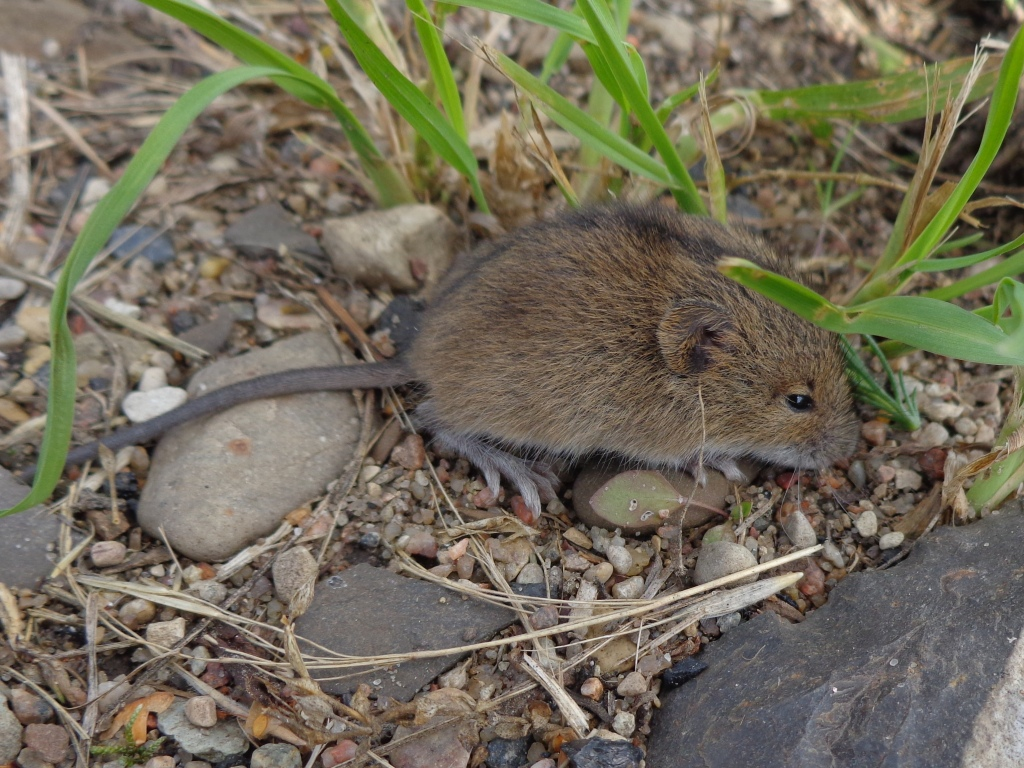
- Northern birch mouse (Sicista betulina)

Scientific classification
- Kingdom: Animalia
- Phylum: Chordata
- Class: Mammalia
- Order: Rodentia
- Family: Sminthidae
- Genus: Sicista; J. E. Gray, 1827

Type species
- Mus subtilis Pallas, 1773

Species
- See text
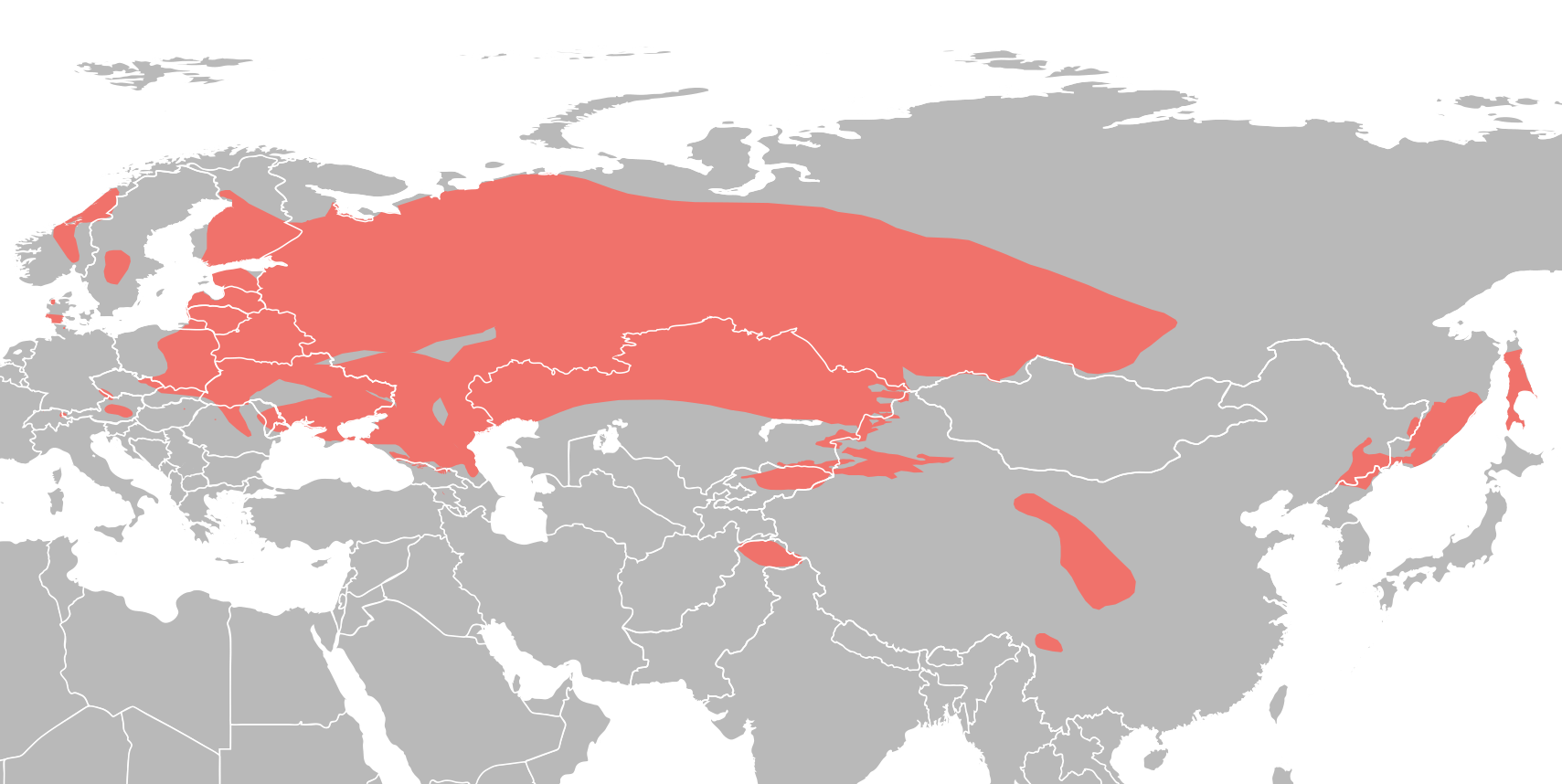
- Sicista distribution

= Birch mouse =

Birch mice

Genus of rodents

Birch mice (genus Sicista) are small jumping rodents that resemble mice with long, tufted tails and very long hind legs, allowing for remarkable leaps. They are the only extant members of the family Sminthidae. They were formerly classified as part of the subfamily Sicistinae in the family Dipodidae alongside the jerboas and jumping mice. However, phylogenetic evidence supports all three of these belonging to distinct families, thus leaving only the jerboas in Dipodidae and promoting Sicistinae to its own family.

They are native to Eurasian forests, shrublands, and grasslands, and have a vast geographic distribution. They dig shallow burrows in which they build nests from grass, and are typically active at night. They use their large feet to jump and climb on bushes and shrubs, using their toes and tails to cling to branches. Birch mice are omnivores and primarily eat seeds, berries, and insects. They hibernate during the winter, losing a great deal of weight in the process. They are all of a similar small size with relatively long tail lengths.

Sicista contains several species, though population estimates are limited, the International Union for Conservation of Nature (IUCN) categorises multiple as endangered or critically endangered.

== Taxonomy ==
Sicista is the only extant genus in the rodent family Sminthidae. It was first identified as a distinct genus from the Mus genus of mice by British zoologist John Edward Gray in an 1827 English edition by Edward Griffith of Le Règne Animal. It was formerly classified as part of the subfamily Sicistinae in the family Dipodidae alongside the jerboas and jumping mice, but beginning in 1971 there were proposals based on karyotypic evidence to split the family into three, with jerboas remaining in Dipodidae, the jumping mouse subfamily Zapodinae promoted to the family Zapodidae, and the birch mouse subfamily promoted to the family Sminthidae. Supporting phylogenetic evidence presented in the 2010s resulted in the split being adopted.

Sminthidae and its two sibling families make up the superfamily Dipodoidea. It is one of the two superfamilies in the suborder Myomorpha, which collectively contains over 1,500 species of mouse-like rodents, more than half of the entire order Rodentia.

== Characteristics ==
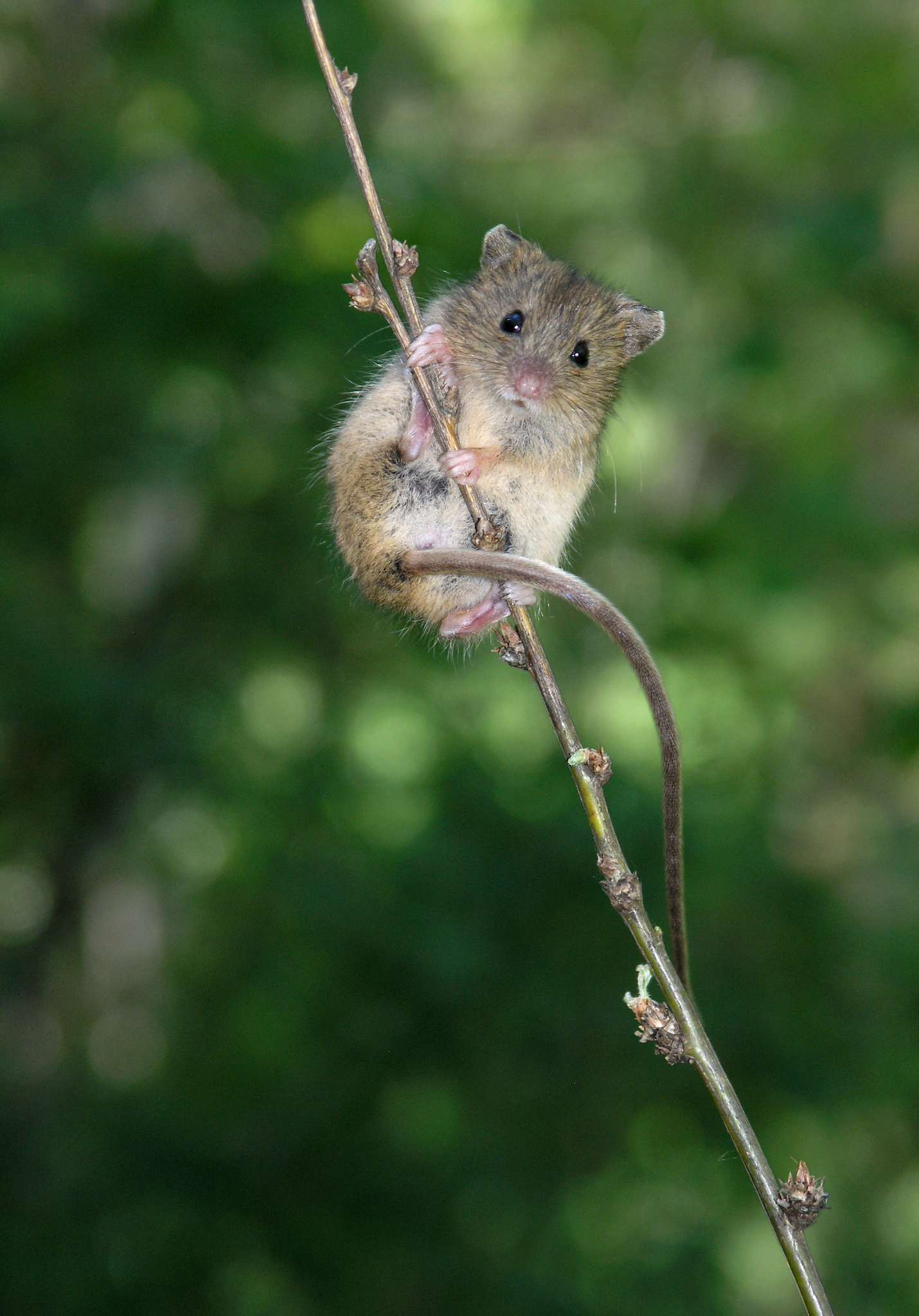
Northern birch mouse (Sicista betulina) gripping a branch with its feet and tail

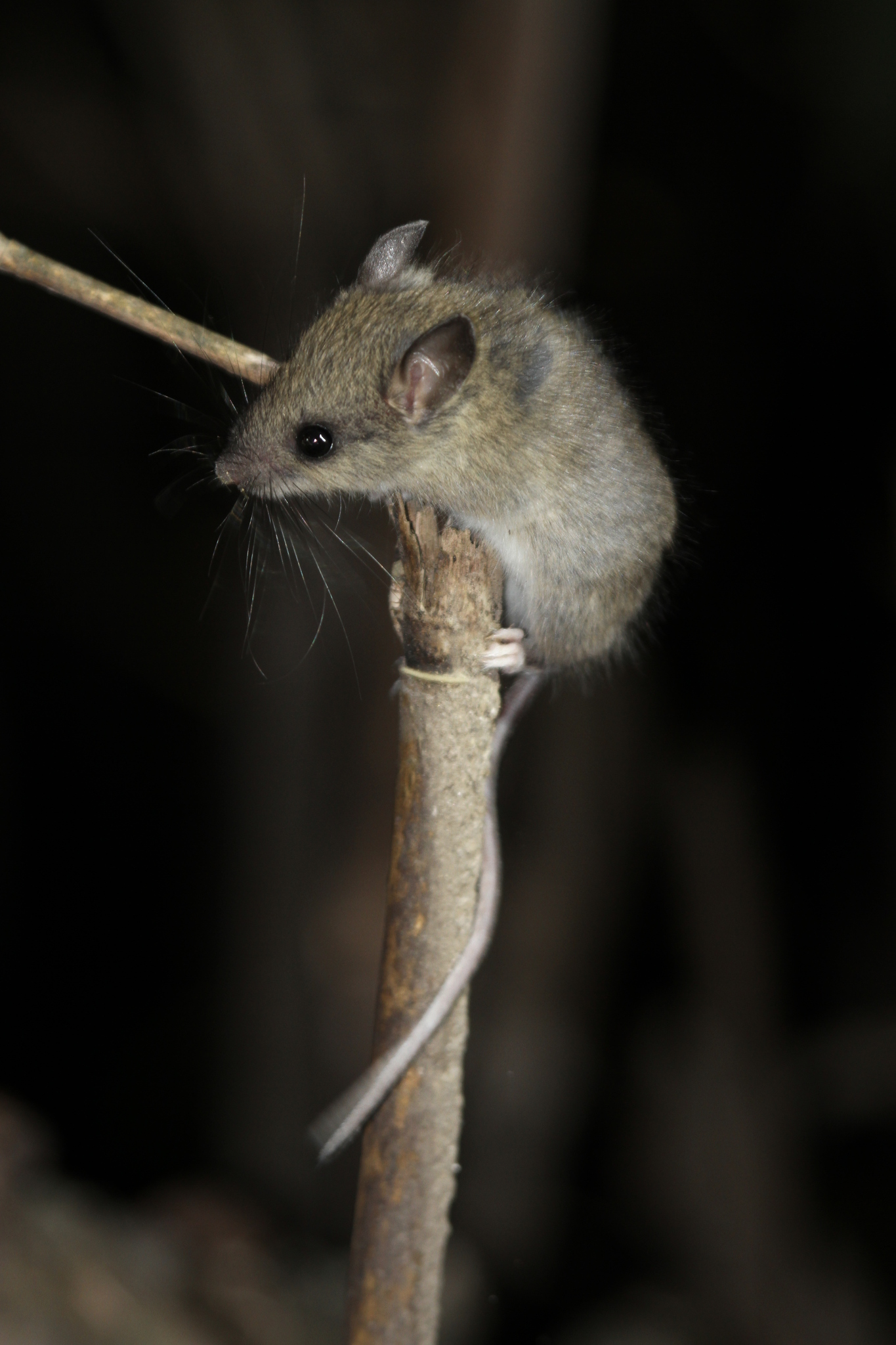
Chinese birch mouse (Sicista concolor)

Birch mice are small, mouselike rodents with a long and semi-prehensile tail. They have large feet, but unlike the related jerboas and jumping mice, they do not have elongated legs. Their skin colour is light brown or dark-brown to brownish yellow on the upper side and paler on the underside, but generally brownish. Some species have a dark dorsal stripe down the head and back. Birch mice are found in Asia and Europe in a vast geographic distribution, primarily in forests, shrublands, and grasslands, though some species can be found in wetlands. Although they have a diverse region of areas, their molecular and anatomical markers suggest that birch mice originated from Central Asia.

They dig shallow burrows in which they build oval nests out of grass and plant stems. Birch mice are typically active at night, and travel by jumping and climbing on bushes and shrubs, using their toes and tails to cling to branches. They hibernate for at least six months of the year, with some species such as the northern birch mouse migrating from meadows in the warm months to forests for the winter.

Birch mice are omnivores and primarily eat seeds, berries, and insects. They lose a remarkable amount of weight during hibernation, with the northern birch mouse falling from approximately 12 to 6 grams over the course of the winter. They are all of a similar size, ranging from 4–8 cm (2–3 in) long, with tail lengths ranging from 6–12 cm (2–5 in). Weights range from 5–13 g (0.2–0.5 oz).

== Species ==
Mammal Species of the World (2005) listed thirteen species of birch mice. This has been augmented since by generally accepted proposals made since using molecular phylogenetic analysis, resulting in sixteen total species being accepted by both the American Society of Mammalogists (ASM) and the International Union for Conservation of Nature (IUCN). All species of Sicista cluster into five major lineages: S. betulina, S. caucasica, S. caudata, S. tianschanica, and S. concolor.

- Armenian birch mouse, Sicista armenica
- Northern birch mouse, Sicista betulina
- Caucasian birch mouse, Sicista caucasica
- Long-tailed birch mouse, Sicista caudata
- Tsimlyansk birch mouse, Sicista cimlanica
- Chinese birch mouse, Sicista concolor
- Kazbeg birch mouse, Sicista kazbegica
- Kluchor birch mouse, Sicista kluchorica
- Nordmann's birch mouse, Sicista loriger
- Altai birch mouse, Sicista napaea
- Gray birch mouse, Sicista pseudonapaea
- Severtzov's birch mouse, Sicista severtzovi
- Strand's birch mouse, Sicista strandi
- Southern birch mouse, Sicista subtilis
- Tien Shan birch mouse, Sicista tianshanica
- Hungarian birch mouse, Sicista trizona
- Zhetysu birch mouse, Sicista zhetysuica

Two additional species have been proposed and have been accepted by the ASM but are not recognised as species by the IUCN.

- Talgar birch mouse, Sicista talgarica
- Terskey birch mouse, Sicista terskeica

Of the sixteen species recognised by the IUCN, none have population estimates, but the Hungarian birch mouse and Kazbeg birch mouse are classified as endangered, while the Armenian birch mouse, Nordmann's birch mouse, and Severtzov's birch mouse are categorised as critically endangered.
