= Sicista zhetysuica =

Conservation status
- Least Concern (IUCN 3.1)

Scientific classification
- Kingdom: Animalia
- Phylum: Chordata
- Class: Mammalia
- Order: Rodentia
- Family: Sminthidae
- Genus: Sicista
- Species: S. zhetysuica

Binomial name
- Sicista zhetysuica Cserkész, Fülöp, Almerekova, Kondor, Laczkó & Sramkó, 2019

Species of mammal

Sicista zhetysuica, the Zhetysu birch mouse, is a rodent species native to China and Kazakhstan.
