= Kluchor birch mouse =

Conservation status
- Least Concern (IUCN 3.1)

Scientific classification
- Kingdom: Animalia
- Phylum: Chordata
- Class: Mammalia
- Order: Rodentia
- Family: Sminthidae
- Genus: Sicista
- Species: S. kluchorica

Binomial name
- Sicista kluchorica Sokolov, Kovalskaya & Baskevich, 1980

Species of rodent

The Kluchor birch mouse (Sicista kluchorica) is a species of rodent in the family Sminthidae. It is endemic to Russia. Its natural habitat is temperate forests.
