= Gray birch mouse =

Conservation status
- Data Deficient (IUCN 3.1)

Scientific classification
- Kingdom: Animalia
- Phylum: Chordata
- Class: Mammalia
- Order: Rodentia
- Family: Sminthidae
- Genus: Sicista
- Species: S. pseudonapaea

Binomial name
- Sicista pseudonapaea Strautman, 1949

Species of rodent

The gray birch mouse (Sicista pseudonapaea) is a species of rodent in the family Sminthidae. It is endemic to Kazakhstan, but possibly ranges into China. Its natural habitat is temperate forests.
