= Strand's birch mouse =

Conservation status
- Least Concern (IUCN 3.1)

Scientific classification
- Kingdom: Animalia
- Phylum: Chordata
- Class: Mammalia
- Order: Rodentia
- Family: Sminthidae
- Genus: Sicista
- Species: S. strandi

Binomial name
- Sicista strandi (Formozov, 1931)

Species of rodent

Strand's birch mouse (Sicista strandi) is a species of rodent in the family Sminthidae. It is endemic to Russia.
