= Kazbeg birch mouse =

Conservation status
- Vulnerable (IUCN 3.1)

Scientific classification
- Kingdom: Animalia
- Phylum: Chordata
- Class: Mammalia
- Order: Rodentia
- Family: Sminthidae
- Genus: Sicista
- Species: S. kazbegica

Binomial name
- Sicista kazbegica Sokolov, Baskevich & Kovalskaya, 1986

Species of rodent

The Kazbeg birch mouse (Sicista kazbegica) is a species of rodent in the family Sminthidae. It is found in Georgia and Russia and has a natural habitat of temperate forests.
