= Caucasian birch mouse =

Conservation status
- Near Threatened (IUCN 3.1)

Scientific classification
- Kingdom: Animalia
- Phylum: Chordata
- Class: Mammalia
- Order: Rodentia
- Family: Sminthidae
- Genus: Sicista
- Species: S. caucasica

Binomial name
- Sicista caucasica Vinogradov, 1925

Species of rodent

The Caucasian birch mouse (Sicista caucasica) is a species of rodent in the family Sminthidae, that is endemic to Russia. Reports that it occurs in Turkey probably refer to Armenian birch mouse (Sicista armenica), from which it can only be reliably distinguished on the basis of karyotype. The Caucasian birch mouse inhabits the Western Montane Caucasus area, land situated between the Black Sea and the Caspian Sea.
