= Nordmann's birch mouse =

Conservation status
- Critically Endangered (IUCN 3.1)

Scientific classification
- Kingdom: Animalia
- Phylum: Chordata
- Class: Mammalia
- Order: Rodentia
- Family: Sminthidae
- Genus: Sicista
- Species: S. loriger

Binomial name
- Sicista loriger (Nathusius, 1840)

Synonyms
- Sicista nordmanni (Keyserling & Blasius, 1840); Sicista subtilis loriger

Species of birch mouse

Nordmann's birch mouse (Sicista loriger) is a species of birch mouse in the family Sminthidae. It is named after Finnish biologist Alexander von Nordmann. It is native to eastern and southeastern Europe.

== Taxonomy ==
It was long thought to be a subspecies of the southern birch mouse (S. subtilis), but a 2016 study found sufficient genetic and anatomical divergence for it to be considered its own species.

== Distribution ==
It is restricted to the western portion of the Pontic–Caspian steppe, where it is known only from a few isolated populations in southern Ukraine, west Belgorod in Russia, and eastern Romania. In addition, it may potentially be found in Bulgaria and Moldova.

== Status ==
This species has a fragmented distribution due to its reliance on the largely developed steppe habitat. Populations in these fragmented regions also face ongoing threats from development and agriculture. Due to this, this species is classified as Critically Endangered by the IUCN Red List.
