= Altai birch mouse =

Conservation status
- Least Concern (IUCN 3.1)

Scientific classification
- Kingdom: Animalia
- Phylum: Chordata
- Class: Mammalia
- Order: Rodentia
- Family: Sminthidae
- Genus: Sicista
- Species: S. napaea

Binomial name
- Sicista napaea Hollister, 1912

Species of rodent

The Altai birch mouse (Sicista napaea) is a species of rodent in the family Sminthidae. It is native to Russia and Kazakhstan. A baby Altai birch mouse is called a 'pinkie, kitten or pup'. The females are called 'doe' and males 'buck'. A Altai birch mouse group is called a 'nest, colony, harvest, horde or mischief'.
