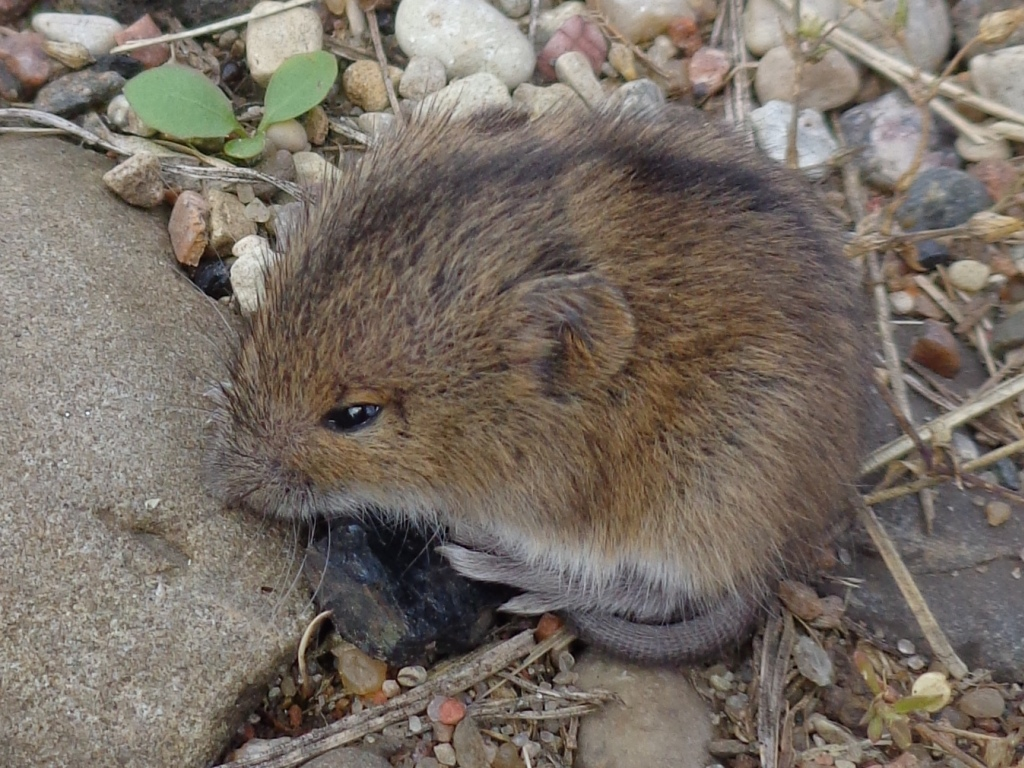
- Northern birch mouse (Sicista betulina)

Scientific classification
- Kingdom: Animalia
- Phylum: Chordata
- Class: Mammalia
- Order: Rodentia
- Superfamily: Dipodoidea
- Family: Sminthidae; Brandt, 1855

Genera
- Sicista; Breviforamen; Multiple extinct genera, see text
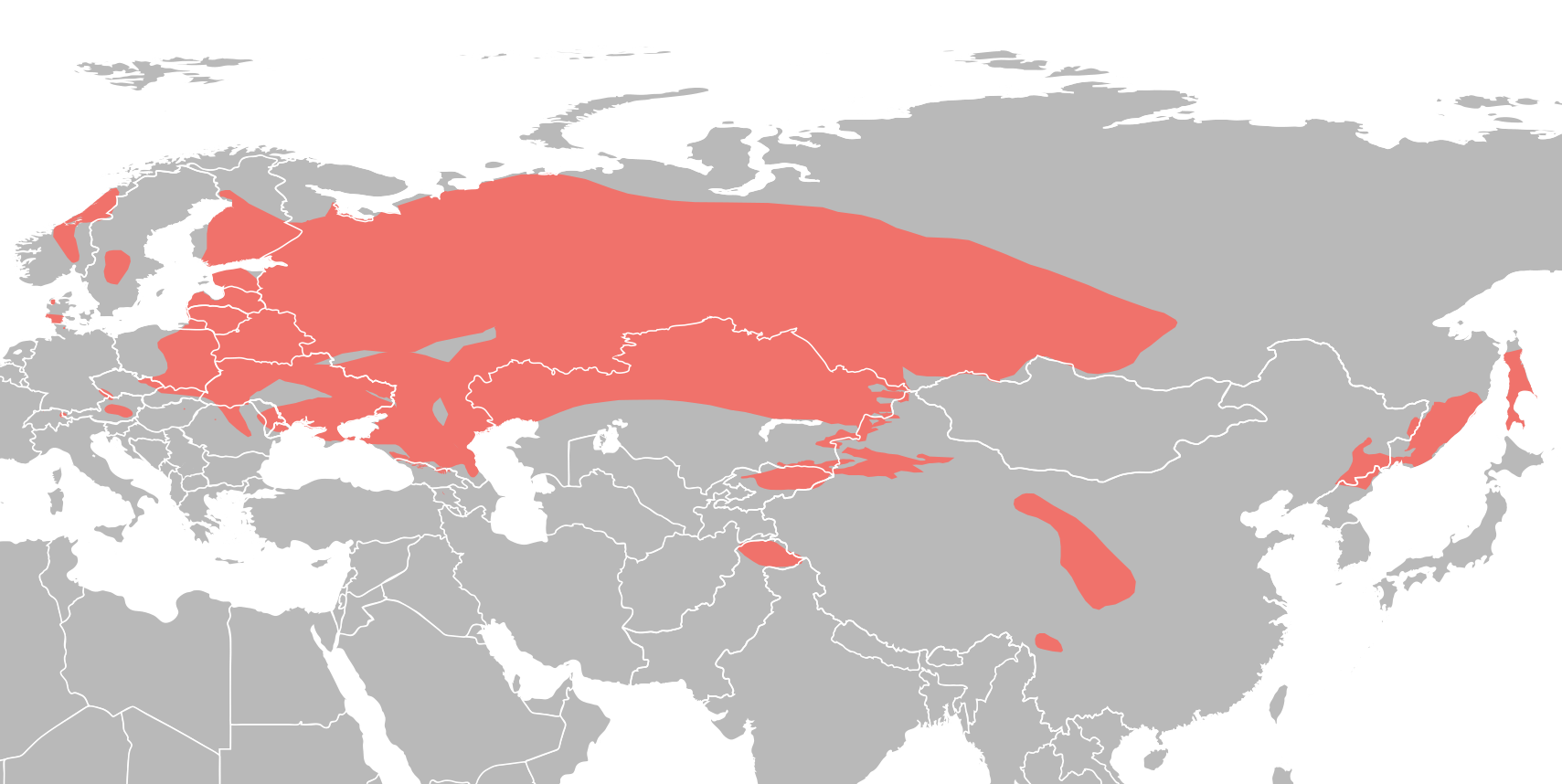
- Sminthidae distribution

Synonyms
- Sicistinae Allen, 1901

= Sminthidae =

Sminthidae Temporal range: Early Oligocene–present

Family of rodents

Sminthidae is a family of mouse-like jumping rodents. They are represented by two extant genera, Sicista and Breviforamen, represented by 24 species found throughout most of Eurasia, from central Europe east to Siberia, and south to southern China. However, they were much more diverse and had a much wider range in prehistory, having multiple genera and being found not only in Eurasia but also throughout North America, where they existed up to the early Pleistocene. They have a well-attested fossil record which dates as far back as the early Oligocene.

They were formerly classified as the subfamily Sicistinae in the family Dipodidae alongside the jerboas and jumping mice, but phylogenetic evidence supports all three of these belonging to distinct families, thus leaving only the jerboas in Dipodidae.

== Extant species ==
- Genus Sicista
  - Armenian birch mouse Sicista armenica
  - Northern birch mouse, Sicista betulina
  - Short-taild birch mouse, Sicista brevicauda
  - Caucasian birch mouse, Sicista caucasica
  - Long-tailed birch mouse, Sicista caudata
  - Tsimlyansk birch mouse, Sicista cimlanica
  - Chinese birch mouse, Sicista concolor
  - Kazbeg birch mouse, Sicista kazbegica
  - Kluchor birch mouse, Sicista kluchorica
  - Kashmir birch mouse, Sicista leathemi
  - Nordmann's birch mouse, Sicista loriger
  - Meigu birch mouse, Sicista meiguites
  - Altai birch mouse, Sicista napaea
  - Gray birch mouse, Sicista pseudonapaea
  - Severtzov's birch mouse, Sicista severtzovi
  - Strand's birch mouse, Sicista strandi
  - Southern birch mouse, Sicista subtilis
  - Talgar birch mouse, Sicista talgarica
  - Terskey birch mouse, Sicista terskeica
  - Tien Shan birch mouse, Sicista tianshanica
  - Hungarian birch mouse, Sicista trizona
  - Sichuan birch mouse, Sicista weigoldi
  - Zhetysu birch mouse, Sicista zhetysuica
- Genus Breviforamen
  - Short-foramen birch mouse, Breviforamen shannanense

== Extinct genera ==
These extinct genera are definitively known:

- Genus †Allosminthus
- Genus †Heosminthus
- Genus †Heterosminthus
- Genus †Gobiosminthus
- Genus †Lophocricetus
- Genus †Macrognathomys
- Genus †Megasminthus
- Genus †Miosicista
- Genus †Parasminthus
- Genus †Plesiosminthus
- Genus †Schaubemys
- Genus †Shamosminthus
- Genus †Sinosminthus
- Genus †Tyrannomys

The Eocene genera Primisminthus and Banyuesminthus could represent even older members of Sminthidae, although other studies speculate that they may be basal dipodoids.
