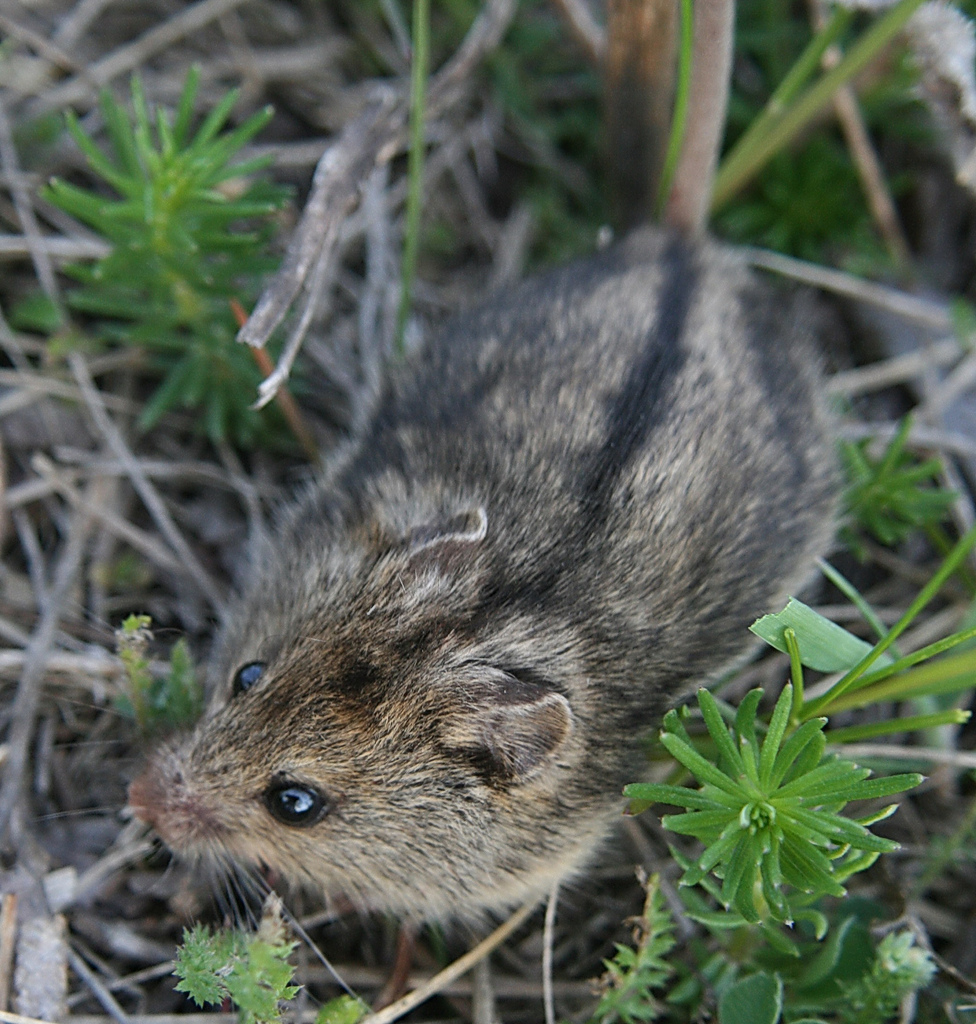
- S. t. trizona in Mezőnagymihály, Hungary

Conservation status
- Endangered (IUCN 3.1)

Scientific classification
- Kingdom: Animalia
- Phylum: Chordata
- Class: Mammalia
- Infraclass: Placentalia
- Order: Rodentia
- Family: Sminthidae
- Genus: Sicista
- Species: S. trizona

Binomial name
- Sicista trizona (Frivaldszky, 1865)

Subspecies
- S. t. trizona (Frivaldszky, 1865); S. t. transylvanica Cserkész, Rusin, & Sramkó, 2016

Synonyms
- Sicista subtilis trizona

= Hungarian birch mouse =

Species of birch mouse

The Hungarian birch mouse (Sicista trizona) is a species of birch mouse in the family Sminthidae. It was once found throughout Central Europe and Romania, but is now only known from two isolated populations in Hungary and Transylvania in Romania, each of which belongs to its own subspecies.

== Taxonomy ==
It was long thought to be a subspecies of the southern birch mouse (S. subtilis), but a 2016 study found sufficient genetic and anatomical divergence for it to be considered its own species. The same study found the Romanian population of the species to have enough genetic divergence from the Hungarian population to be described as its own subspecies, resulting in:

- Hungarian birch mouse (S. t. trizona)
- Transylvanian birch mouse (S. t. transylvanica)

== Distribution ==
The Hungarian birch mouse was formerly found throughout the Pannonian Basin, including most of Hungary, Austria, Slovakia, and Serbia. It is now thought to be extirpated from Austria and is likely also extirpated from Slovakia and Serbia. Based on records, it was likely abundant in Hungary prior to 1950, but it is now restricted to the Borsodi Mezőség Protected Landscape Area.

The Transylvanian birch mouse was likely found throughout the Transylvanian Plateau in the past, but its range has likely shrunk due to agriculture. It is known only from several locations in Cluj County. Its full range has not yet been fully established.

== Habitat and ecology ==
This species depends on undisturbed grassland habitat or grassland grazed by livestock, which has become rare due to mechanised agriculture. The Hungarian subspecies is most abundant in remnant patches of tall vegetation such as thistle in pastures that are otherwise grazed by livestock. It is also known from saline fescue meadows, wormwood-fescue steppes, and abandoned agricultural fields at lower densities. The Transylvanian subspecies is known from slopes that are highly encroached upon by shrubs, also in areas otherwise used for livestock grazing.

== Conservation ==
S. trizona is one of the rarest and least known small mammal species in Europe. The Hungarian subspecies has been extirpated from most of its range due to mechanised agriculture allowing for larger areas to be mowed at once, which reduces the diversity of plant species and makes the habitat unsuitable for the birch mice. Although some areas have been designated for the protection of the species, these protected areas are relatively small and the surrounding region is still mechanically cut or overgrazed. The Transylvanian birch mouse is also threatened by intensive agriculture, as well as overgrazing by sheep.

Both populations, which were later classified into this species, were feared to be extinct throughout most of the 20th century until being rediscovered in the 21st century; the Hungarian subspecies was not seen for over 70 years until being rediscovered in 2006, whilst the Transylvanian subspecies was only rediscovered in 2014. These threats and rarity have led to the species being classified as 'Endangered' on the IUCN Red List.
