= Long-tailed birch mouse =

Conservation status
- Data Deficient (IUCN 3.1)

Scientific classification
- Kingdom: Animalia
- Phylum: Chordata
- Class: Mammalia
- Order: Rodentia
- Family: Sminthidae
- Genus: Sicista
- Species: S. caudata

Binomial name
- Sicista caudata Thomas, 1907

Species of rodent

The long-tailed birch mouse (Sicista caudata) is a species of birch mouse found in Northeast Asia. It has been reported from the Ussuri region of Manchuria, Sakhalin Island and Primorsky Krai in Russia, and northern North Korea. It is listed as data deficient by the IUCN.

== Description ==
The long-tailed birch mouse grows to a length of about 67 mm (2.6 in) with a tail close to twice its body length. The dorsal fur is pale greyish-brown tinged with yellow and along the spine are longer hairs tipped with black forming a vertebral stripe. The flanks are paler yellowish-brown and the underparts greyish creamy-white. The tail is a uniform light yellowish-grey. The zygomatic arch is widest in the middle, the premolars are large and the back of the skull is rounded.

== Distribution and habitat ==
The long-tailed birch mouse is native to northeastern China and the Ussuri region of Russia as well as being found on Sakhalin Island. It is found in mountain taiga, in coniferous forest, in mixed forests and on steppe grassland.

== Behaviour ==
The ecology of the long-tailed birch mouse is little known. It hibernates for at least six months during the winter. It builds its nest, made of a woven ball of grass, in crevices or in bushes. Litters usually consist of four to six young. This birch mouse eats green plants, berries but mostly feeds on seeds, being chiefly active at night and spending the daytime in a shallow burrow.

== Status ==
The long-tailed birch mouse has a wide range, at least some of which is in protected areas. It is a poorly known species and in general appears to be uncommon, but it may be more plentiful than is currently realised. The population trend is unknown, so the International Union for Conservation of Nature has listed it as "data deficient".
