= Severtzov's birch mouse =

Conservation status
- Critically endangered, possibly extinct (IUCN 3.1)

Scientific classification
- Kingdom: Animalia
- Phylum: Chordata
- Class: Mammalia
- Order: Rodentia
- Family: Sminthidae
- Genus: Sicista
- Species: S. severtzovi

Binomial name
- Sicista severtzovi Ognev, 1935
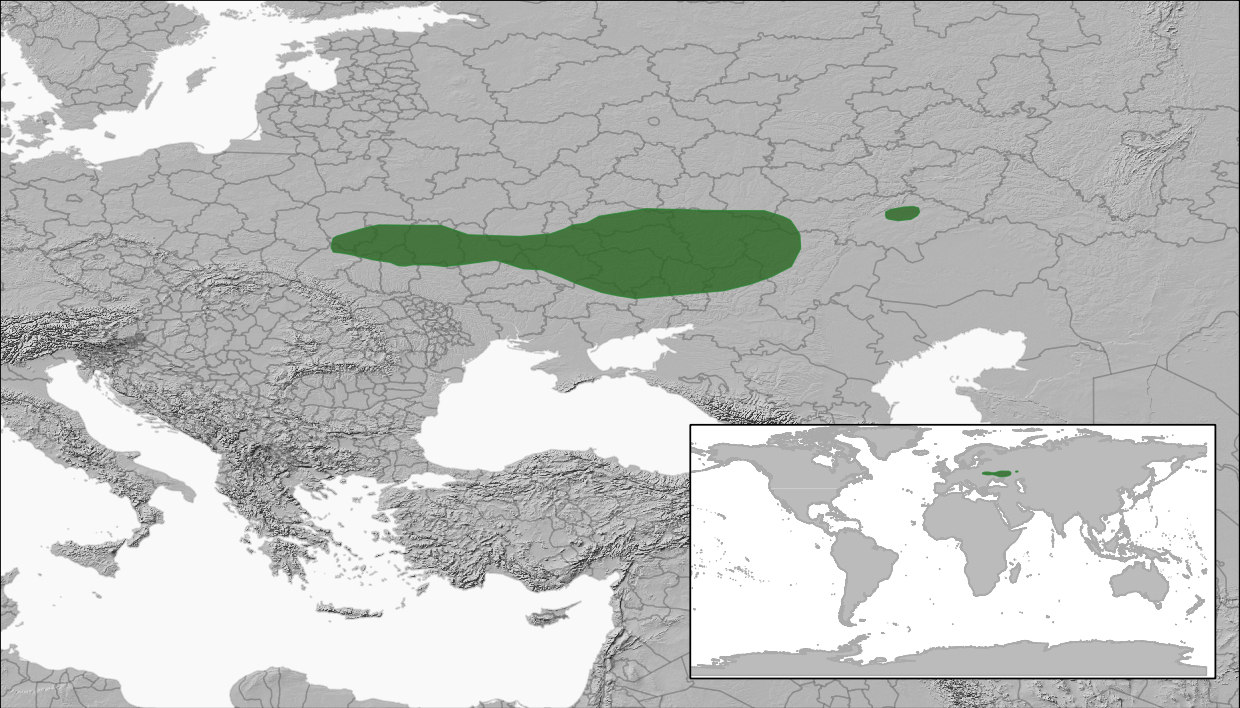

Species of rodent

The Severtzov's birch mouse, or dark birch mouse (Sicista severtzovi) is a species of rodent in the family Sminthidae. It is endemic to East-European steppes (E Ukraine and S-W Russia).
