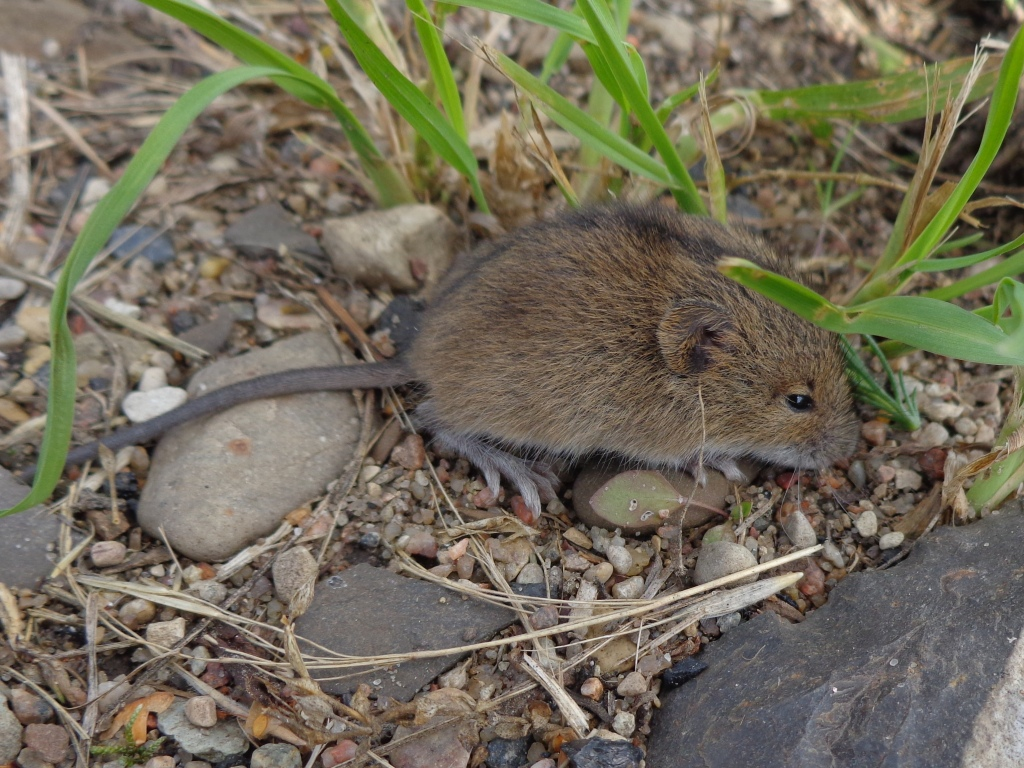

Conservation status
- Least Concern (IUCN 3.1)

Scientific classification
- Kingdom: Animalia
- Phylum: Chordata
- Class: Mammalia
- Order: Rodentia
- Family: Sminthidae
- Genus: Sicista
- Species: S. betulina

Binomial name
- Sicista betulina (Pallas, 1779)
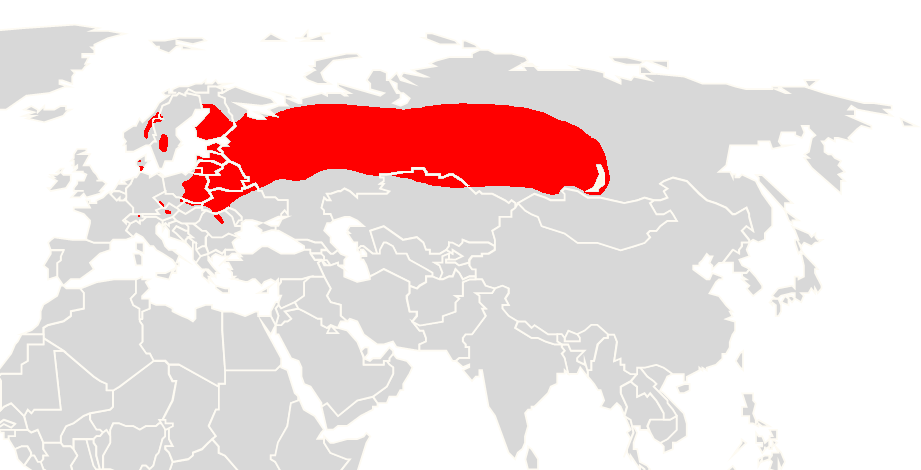

= Northern birch mouse =

Species of rodent

The northern birch mouse (Sicista betulina) is a small rodent about 5 to 8 cm (2.0 to 3.1 in) long (without the tail), weighing 5 to 13 g (0.18 to 0.46 oz). It lives in northern Europe and Asia in forest and marsh zones.

It hibernates in burrows. It eats shoots, grains, berries, and sometimes insects.

== Description ==
The northern birch mouse is a small mouse with a relatively long tail. The adult head and body length is 2 to 3 in (51 to 76 mm) with a tail of 3 to 4.25 in (76 to 108 mm). Adults vary in weight between 5 and 13 g (0.2 and 0.5 oz). The upper parts are yellowish-grey with a brown sheen and the underparts are a pale greyish-yellow. A black stripe runs along the spine from the head to the base of the tail. Its voice is a high-pitched whistle.

== Distribution and habitat ==
The northern birch mouse occurs in Scandinavia, Central and Eastern Europe, and Northern Asia. Its main range extends from the Baltic region, Poland and the Czech Republic eastwards as far as Lake Baikal in Siberia, and from the Arctic Circle southwards to the Carpathians. Isolated populations occur in Norway, Sweden, Denmark, Germany, and Austria. Its natural habitat is coniferous forests, mixed deciduous woodland, marshy woodland, and damp bushy grassland, and it is sometimes found in cereal crops.

== Biology ==
The northern birch mouse is largely herbivorous and feeds on buds, shoots, grass seeds, and berries, but it also takes earthworms, insects, and snails, often finding these under loose bark. It is a skillful climber and often clambers around in trees and shrubs, gripping the twigs and branches with its five-toed feet and using its prehensile tail for additional support.

In the summer, the northern birch mouse makes a nest of dry vegetation in a bush, clump of moss, or tussock of grass. Breeding takes place between May and August, and a single litter of up to six young is produced after a gestation period of 4–5 weeks. This mouse hibernates in winter, seeking out a natural crack or the burrow of another animal, in a dry location such as on an embankment or in a bushy place. Other sites chosen can be in a hollow tree, in a tree stump or fallen log, or in a gap under a rock. During the hibernation period, which may last from October to May, the tail is wrapped spirally around the animal's body.

== Status ==
The northern birch mouse has a very large range. In Western Europe, it is generally uncommon with isolated subpopulations, but further east it is very common. Its population trend is unknown, but the IUCN lists the species as being of least Concern, as it considers that it is unlikely to be declining at such a rate as to justify including it in a more vulnerable category. No specific threats to this mouse have been identified, but agriculture may affect its numbers in Germany, and deforestation may affect it in Romania.

== See also ==
- Forest dormouse
- Balkan mole-rat
