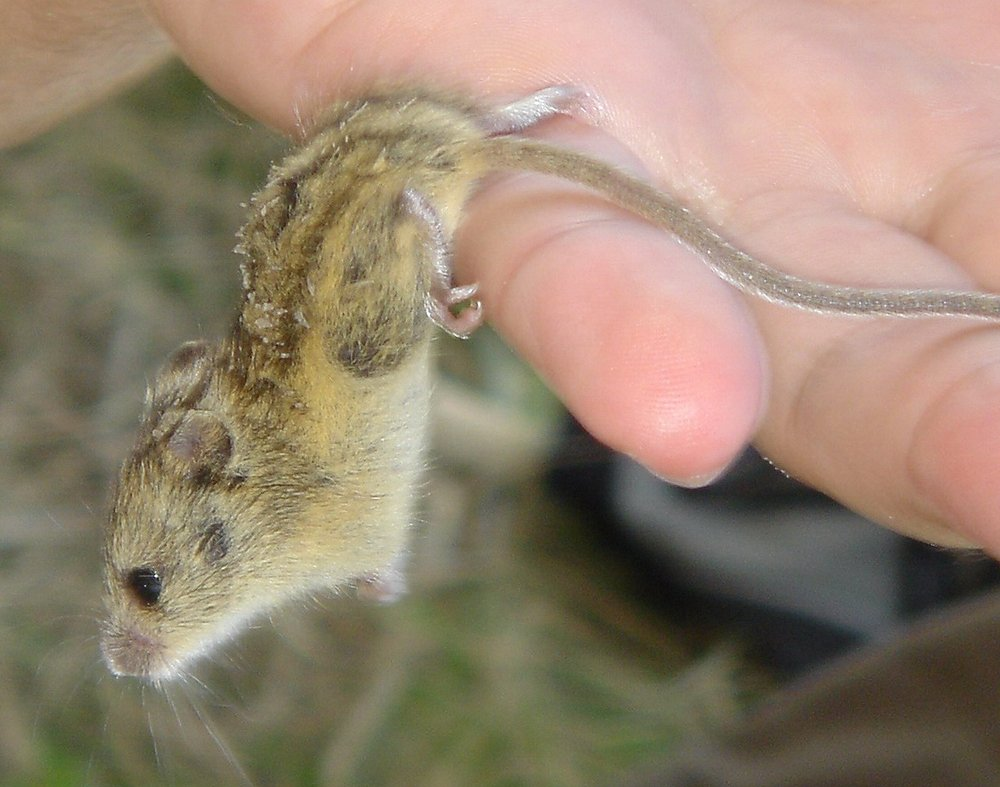

Conservation status
- Least Concern (IUCN 3.1)

Scientific classification
- Kingdom: Animalia
- Phylum: Chordata
- Class: Mammalia
- Order: Rodentia
- Family: Sminthidae
- Genus: Sicista
- Species: S. subtilis

Binomial name
- Sicista subtilis (Pallas, 1773)

= Southern birch mouse =

Species of rodent

The southern birch mouse (Sicista subtilis) is a species of birch mouse in the family Sminthidae. It is native to southern Russia, Kazakhstan, and potentially northern Mongolia and China.

== Taxonomy ==
The Hungarian birch mouse (S. trizona) and Nordmann's birch mouse (S. loriger) were previously thought to be subspecies representing isolated western populations of S. subtilis, but phylogenetic and anatomical evidence supports them being distinct species.

A 2018 study detected a distinct, previously unknown genetic lineage of S. subtilis in the North Caucasus.

== Description ==
The most prominent characteristic of the southern birch mouse is the dark dorsal stripe down the centre of the back, which is bordered by two narrow bright stripes on both sides. From head to rump, it measures 56 to 72 mm (2.2 to 2.8 in), with a tail 110 to 130% of the main body length. The background fur colour is grey-brown.

== Ecology ==
The southern birch mouse is pronouncedly a steppe dweller. It makes a burrow in the summer and hibernates. It eats green plants and insects.
