= List of dipodids =

Species in mammal family Dipodidae

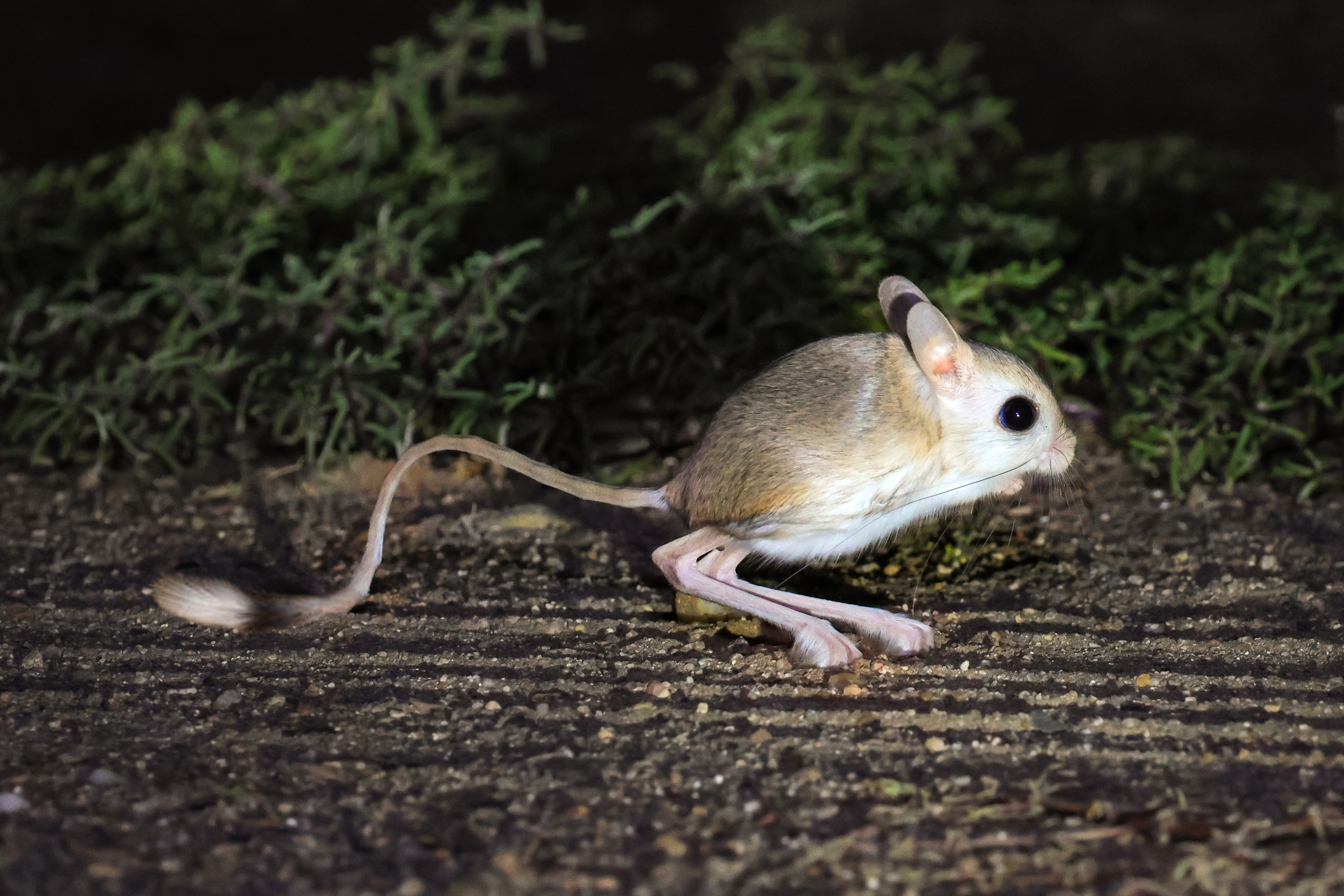
Lesser Egyptian jerboa (Jaculus jaculus)

Dipodidae is a family of mammals in the order Rodentia and part of the Myomorpha suborder. Members of this family are called dipodids or jerboas. They are found in Asia, northern Africa, and eastern Europe, primarily in deserts, shrublands, and grasslands, though some species can be found in coastal areas or forests. They range in size from the Baluchistan pygmy jerboa, at 4 cm (2 in) plus a 7 cm (3 in) tail, to the great jerboa, at 23 cm (9 in) plus a 30 cm (12 in) tail. Dipodids are omnivores, and eat a variety of vegetation as well as insects, arachnids, and lizards. No dipodids have population estimates, but none of the species are categorized as endangered.

The 33 extant species of Dipodidae are divided into 13 genera, divided into 4 subfamilies. Allactaginae contains 16 species in 4 genera, Cardiocraniinae contains 7 species in 3 genera, Dipodinae contains 9 species in 5 genera, and Euchoreutinae contains a single species. Several extinct prehistoric dipodid species have been discovered, though due to ongoing research and discoveries, the exact number and categorization is not fixed.

== Conventions ==
IUCN Red List categories
Conservation status
- EX: Extinct (0 species)
- EW: Extinct in the wild (0 species)
- CR: Critically endangered (0 species)
- EN: Endangered (0 species)
- VU: Vulnerable (0 species)
- NT: Near threatened (0 species)
- LC: Least concern (26 species)

Other categories
- DD: Data deficient (6 species)
- NE: Not evaluated (1 species)

The author citation for the species or genus is given after the scientific name; parentheses around the author citation indicate that this was not the original taxonomic placement. Conservation status codes listed follow the International Union for Conservation of Nature (IUCN) Red List of Threatened Species. Range maps are provided wherever possible; if a range map is not available, a description of the dipodid's range is provided. Ranges are based on the IUCN Red List for that species unless otherwise noted.

== Classification ==
Dipodidae is a family consisting of 33 extant species in 13 genera. These genera are divided into four subfamilies: Allactaginae, containing 16 species in 4 genera; Cardiocraniinae, containing 7 species in 3 genera; Dipodinae, containing 9 species in 5 genera; and Euchoreutinae, containing a single species. This does not include hybrid species or extinct prehistoric species.

Family Dipodidae

- Subfamily Allactaginae
  - Genus Allactaga (five-toed jerboas): eight species
  - Genus Allactodipus (Bobrinski's jerboa): one species
  - Genus Pygeretmus (fat-tailed jerboas): three species
  - Genus Scarturus (four- and five-toed jerboas): four species
- Subfamily Cardiocraniinae
  - Genus Cardiocranius (five-toed pygmy jerboa): one species
  - Genus Salpingotulus (Baluchistan pygmy jerboa): one species
  - Genus Salpingotus (three-toed dwarf jerboas): five species
- Subfamily Dipodinae
  - Genus Dipus (northern three-toed jerboa): one species
  - Genus Eremodipus (Lichtenstein's jerboa): one species
  - Genus Jaculus (desert jerboas): three species
  - Genus Paradipus (comb-toed jerboa): one species
  - Genus Stylodipus (thick-tailed three-toed jerboas): three species
- Subfamily Euchoreutinae
  - Genus Euchoreutes (long-eared jerboa): one species

- Dipodidae
  - - Cardiocraniinae
      - Cardiocranius
      - - Salpingotulus
        - Salpingotus
  - - - Euchoreutinae
        Euchoreutes
    - - Allactaginae
        - - Allactaga
          - Allactodipus
        - - Pygeretmus
          - Scarturus
      - Dipodinae
        - Paradipus
        - - Dipus
          - - Stylodipus
            - - Eremodipus
              - Jaculus

== Dipodids ==
The following classification is based on the taxonomy described by the reference work Mammal Species of the World (2005), with augmentation by generally accepted proposals made since using molecular phylogenetic analysis, as supported by both the IUCN and the American Society of Mammalogists.

=== Subfamily Allactaginae ===
Genus Allactaga – F. Cuvier, 1836 – eight species
| Common name | Scientific name and subspecies | Range | Size and ecology | IUCN status and estimated population |
|---|---|---|---|---|
| Balikun jerboa | A. balikunica Hsia & Fang, 1964 | Southern Mongolia and northern China (in green) | Size: 12–14 cm (5–6 in) long, plus 17–20 cm (7–8 in) tail Habitat: Shrubland and desert Diet: Roots, tubers, insects, and larvae | LC Unknown |
| Four-toed jerboa | A. tetradactyla (Lichtenstein, 1823) | Northern Libya and northern Egypt (in purple) | Size: 10–12 cm (4–5 in) long, plus 15–18 cm (6–7 in) tail Habitat: Coastal marine Diet: Vegetation | DD Unknown |
| Gobi jerboa | A. bullata Allen, 1925 | Southern Mongolia and northern China (in blue) | Size: 12–15 cm (5–6 in) long, plus 15–20 cm (6–8 in) tail Habitat: Grassland and desert Diet: Seeds, roots, tubers, insects, and larvae | LC Unknown |
| Great jerboa | A. major (Kerr, 1792) | Central and western Asia and eastern Europe (in brown) | Size: 18–23 cm (7–9 in) long, plus 20–30 cm (8–12 in) tail Habitat: Shrubland, grassland, and desert Diet: Plants and seeds, as well as insects and molluscs | LC Unknown |
| Hotson's jerboa | A. hotsoni Thomas, 1920 | South-central Asia (in orange) | Size: 9–17 cm (4–7 in) long, plus 16–22 cm (6–9 in) tail Habitat: Forest, shrubland, grassland, and desert Diet: Vegetation | LC Unknown |
| Iranian jerboa | A. firouzi Womochel, 1978 | Iran (in pink, in box) | Size: 9–17 cm (4–7 in) long, plus 16–22 cm (6–9 in) tail Habitat: Shrubland and desert Diet: Vegetation | DD Unknown |
| Mongolian five-toed jerboa | A. sibirica (Forster, 1778) | Central Asia (in red) | Size: 12–18 cm (5–7 in) long, plus 17–24 cm (7–9 in) tail Habitat: Shrubland and grassland Diet: Insects | LC Unknown |
| Severtzov's jerboa | A. severtzovi Vinogradov, 1925 | Central Asia (in yellow) | Size: 14–19 cm (6–7 in) long, plus 20–25 cm (8–10 in) tail Habitat: Desert Diet: Vegetation | LC Unknown |

Genus Allactodipus – Kolesnikov, 1937 – one species
| Common name | Scientific name and subspecies | Range | Size and ecology | IUCN status and estimated population |
|---|---|---|---|---|
| Bobrinski's jerboa | A. bobrinskii Kolesnikov, 1937 | Central Asia | Size: 11–14 cm (4–6 in) long, plus 17–20 cm (7–8 in) tail Habitat: Desert Diet: Vegetation and insects | LC Unknown |

Genus Pygeretmus – Gloger, 1841 – three species
| Common name | Scientific name and subspecies | Range | Size and ecology | IUCN status and estimated population |
|---|---|---|---|---|
| Dwarf fat-tailed jerboa | P. pumilio (Kerr, 1792) | Central Asia (in red) | Size: 9–14 cm (4–6 in) long, plus 12–18 cm (5–7 in) tail Habitat: Shrubland Diet: Succulent plants, bulbs, roots, and rhizomes | LC Unknown |
| Greater fat-tailed jerboa | P. shitkovi (Kuznetsov, 1930) | Kazakhstan (in green) | Size: 8–13 cm (3–5 in) long, plus 9–15 cm (4–6 in) tail Habitat: Desert Diet: Vegetation, bulbs, spiders, and insects | LC Unknown |
| Lesser fat-tailed jerboa | P. platyurus (Lichtenstein, 1823) | Central Asia (in blue) | Size: 7–12 cm (3–5 in) long, plus 7–10 cm (3–4 in) tail Habitat: Desert Diet: Vegetation, bulbs, spiders, and insects | LC Unknown |

Genus Scarturus – Gloger, 1841 – four species
| Common name | Scientific name and subspecies | Range | Size and ecology | IUCN status and estimated population |
|---|---|---|---|---|
| Euphrates jerboa | S. euphratica (Thomas, 1881) | Southwestern Asia | Size: 7–14 cm (3–6 in) long, plus 14–21 cm (6–8 in) tail Habitat: Shrubland and grassland Diet: Vegetation | LC Unknown |
| Small five-toed jerboa | S. elater Lichtenstein, 1825 | Central Asia | Size: 9–12 cm (4–5 in) long, plus 14–19 cm (6–7 in) tail Habitat: Shrubland and desert Diet: Vegetation and insects | LC Unknown |
| Vinogradov's jerboa | S. vinogradovi Argiropulo, 1941 | Central Asia | Size: 10–13 cm (4–5 in) long, plus 17–20 cm (7–8 in) tail Habitat: Desert Diet: Sprouts, seeds, and underground plant parts | LC Unknown |
| Williams's jerboa | S. williamsi (Thomas, 1897) | Western Asia | Size: 10–15 cm (4–6 in) long, plus 16–26 cm (6–10 in) tail Habitat: Grassland Diet: Vegetation | LC Unknown |

=== Subfamily Cardiocraniinae ===
Genus Cardiocranius – Satunin, 1903 – one species
| Common name | Scientific name and subspecies | Range | Size and ecology | IUCN status and estimated population |
|---|---|---|---|---|
| Five-toed pygmy jerboa | C. paradoxus Satunin, 1903 | East-central Asia | Size: 5–7 cm (2–3 in) long, plus 6–10 cm (2–4 in) tail Habitat: Desert Diet: Seeds | DD Unknown |

Genus Salpingotulus – Pavlinov, 1980 – one species
| Common name | Scientific name and subspecies | Range | Size and ecology | IUCN status and estimated population |
|---|---|---|---|---|
| Baluchistan pygmy jerboa | S. michaelis (FitzGibbon, 1966) | Pakistan | Size: 4–5 cm (2 in) long, plus 7–10 cm (3–4 in) tail Habitat: Desert Diet: Grass seeds, stems, and other vegetation | DD Unknown |

Genus Salpingotus – Vinogradov, 1922 – five species
| Common name | Scientific name and subspecies | Range | Size and ecology | IUCN status and estimated population |
|---|---|---|---|---|
| Heptner's pygmy jerboa | S. heptneri Vorontsov & Smirnov, 1969 | Kazakhstan and Uzbekistan (in green) | Size: 4–6 cm (2 in) long, plus 8–11 cm (3–4 in) tail Habitat: Desert Diet: Insects, arachnids, and vegetation | DD Unknown |
| Kozlov's pygmy jerboa | S. kozlovi Vinogradov, 1922 | China and Mongolia (in blue) | Size: 5–7 cm (2–3 in) long, plus 11–14 cm (4–6 in) tail Habitat: Shrubland, grassland, and desert Diet: Insects, arachnids, and vegetation | LC Unknown |
| Pale pygmy jerboa | S. pallidus Vorontsov & Shenbrot, 1984 | Kazakhstan (in brown) | Size: 5–7 cm (2–3 in) long, plus 9–12 cm (4–5 in) tail Habitat: Desert Diet: Insects, arachnids, and vegetation | DD Unknown |
| Thick-tailed pygmy jerboa | S. crassicauda Vinogradov, 1924 | East-central Asia (in red) | Size: 4–7 cm (2–3 in) long, plus 9–12 cm (4–5 in) tail Habitat: Shrubland, grassland, and desert Diet: Insects, arachnids, and vegetation | LC Unknown |
| Thomas's pygmy jerboa | S. thomasi Vinogradov, 1928 | Afghanistan | Size: About 6 cm (2 in) long, plus about 11 cm (4 in) tail Habitat: Desert Diet: Insects, arachnids, and vegetation | NE Unknown |

=== Subfamily Dipodinae ===
Genus Dipus – Zimmermann, 1780 – one species
| Common name | Scientific name and subspecies | Range | Size and ecology | IUCN status and estimated population |
|---|---|---|---|---|
| Northern three-toed jerboa | D. sagitta (Pallas, 1773) | Western, central, and eastern Asia | Size: 10–15 cm (4–6 in) long, plus 12–20 cm (5–8 in) tail Habitat: Shrubland and desert Diet: All parts of plants, as well as insects | LC Unknown |

Genus Eremodipus – Vinogradov, 1930 – one species
| Common name | Scientific name and subspecies | Range | Size and ecology | IUCN status and estimated population |
|---|---|---|---|---|
| Lichtenstein's jerboa | E. lichtensteini (Vinogradov, 1927) | Central Asia | Size: 10–12 cm (4–5 in) long, plus 13–17 cm (5–7 in) tail Habitat: Desert Diet: Roots, sprouts, seeds, grains, and vegetables | LC Unknown |

Genus Jaculus – Erxleben, 1777 – three species
| Common name | Scientific name and subspecies | Range | Size and ecology | IUCN status and estimated population |
|---|---|---|---|---|
| Blanford's jerboa | J. blanfordi (Murray, 1884) | Central Asia | Size: 13–15 cm (5–6 in) long, plus 18–22 cm (7–9 in) tail Habitat: Desert Diet: Roots, sprouts, seeds, grains, and vegetables | LC Unknown |
| Greater Egyptian jerboa | J. orientalis Erxleben, 1777 | Northern Africa and western Middle East | Size: 9–15 cm (4–6 in) long, plus 17–21 cm (7–8 in) tail Habitat: Shrubland and coastal marine Diet: Roots, sprouts, seeds, grains, and vegetables | LC Unknown |
| Lesser Egyptian jerboa | J. jaculus (Linnaeus, 1758) | Northern Africa and Middle East | Size: 11–13 cm (4–5 in) long, plus 19–20 cm (7–8 in) tail Habitat: Shrubland, grassland, rocky areas, and desert Diet: Roots, sprouts, seeds, grains, and vegetables | LC Unknown |

Genus Paradipus – Vinogradov, 1930 – one species
| Common name | Scientific name and subspecies | Range | Size and ecology | IUCN status and estimated population |
|---|---|---|---|---|
| Comb-toed jerboa | P. ctenodactylus (Vinogradov, 1929) | Central Asia | Size: 14–17 cm (6–7 in) long, plus 18–22 cm (7–9 in) tail Habitat: Desert Diet: All parts of desert plants | LC Unknown |

Genus Stylodipus – Allen, 1925 – three species
| Common name | Scientific name and subspecies | Range | Size and ecology | IUCN status and estimated population |
|---|---|---|---|---|
| Andrews's three-toed jerboa | S. andrewsi Allen, 1925 | Mongolia and northern China | Size: 12–14 cm (5–6 in) long, plus 14–17 cm (6–7 in) tail Habitat: Forest, shrubland, and desert Diet: Lichen, rhizomes, bulbs, seeds, and wheat | LC Unknown |
| Mongolian three-toed jerboa | S. sungorus Sokolov & Shenbrot, 1987 | Mongolia | Size: 12–13 cm (5 in) long, plus 15–17 cm (6–7 in) tail Habitat: Shrubland and grassland Diet: Lichen, rhizomes, bulbs, seeds, and wheat | LC Unknown |
| Thick-tailed three-toed jerboa | S. telum (Lichtenstein, 1823) | Ukraine and western and central Asia | Size: 11–13 cm (4–5 in) long, plus 13–17 cm (5–7 in) tail Habitat: Desert Diet: Lichen, rhizomes, bulbs, seeds, and wheat | LC Unknown |

=== Subfamily Euchoreutinae ===
Genus Euchoreutes – W. L. Sclater, 1891 – one species
| Common name | Scientific name and subspecies | Range | Size and ecology | IUCN status and estimated population |
|---|---|---|---|---|
| Long-eared jerboa | E. naso P. L. Sclater, 1891 | Southern Mongolia and China | Size: 9–11 cm (4 in) long, plus 14–18 cm (6–7 in) tail Habitat: Shrubland and desert Diet: Insects and lizards | LC Unknown |

== Sources ==
- Chernasky, Amy; Motis, Anna; Burgin, Connor, eds. (2023). All the Mammals of the World. Lynx Nature Books. ISBN 978-84-16728-66-4.
- Nowak, Ronald M. (1999). Walker's Mammals of the World. Vol. 2 (6th ed.). Johns Hopkins University Press. ISBN 978-0-8018-5789-8.
- Holder, Mary Ellen; Musser, Guy G. (2005). Wilson, Don E.; Reeder, DeeAnn M. (eds.). Mammal Species of the World. Vol. 2 (3rd ed.). Johns Hopkins University Press. ISBN 978-0-8018-8221-0.
