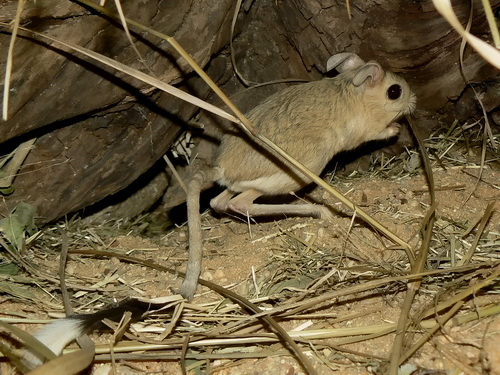
- Allactaga elater

Scientific classification
- Kingdom: Animalia
- Phylum: Chordata
- Class: Mammalia
- Infraclass: Placentalia
- Order: Rodentia
- Family: Dipodidae
- Subfamily: Allactaginae; Vinogradov, 1925

Genera
- Allactaga; Allactodipus; Pygeretmus; Scarturus

= Allactaginae =

Allactaginae Temporal range: Middle Miocene - Recent

Subfamily of rodents

Allactaginae is a subfamily of rodents. Most species live in Central Asia, with some in West Asia and one in North Africa.

== Classification ==
Subfamily Allactaginae

- Genus Allactaga
  - Subgenus Allactaga
    - Iranian jerboa, Allactaga firouzi — West Asia
    - Hotson's jerboa, Allactaga hotsoni — West Asia
    - Great jerboa, Allactaga major — Central Asia
    - Severtzov's jerboa, Allactaga severtzovi — Central Asia
  - Subgenus Orientallactaga — Central Asia
    - Balikun jerboa, Allactaga balikunica
    - Gobi jerboa, Allactaga bullata
    - Mongolian five-toed jerboa, Allactaga sibirica
- Genus Allactodipus — Central Asia
  - Bobrinski's jerboa, Allactodipus bobrinskii
- Genus Pygeretmus, fat-tailed jerboas — Central Asia
  - Lesser fat-tailed jerboa, Pygeretmus platyurus
  - Dwarf fat-tailed jerboa, Pygeretmus pumilio
  - Greater fat-tailed jerboa, Pygeretmus shitkovi
- Genus Scarturus
  - Small five-toed jerboa, Scarturus elater — West and Central Asia
  - Euphrates jerboa, Scarturus euphratica — West Asia
  - Four-toed jerboa, Scarturus tetradactyla — North Africa
  - Vinogradov's jerboa, Scarturus vinogradovi — Central Asia
  - Williams' jerboa, Scarturus williamsi — West Asia

The cladogram below is based on a 2022 phylogenetic study of the nuclear genes by Lebedev et al.

- - - Orientallactaga
      - - Allactaga bullata (Gobi jerboa)
        - Allactaga balikunica (Balikun jerboa)
      - Allactaga sibirica (Mongolian five-toed jerboa)
    - Allactaga
      - - Allactaga major (Great jerboa)
        - Allactaga severtzovi (Severtzov's jerboa)
      - Allactodipus bobrinskii (Bobrinski's jerboa)
  - - - Pygeretmus pumilio (Dwarf fat-tailed jerboa)
      - - Pygeretmus platyurus (Lesser fat-tailed jerboa)
        - Pygeretmus shitkovi (Greater fat-tailed jerboa)
    - - - - Scarturus elater (Small five-toed jerboa)
          - Scarturus vinogradovi (Vinogradov's jerboa)
        - - Scarturus williamsi (Williams's jerboa)
          - Scarturus euphratica (Euphrates jerboa)
      - - Allactaga hotsoni (Hotson's jerboa)
        - Scarturus tetradactyla (Four-toed jerboa)
