= Paradipodinae =

Scientific classification
- Domain: Eukaryota
- Kingdom: Animalia
- Phylum: Chordata
- Class: Mammalia
- Order: Rodentia
- Family: Dipodidae
- Subfamily: Paradipodinae; Pavlinov & Shenbrot, 1983

Genus
- Paradipus Vinogradov, 1930

Subfamily of rodents

Paradipodinae is a monotypic subfamily of Dipodidae, consisting solely of the comb-toed jerboa (Paradipus ctenodactylus).

Native to Turkmenistan, Kazakhstan and Uzbekistan. Specifically, desert regions with bushy vegetation – acacia, calligonum, three-awn – where the subfamily is more prevalent than other rodents.

Paradipodinae is relatively less documented compared to other subfamilies of Dipodidae. It is known to be nocturnal, will dig temporary burrows, and shares a number of behavioral traits with other jerboa species. The single species, the comb-toed jerboa (Paradipus ctenodactylus), has been described as “extremely hard to observe”. The majority of inferences made about the species have been made by analyzing the tracks and examining the burrows. The species is nocturnal and known as the fastest of the jerboas, often reaching speeds of 10.8 km/h (180 meters/minute) during a sprint.

There is little evidence that Paradipodinae dig permanent burrows. From observations, comb-toed jerboas only dig temporary burrows that do not branch, and the entrances are not sealed during the day, a behavior present in other jerboa species.

Like the rest of the Dipodidae family, Paradipodinae is completely herbivorous, the diet consisting of fruits, shoots and other parts of a very selective range of desert plant species. The jerboas gather food by leaping into the shrubs from the ground or by climbing using their forelimbs and teeth.

Foxes, owls, cats and mustelids are the main predators of Paradipodinae. There are also a number of flea species that utilize the jerboas as hosts.
