= Iranian jerboa =

Conservation status
- Data Deficient (IUCN 3.1)

Scientific classification
- Kingdom: Animalia
- Phylum: Chordata
- Class: Mammalia
- Infraclass: Placentalia
- Order: Rodentia
- Family: Dipodidae
- Genus: Allactaga
- Subgenus: Allactaga
- Species: A. firouzi

Binomial name
- Allactaga firouzi Womochel, 1978
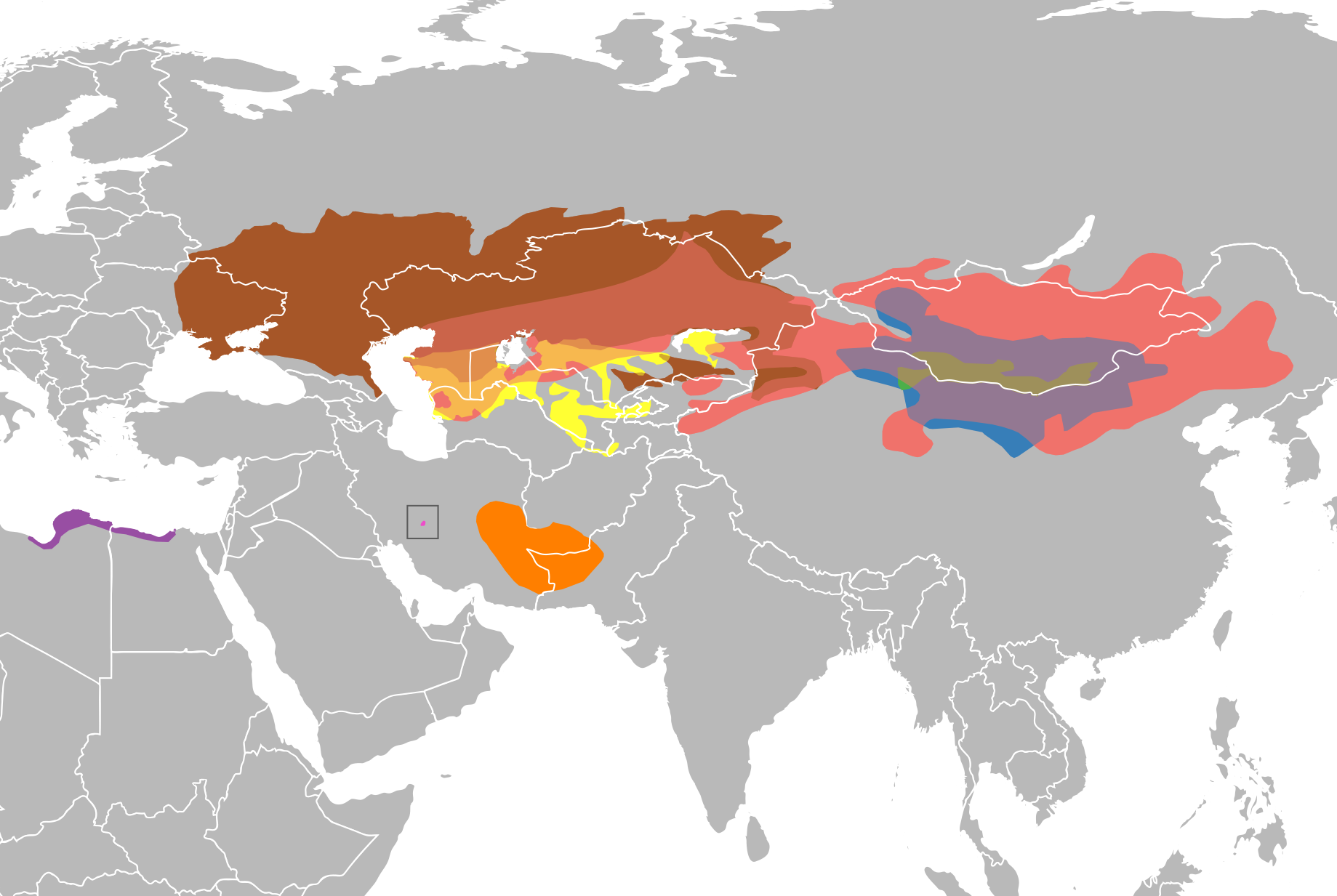
- A. firouzi in pink (in box)

Species of rodent

The Iranian jerboa (Allactaga firouzi) is a rodent of the family Dipodidae and subfamily Allactaginae. They are characteristically known as hopping rodents and have only been found in a small population in Iran. Iranian jerboa are microhabitat specialist, they require a particular environment to provide them with specific conditions suitable for living.

== Physical appearance ==
Similar to the other jerboas in the genus Allactaga, the Iranian jerboa are small hopping rodents of desert regions and have large ears and a long tail. The tail assists and serves as support when the jerboa is standing upright. They have long hind feet and short forelegs. The forelimbs of the jerboa serve as a pair of hands for feeding, grooming, etc.

== Predation ==
Iranian jerboas were found on flat plains with a gravel and little vegetation. Low vegetation areas help them see predators more easily, allowing them to return to burrows quickly. Similar to most jerboas, the Iranian Jerboa avoids brightly moonlit nights to decrease the chance of predation.

== Phylogeny ==
Compared to other jerboas in the same genus, Iranian jerboas are most related to Allactaga hotsoni.

== Burrows/tunnels ==
It is a nocturnal animal, spending the day in burrows. The Iranian Jerboas are one of the few jerboas that have different types of burrows. They make a different burrow in the summer and winter. The winter burrows have deeper tunnels, for protection during hibernation from predators and harsh winters.

== Diet ==
This jerboa has a vegetarian diet of Anabasis and Peganum harmala.
