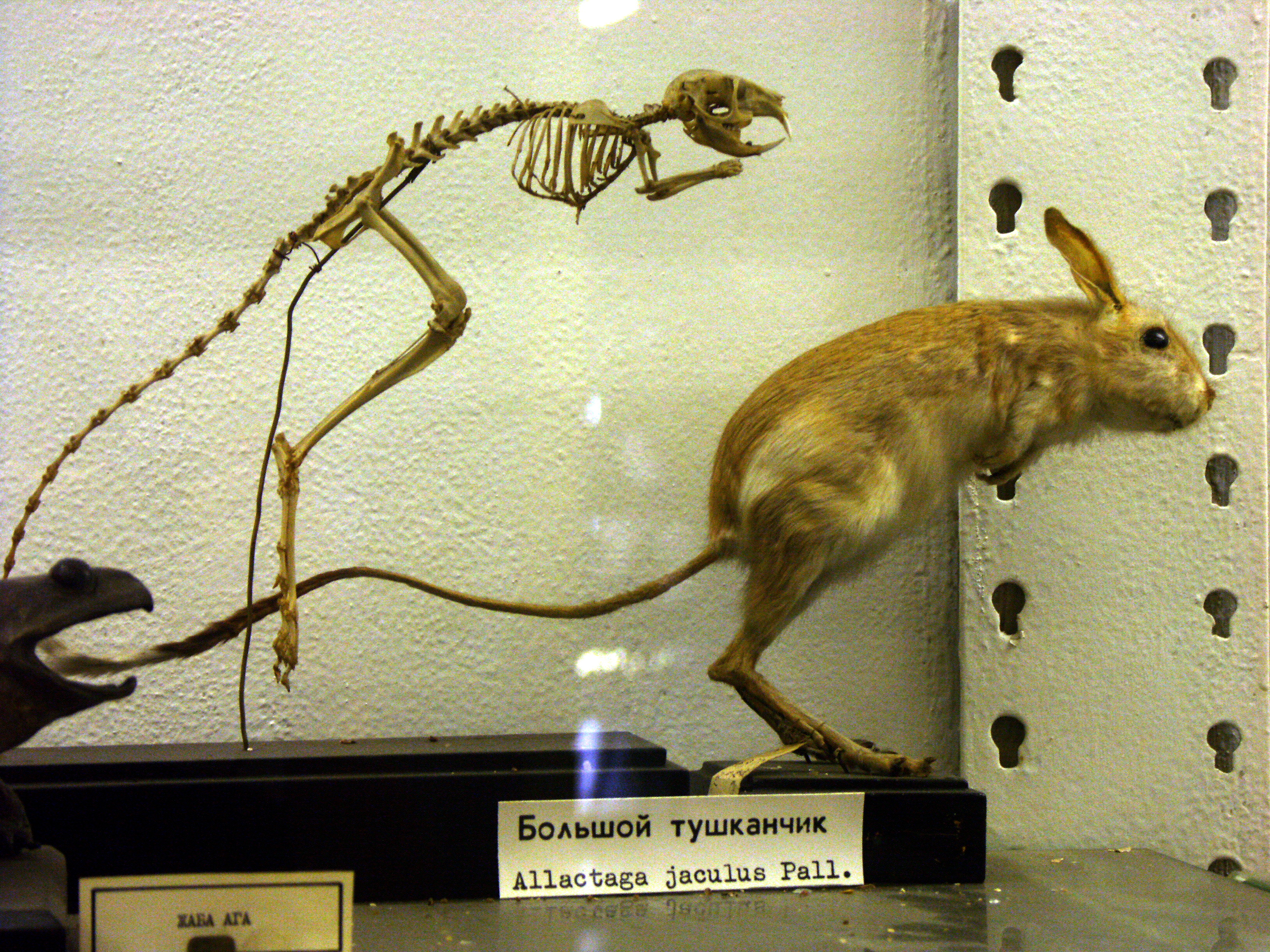

Scientific classification
- Kingdom: Animalia
- Phylum: Chordata
- Class: Mammalia
- Infraclass: Placentalia
- Order: Rodentia
- Family: Dipodidae
- Subfamily: Allactaginae
- Genus: Allactaga; F. Cuvier, 1836

Type species
- Mus jaculus Pallas, 1778 (= Dipus sibericus major Kerr, 1792)

Species
- Allactaga balikunica Allactaga bullata Allactaga firouzi Allactaga hotsoni Allactaga major Allactaga severtzovi Allactaga sibirica Allactaga toussi
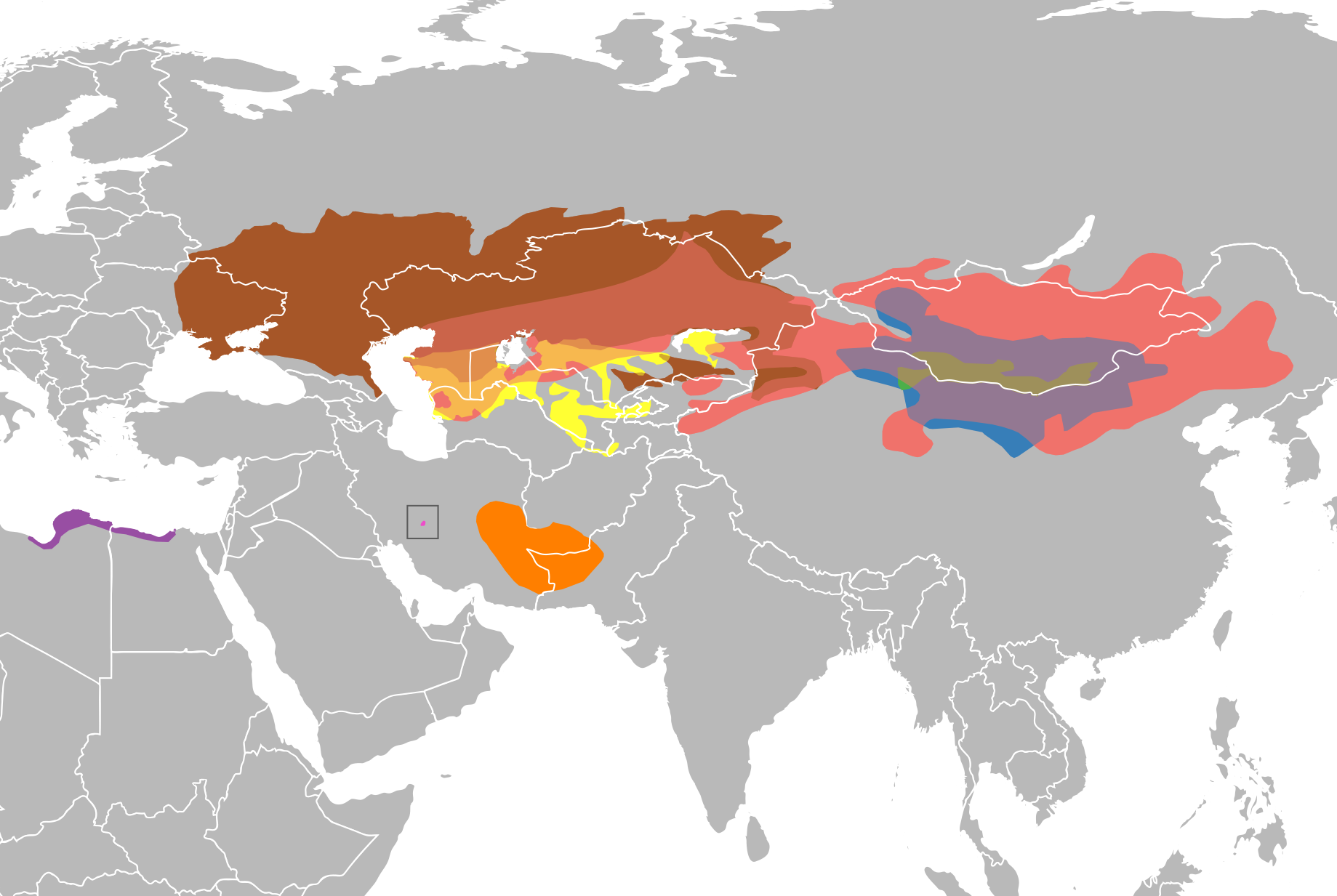
- Allactaga distribution A. major in brown, A. severtzovi in yellow, A. sibirica in red, A. bullata in blue, A. balikunica in green, A. tetradactyla in purple, A. hotsoni in orange, A. firouzi in pink (in box)

= Allactaga =

Allactaga Temporal range: Late Miocene - Recent

Genus of mammals

The genus Allactaga contains the five-toed jerboas of Asia. They are small mammals belonging to the order of rodents. They are characteristically known as the hopping rodents of the desert and semi-arid regions. They have long hind feet, short forelimbs, and walk upright. They have large ears in comparison to their body size and a large tail. The tail assists and serves as support when the jerboa is standing upright. The jerboa body length ranges from 5–15 cm and has a tail ranging from 7–25 cm. The "forelimbs of the jerboa serve as a pair of hands for feeding, grooming, etc." Jerboas use their nose to burrow and push the dirt when looking for food. The male jerboa is usually larger in size and weight in comparison to the female jerboa. The pelt of the jerboa is either silky or velvety in texture and light in color, the coloration helps camouflage into surroundings to avoid predators. All members of the genus have five toes.

== Adaptation to desert conditions ==
Jerboas are adapted to live in deserts therefore are called xerocole animals. They are nocturnal and spend most of their day burrowed under sand to avoid the heat. Burrowing under the sand, they evade the heat from the sun, minimizing water loss and avoiding dehydration. By decreasing activity during the day they require less water intake. The jerboas build large burrow systems, tunnels, to stay in during the day. These burrows have a higher moisture concentration than at the surface level and help reduce body water loss. Specific species of jerboas plug burrow entrances with soil to retain moisture and keep hot air from entering burrows. The pelt of the jerboa is usually light and sandy in color to reflect heat from the sun and reduce heat absorption.

== Social habits ==
Jerboas are highly social animals and require interactions with other jerboas. After nightfall, they congregate in large burrows and demonstrate intense activity. At the entrance of the burrow, each male jerboa leaves droppings to identify they are in the burrow.

== Diet ==
The hot temperature of the desert restricts the jerboas to search for food at nightfall, when the temperature is cooler. Diet varies by species, some feeding almost exclusively on vegetation and others are insectivores. They search for sprouting vegetation, roots, and/or dry grains. During autumn, jerboas are at their heaviest in preparation for hibernation. Jerboas are not considered agricultural pest.

== Reproduction ==
The jerboa reproductive activity depends on the seasons. Similar to other hibernating animals, the mating season for jerboas is spring to summer.

== In captivity ==
Captured jerboas have lived up to two years outside of their natural habitat. In captivity, their life span is significantly reduced. Jerboas rely on social interactions with other jerboas. Additionally, their nature is to burrow in the sand, in captivity or as pets they died from stress if no sand is available.

== Species ==
Genus Allactaga

- incertae sedis
  - Allactaga toussi
- Subgenus Allactaga
  - Iranian jerboa, Allactaga firouzi
  - Hotson's jerboa, Allactaga hotsoni
  - Great jerboa, Allactaga major
  - Severtzov's jerboa, Allactaga severtzovi
- Subgenus Orientallactaga
  - Balikun jerboa, Allactaga balikunica
  - Gobi jerboa, Allactaga bullata
  - Mongolian five-toed jerboa, Allactaga sibirica
