= Great jerboa =

Conservation status
- Least Concern (IUCN 3.1)

Scientific classification
- Kingdom: Animalia
- Phylum: Chordata
- Class: Mammalia
- Order: Rodentia
- Family: Dipodidae
- Genus: Allactaga
- Subgenus: Allactaga
- Species: A. major

Binomial name
- Allactaga major (Kerr, 1792)
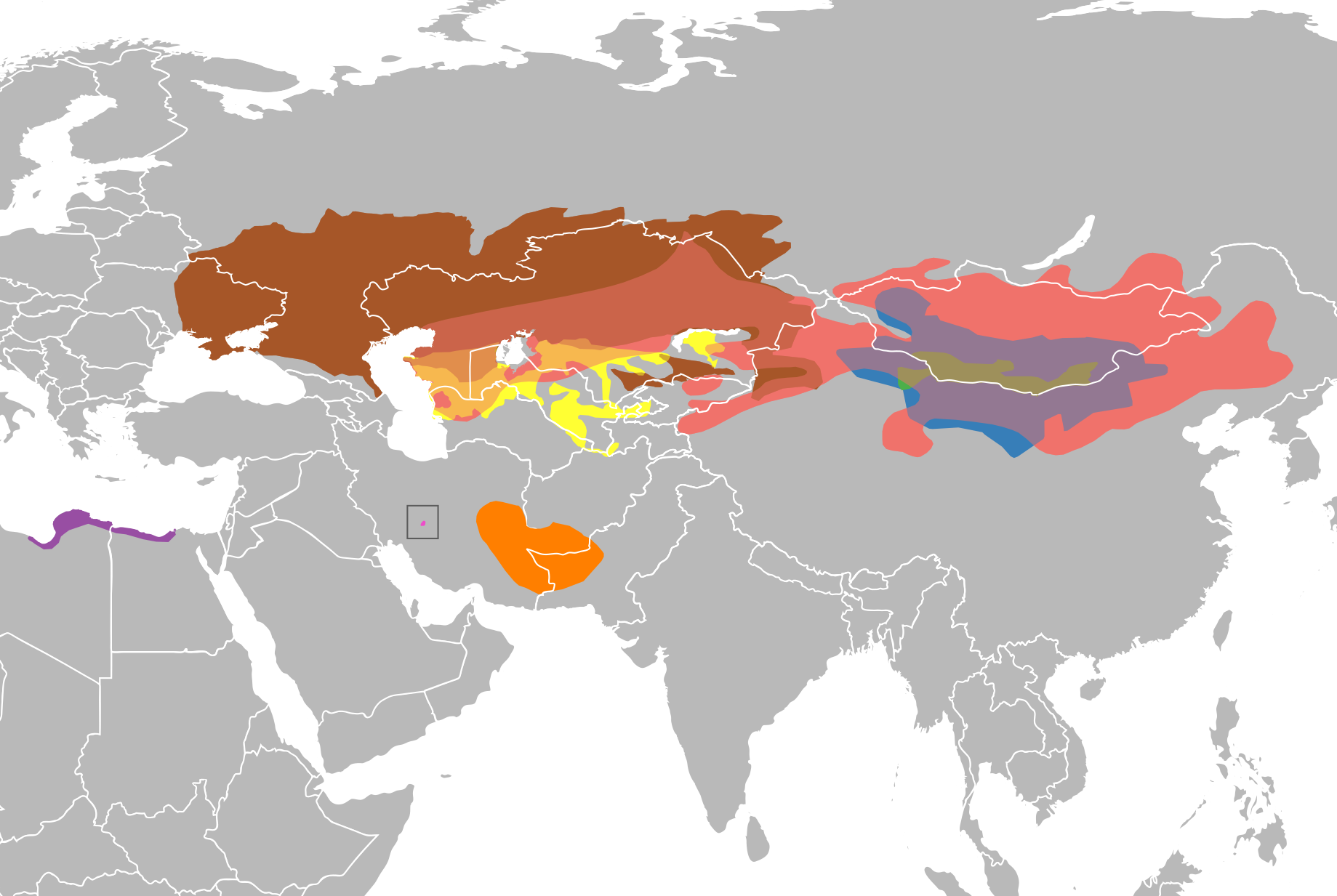
- Allactaga distribution A. major in brown

Synonyms
- Allactaga jaculus (Pallas, 1779)

Species of mammal

The great jerboa (Allactaga major) is a species of rodent in the family Dipodidae. It is found in Kazakhstan, Russia, Turkmenistan, Ukraine and Uzbekistan. It mainly lives in deserts.

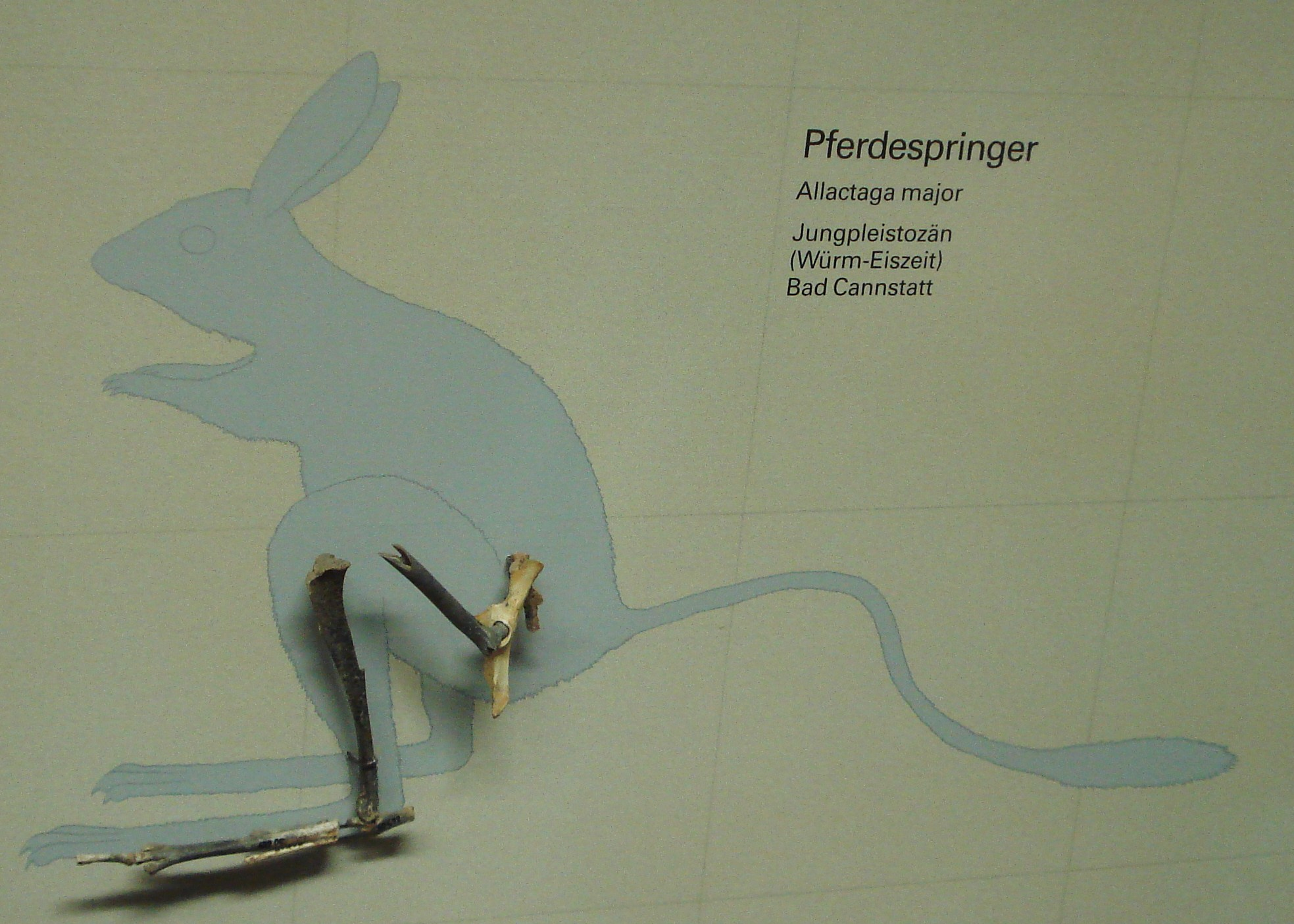
Fossil specimen

== Description ==
The great jerboa is the biggest of all species of jerboa. The length of its body is 180 mm (7.1 in) and its tail is 260 mm (10 in).

== Distribution and habitat ==
In Kazakhstan

The great jerboa is native to the steppes and northern deserts of western Ukraine and European Russia, through Kazakhstan and northern Uzbekistan to eastern Siberia and western Xinjiang, China. Its typical habitat is sparse grassland, sloping areas in ravines, road verges and field edges. It is also present in a range of arid and semi-arid habitats, particularly those with some succulent plant growth. The great jerboa prefers ground that is made up of clay.

== Behavior ==
The great jerboa has three types of burrows, permanent ones for summer and winter and temporary retreats. It likes to eat the bulbs of plants. The plant bulbs it most commonly eats are the bulbs of Gagea. To get to the bulbs the great jerboa uses its teeth. This allows it to dig out the bulb. Other foods this animal will eat, but less commonly, are grains and bark. It hibernates from the first frosts until the spring and it is common for several great jerboas to hibernate together in one nest. Breeding takes place in late spring and summer during which time there may be two litters, each of about three to six young.

== Status ==
The great jerboa has a very wide range and over much of that range is common in suitable habitat. However it is threatened in Ukraine and European Russia by intensification of agriculture and other alterations to its habitat. It has become extinct in the Moscow district where dachas have been built and other man-made alterations have occurred to the landscape. The International Union for Conservation of Nature have listed it as being of "least concern" but thinks populations should continue to be monitored.
