= Dwarf fat-tailed jerboa =

Conservation status
- Least Concern (IUCN 3.1)

Scientific classification
- Kingdom: Animalia
- Phylum: Chordata
- Class: Mammalia
- Infraclass: Placentalia
- Order: Rodentia
- Family: Dipodidae
- Genus: Pygeretmus
- Species: P. pumilio

Binomial name
- Pygeretmus pumilio (Kerr, 1792)
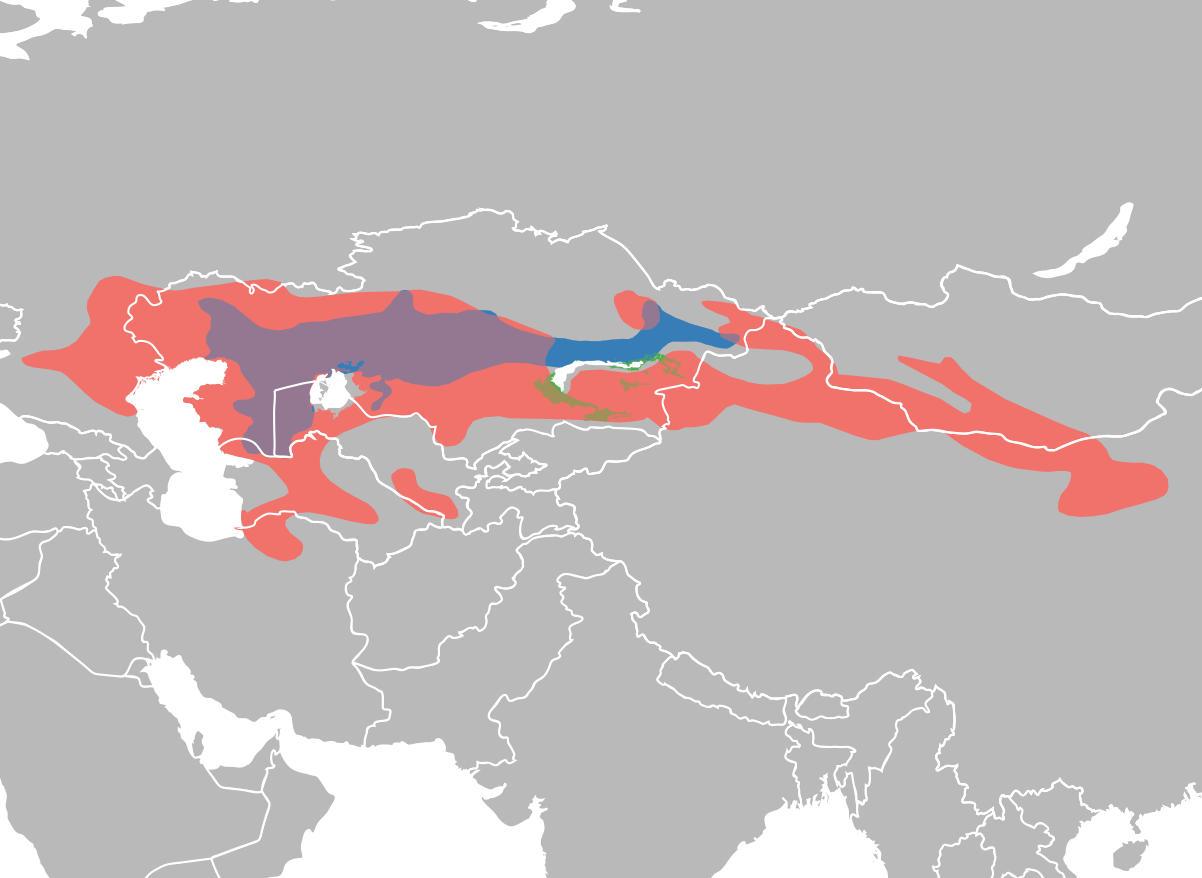
- Pygeretmus distribution P. pumilio in red

Species of rodent

The dwarf fat-tailed jerboa (Pygeretmus pumilio) is a species of rodent in the family Dipodidae. It is found in China, Iran, Kazakhstan, Mongolia, and Russia. They mostly reside in desert environments which can explain their size. They go long periods of time without food and water, which means they need a lower metabolic rate, and can be a reason for their size.
