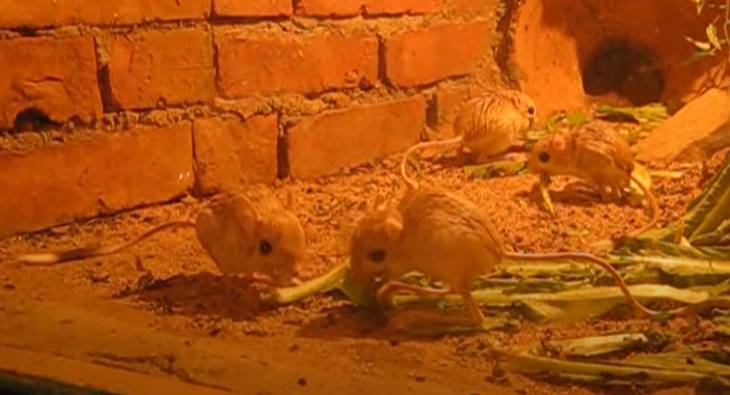

Conservation status
- Data Deficient (IUCN 3.1)

Scientific classification
- Kingdom: Animalia
- Phylum: Chordata
- Class: Mammalia
- Order: Rodentia
- Family: Dipodidae
- Subfamily: Cardiocraniinae
- Genus: Salpingotulus; Pavlinov, 1980
- Species: S. michaelis

Binomial name
- Salpingotulus michaelis (FitzGibbon, 1966)
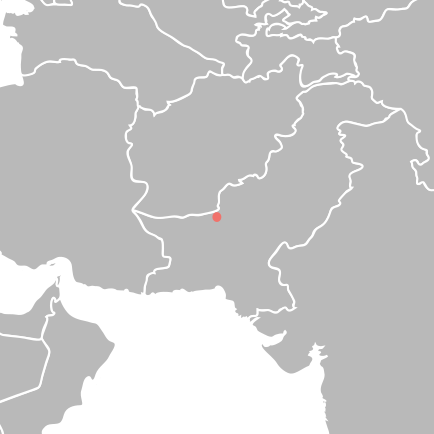
- Salpingotulus michaelis distribution

= Baluchistan pygmy jerboa =

Species of rodent

The Baluchistan pygmy jerboa (Salpingotulus michaelis) or dwarf three-toed jerboa, is a species of rodent in the family Dipodidae. It is the only species in the genus Salpingotulus.

== Description ==
Adults average only 4.3 cm (1.7 in) in head and body length, with the tail averaging 8 cm (3.1 in). Adult females weigh 3.2 g (0.11 oz). It is currently considered to be endemic to Pakistan. This species weighs an average birth weight 0.48 g (0.017 oz)

== Distribution ==
The species has been recorded from Pakistan and may occur in Afghanistan. It frequents sand dunes, gravel flats and plains in hot deserts.

Despite its small size, the jerboa is an incredibly resilient animal that is well suited to the harsh desert environment, where daytime and nighttime temperatures vary significantly. In addition to allowing it to hop across hot sands, its strong hind legs let it to make quick escapes from predators, which is crucial for its survival.

== Ecology ==
These nocturnal jerboas move through its dry desert habitat in long hops, balancing with the tail. They live in burrows generally excavated under small bushes. They feed on wind blown seeds, succulent leaves of desert-adapted vegetation, and various dead animals such as other rodents and lizards; food is raised to the mouth using the hands. As plants dry up, they are often left to dig up roots of desert plants and feast on them. They are omnivores. They undergo a diurnal rhythm of physiological dormancy, when their bodily functions, including respiration and blood circulation, slow down dramatically. This is known as facultative hypothermia and enables the species to survive on a diet of low nutritional value. Two to four young, blind and naked at birth, are born in the spring and summer months. No more than two litters a year are normally produced.

== Lifespan ==
Pale pygmy jerboas have a maximum lifespan of 2.5 years in the wild and 3 years in captivity. Causes of death are not well-studied; however, low predation rates and parasite loads suggest that disease or old age are likely causes.

== Predators ==
The natural predators of the jerboa are the leaf-nosed viper (Eristocophis mcmahoni), the trans-Caspian monitor lizard (Varanus caspius), and the sand cat (Felis margarita).

== See also ==
- Smallest organisms
