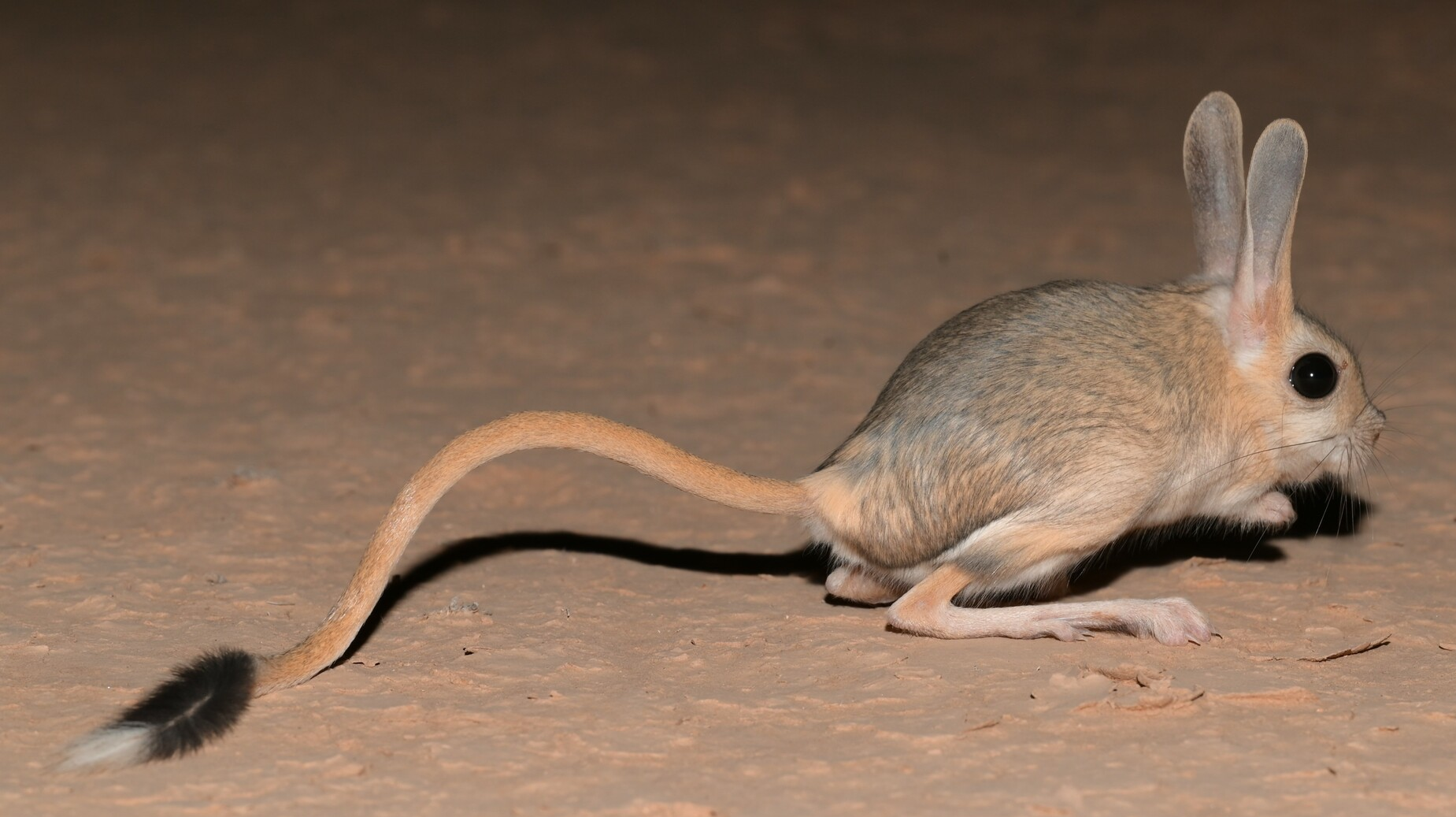
- Euphrates jerboa near Rafha, Saudi Arabia
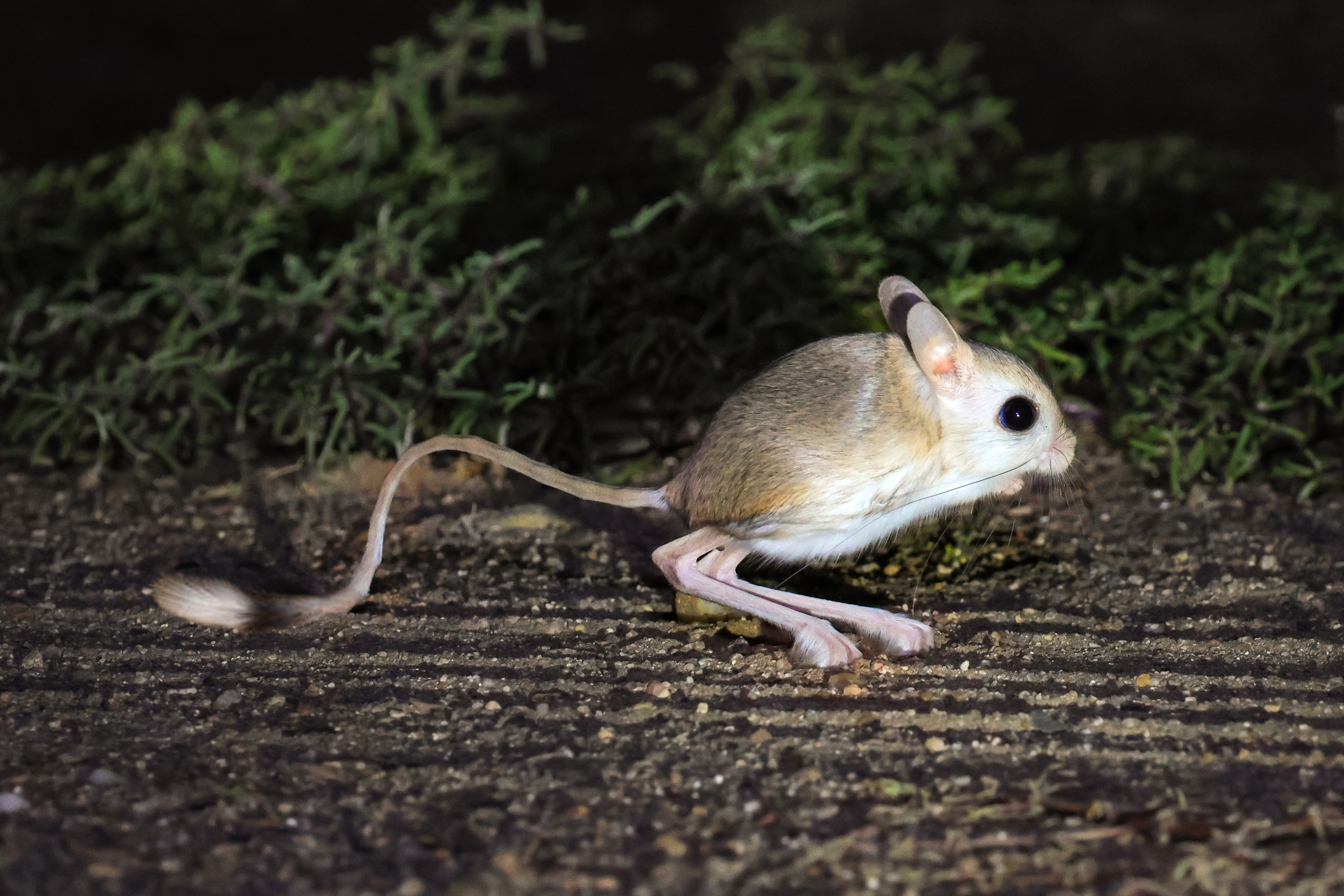
- Lesser Egyptian jerboa in Red Sea Coast, Saudi Arabia

Scientific classification
- Kingdom: Animalia
- Phylum: Chordata
- Class: Mammalia
- Order: Rodentia
- Superfamily: Dipodoidea
- Family: Dipodidae; Fischer de Waldheim, 1817

Subfamilies
- Allactaginae; Cardiocraniinae; Dipodinae; Euchoreutinae – long-eared jerboa
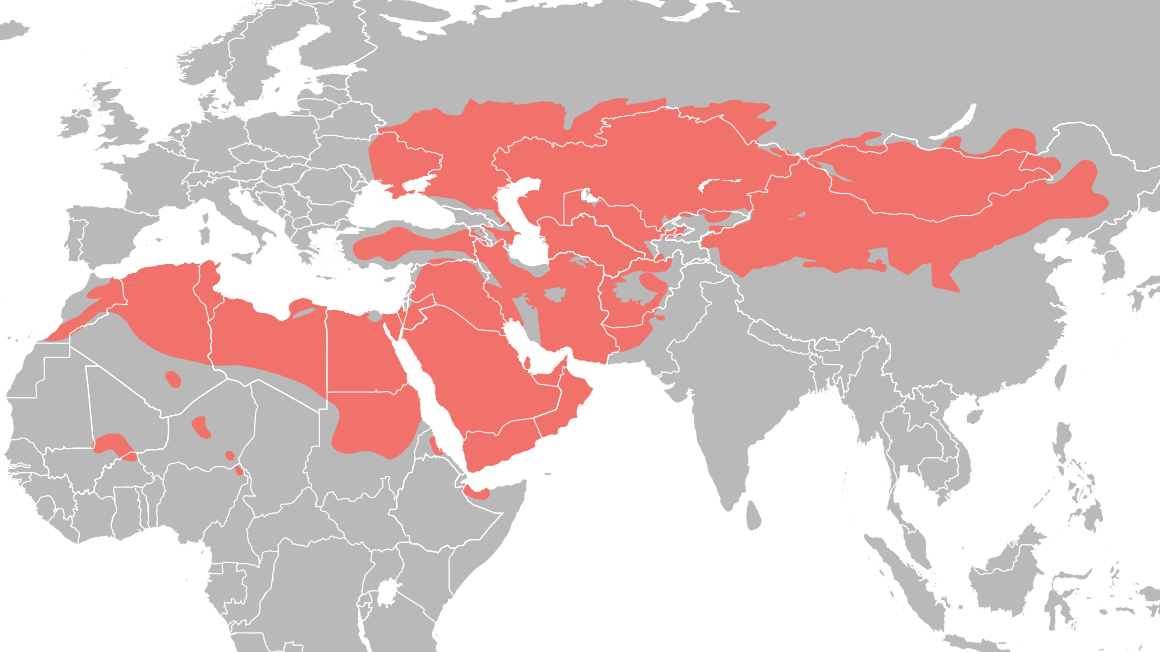
- Dipodidae distribution

= Jerboa =

Jerboa Temporal range: Middle Miocene–recent

Family of rodents

Jerboas (/dʒɜːrˈboʊə/) are the members of the family Dipodidae. They are nocturnal hopping desert rodents found throughout North Africa and Asia. They tend to live in hot deserts.

When chased, jerboas can run at up to 24 km/h (15 mph). Some species are preyed on by little owls (Athene noctua) in central Asia. Most species of jerboas have excellent hearing that they use to avoid becoming the prey of nocturnal predators. The typical lifespan of a jerboa is around 2–3 years.

== Taxonomy ==
Jerboas, as previously defined, were paraphyletic, with the jumping mice (Zapodidae), birch mice (Sminthidae) and springhares (Pedetidae) also being classified in the family Dipodidae. Phylogenetic analysis split all three as distinct families, leaving just the jerboas in Dipodidae as a monophyletic group.

This animal has a body length (including the head) of between 4 and 26 cm (1.6 and 10.2 in), with an additional 7–30 cm (2.8–11.8 in) of tail, which is always longer than the full body.

Jerboa dental records reveal a slow increase in crown heights, which corresponds to a more open and drier ecosystem.

== Anatomy and body features ==
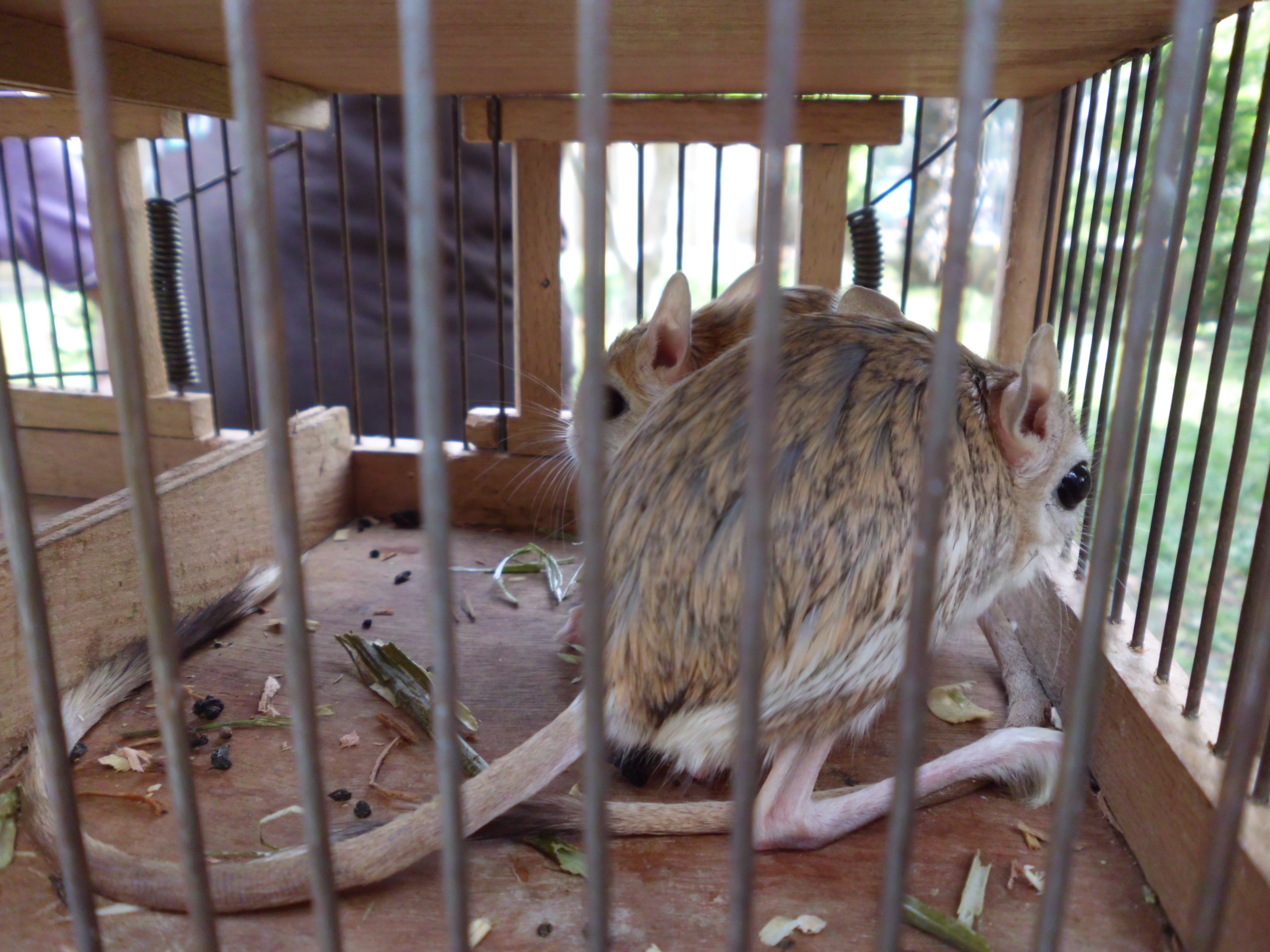
2 captive jerboas in cage

Jerboas look somewhat like miniature kangaroos, and have some external similarities. Both have long hind legs, short forelegs, and long tails. Jerboas move around in a similar manner to kangaroos, which is by hopping, or saltation. However, their anatomy is more attuned towards erratic hopping locomotion, making use of sharp turns and great vertical leaps to confuse and escape predators, rather than for sustained hopping over long periods of time. Researchers have found that, when jerboas execute their vertical leaps, the primary tendons in the hindlimbs only recovered and reused on average 4.4% of energy contributed to the jump; this is lower than many hopping animals. Unlike other hopping mammals which are facultative bipeds, jerboas do not use their forelimbs to walk at slower speeds; instead, unlike nearly any other mammal apart from humans, they almost exclusively move on two legs, making them obligate bipeds.

Jerboas have metatarsal bones that are fused into one long bone, called the cannon bone. Their cannon bone is more distinct and defined than in other rodents. This acts as leverage to allow them to reach higher heights while jumping, while also supporting the legs. Their back legs are often up to four times as long as the front legs. This further allows them to sling-shot themselves into the air. Jerboas that live in sandy desert environments develop hairs on the bottom of their feet that allow for better traction and grip so that they don't slip in the sand.

As in other bipedal animals, their foramen magnum—the hole at the base of the skull—is forward-shifted, which enhances two-legged locomotion. The tail of a jerboa can be longer than its head and body, and a white cluster of hair is commonly seen at the tip of the tail. Jerboas use their tails to balance when hopping and as a prop when sitting upright. Jerboa fur is fine and usually the colour of sand. This colour usually matches the jerboa's habitat (an example of cryptic colouration). Some species of the jerboa family have long ears like a rabbit, whilst others have ears that are short like those of a mouse or rat.

In addition to the jerboa's large ears, they also have large feet which are a result of multiple genes overlapping each other in their DNA. Researchers found a gene called the shox2 gene that is expressed in jerboa feet. This gene has the ability to turn other genes on and off and has been seen to cause mutant limbs.

== Behavior ==
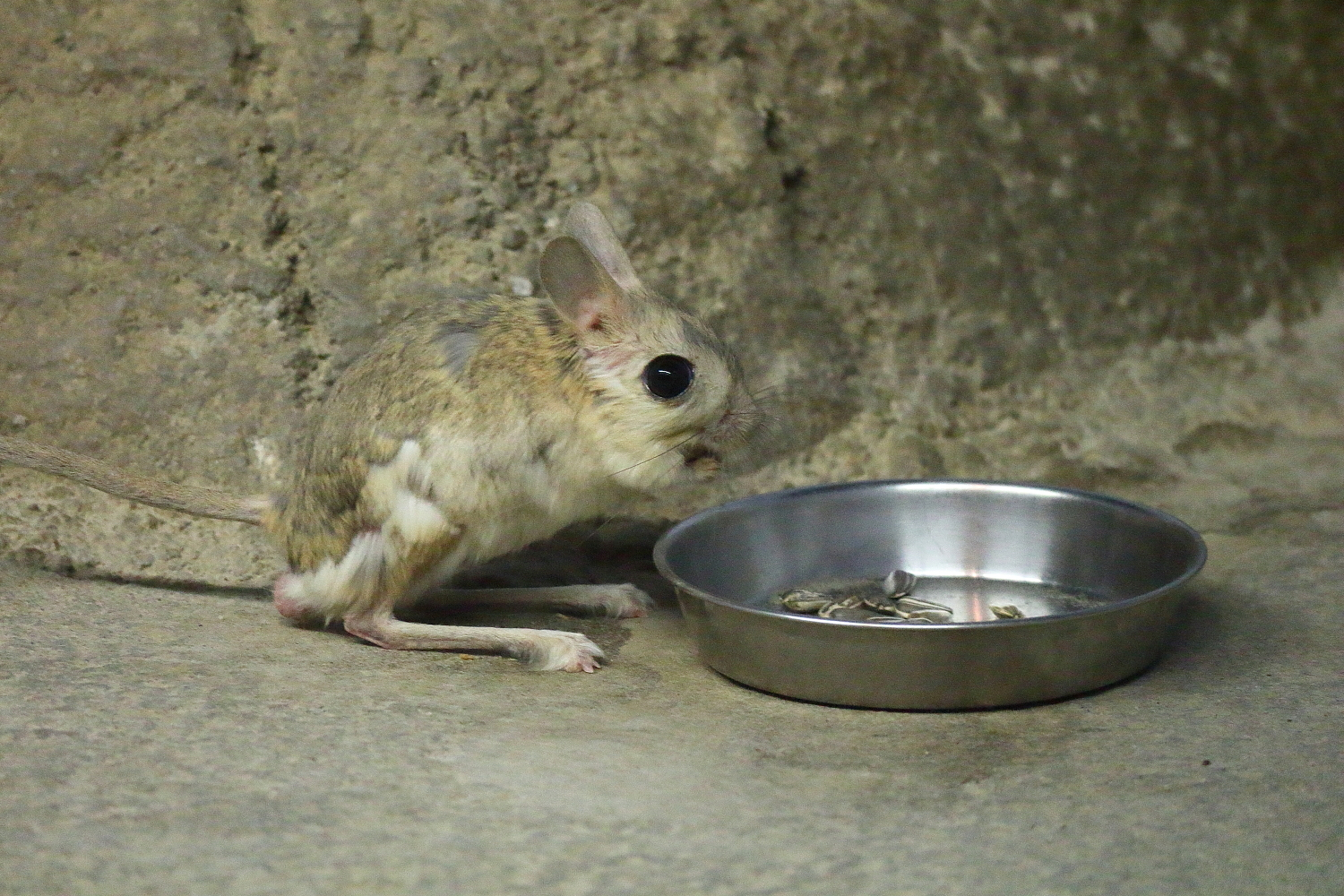
Greater Egyptian jerboa, Jaculus orientalis, Higashiyama Zoo

The bipedal locomotion of jerboas involves hopping, skipping, and running gaits, associated with rapid and frequent, difficult-to-predict changes in speed and direction, facilitating predator evasion relative to quadrupedal locomotion. This may explain why evolution of bipedal locomotion is favored in desert-dwelling rodents that forage in open habitats.

Jerboas can hop 10–13 cm (4–5 in) normally but if threatened by a predator the jerboa can jump up to 3 m (10 ft).

Jerboas are most active at twilight (crepuscular). During the heat of the day, they shelter in burrows. At night, they leave the burrows due to the cooler temperature of their environment. They dig the entrances to their burrow near plant life, especially along field borders. During the rainy season, they make tunnels in mounds or hills to reduce the risk of flooding. In the summer, jerboas occupying holes plug the entrance to keep out hot air and, some researchers speculate, predators. In most cases, burrows are constructed with an emergency exit that ends just below the surface or opens at the surface but is not strongly obstructed. This allows the jerboa to quickly escape predators.

Since jerboas dig in the sand, they have adapted to that environment by developing skin folds and hair that protects their ears and nose from getting sand inside them.

Related jerboas often create four types of burrows. A temporary, summer day burrow is used for cover while hunting during the daylight. They have a second, temporary burrow used for hunting at night. They also have two permanent burrows: one for summer and one for winter. The permanent summer burrow is actively used throughout the summer and the young are raised there. Jerboas hibernate during the winter and use the permanent winter burrow for this. Temporary burrows are shorter in length than permanent burrows. Just like other animals that hibernate, these creatures are heavier pre-hibernation specifically in ungrazed sites (Shuai). Also, more food availability during pre-hibernation contributes to larger jerboa body mass in ungrazed regions, and entices more jerboas to migrate to ungrazed areas during post-hibernation. Grazing negatively impacts the jerboa pre- and post-hibernation population, but not the survival rate.

Jerboas create burrows to function as protection against predators and severe weather conditions. They will naturally respond to winter conditions such as cold temperatures and food deprivation by digging a winter burrow to hibernate in. Winter burrows are most often longer, deeper, and have more entrance holes than summer burrows. Additionally, they use these burrows as nesting areas to raise their young. They can also function as feeding sites.

Jerboas are solitary creatures. Once they reach adulthood, they usually have their own burrow and search for food on their own. However, occasional "loose colonies" may form, whereby some species of jerboa dig communal burrows that offer extra warmth when it is cold outside.

== Diet ==
Most jerboas rely on plant material as the main component of their diet, but they cannot eat hard seeds. Some species opportunistically eat other jerboas and other animals they come across. Unlike gerbils, jerboas are not known to store their food.

Some species of Jerboa are known to have a diet that consists of insects, plants, and sometimes soft seeds. They use their two front legs to gather food.

Jerboas do not drink water but instead get their water intake from the food they eat. Jerboas like desert plants; they are best when they are wet but when dried out the jerboas will dig the plants up and eat the roots because that part of the plant holds the most water. Jerboas will also try to minimize water loss by feeding at night when it is cooler in the desert.

== Communication and perception ==
Many species within the family Dipodidae engage in dust bathing, often a way to use chemical communication. Their keen hearing suggests they may use sounds or vibrations to communicate.

== Reproduction ==
Mating systems of closely related species in the family Dipodidae suggest that they may be polygynous. For some closely related jerboa species, mating usually happens a short time after awaking from winter hibernation. A female breeds twice in the summer, and raises from two to six young. Gestation time is between 25 and 35 days. Little is known about parental investment in long-eared jerboas. Like most mammals, females nurse and care for their young at least until they are weaned.

Food conditions become abundant typically in the spring and summer. This is also when reproduction rates in the jerboas increase. Jerboas have cells that produce sex hormones known as the gonadotropin-releasing hormone (GnRH). These cells fire the most in the months of March through July. These cells quit producing GnRH in the autumn, and the jerboa's mating season ends.

== Classification ==
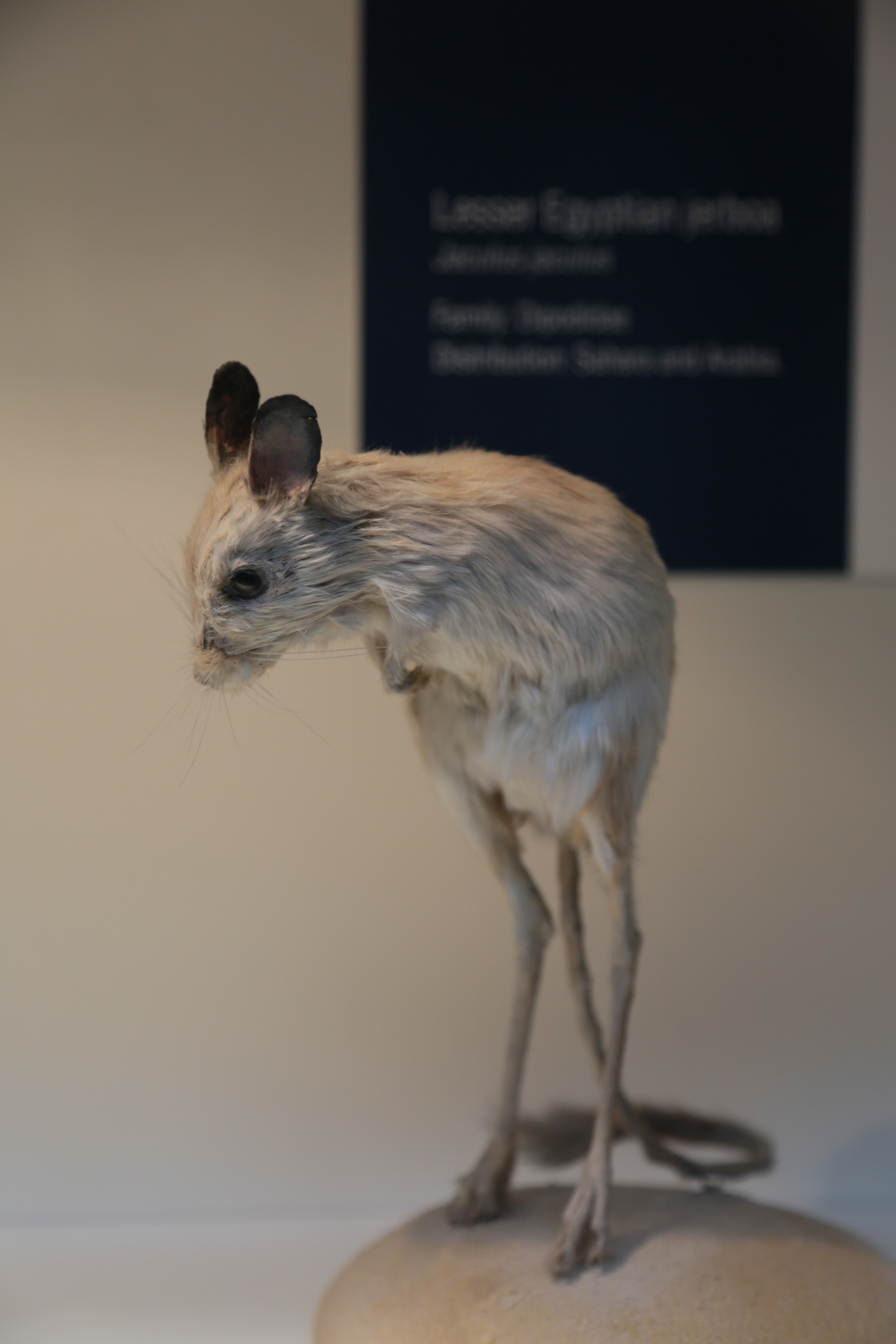
Stuffed specimen of a jerboa

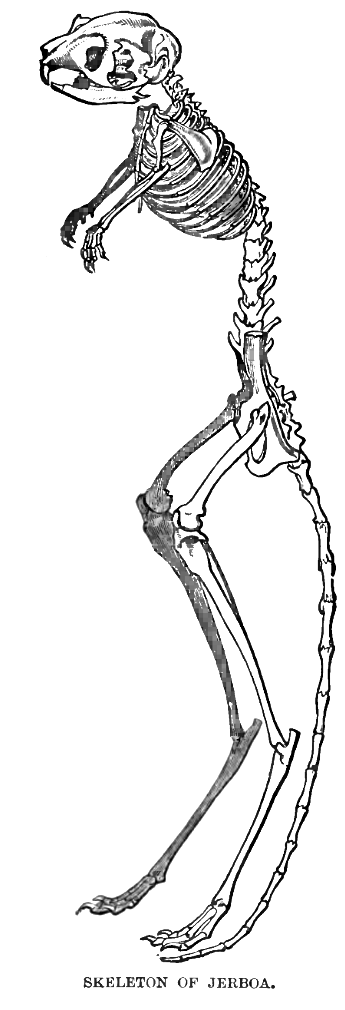
Skeleton of a jerboa

- Family Dipodidae
  - Subfamily Cardiocraniinae
    - Cardiocranius
      - Five-toed pygmy jerboa, Cardiocranius paradoxus
    - Salpingotus
      - Thick-tailed pygmy jerboa, Salpingotus crassicauda
      - Heptner's pygmy jerboa, Salpingotus heptneri
      - Kozlov's pygmy jerboa, Salpingotus kozlovi
      - Pallid pygmy jerboa, Salpingotus pallidus
      - Thomas's pygmy jerboa, Salpingotus thomasi
    - Salpingotulus
      - Baluchistan pygmy jerboa, Salpingotulus michaelis
  - Subfamily Dipodinae
    - Dipus
      - Northern three-toed jerboa, Dipus sagitta
    - Eremodipus
      - Lichtenstein's jerboa, Eremodipus lichensteini
    - Jaculus
      - Blanford's jerboa, Jaculus blanfordi
      - Lesser Egyptian jerboa, Jaculus jaculus
      - Greater Egyptian jerboa, Jaculus orientalis
    - Stylodipus
      - Andrews's three-toed jerboa, Stylodipus andrewsi
      - Mongolian three-toed jerboa, Stylodipus sungorus
      - Thick-tailed three-toed jerboa, Stylodipus telum
  - Subfamily Euchoreutinae
    - Euchoreutes
      - Long-eared jerboa, Euchoreutes naso
  - Subfamily Allactaginae
    - Allactaga
      - Balikun jerboa, Allactaga balikunica
      - Gobi jerboa, Allactaga bullata
      - Iranian jerboa, Allactaga firouzi
      - Hotson's jerboa, Allactaga hotsoni
      - Great jerboa, Allactaga major
      - Severtzov's jerboa, Allactaga severtzovi
      - Mongolian five-toed jerboa, Allactaga sibirica
    - Allactodipus
      - Bobrinski's jerboa, Allactodipus bobrinskii
    - Pygeretmus
      - Lesser fat-tailed jerboa, Pygeretmus platyurus
      - Dwarf fat-tailed jerboa, Pygeretmus pumilio
      - Greater fat-tailed jerboa, Pygeretmus shitkovi
    - Scarturus
      - Small five-toed jerboa, Scarturus elater
      - Euphrates jerboa, Scarturus euphraticus
      - Four-toed jerboa, Scarturus tetradactylus
      - Vinogradov's jerboa, Scarturus vinogradovi
      - Williams's jerboa, Scarturus williamsi
  - Subfamily Paradipodinae
    - Paradipus
      - Comb-toed jerboa, Paradipus ctenodactylus

== See also ==
- Hopping mouse – a similar murid rodent native to Australia; an example of parallel evolution
- Jumping mouse – a nondesert-dwelling relative of jerboas in the family Zapodidae, native to China and North America
- Kangaroo rat and kangaroo mouse – similar heteromyid rodents native to North America; an example of convergence
- Kultarr – a marsupial with a similar body plan and coloration; another example of convergence; they use quadrupedal locomotion, but their large aerial phases cause them to be confused with hopping mice
- Springhare – a similar pedetid rodent native to southern and eastern Africa
