= Lichtenstein's jerboa =

Conservation status
- Least Concern (IUCN 3.1)

Scientific classification
- Kingdom: Animalia
- Phylum: Chordata
- Class: Mammalia
- Order: Rodentia
- Family: Dipodidae
- Subfamily: Dipodinae
- Tribe: Dipodini
- Genus: Eremodipus; Vinogradov, 1930
- Species: E. lichtensteini

Binomial name
- Eremodipus lichtensteini (Vinogradov, 1927)

Species of rodent

Lichtenstein's jerboa (Eremodipus lichtensteini) is a species of rodent in the family Dipodidae. It is monotypic within the genus Eremodipus. It is found in Kazakhstan, Turkmenistan, and Uzbekistan.
