= Pygeretmus =

Pygeretmus Temporal range: Late Pliocene - Recent

Scientific classification
- Kingdom: Animalia
- Phylum: Chordata
- Class: Mammalia
- Infraclass: Placentalia
- Order: Rodentia
- Family: Dipodidae
- Subfamily: Allactaginae
- Genus: Pygeretmus; Gloger, 1841

Type species
- Dipus platurus Lichtenstein, 1823 (amended to Dipus platyurus)

Species
- Pygeretmus platyurus Pygeretmus pumilio Pygeretmus shitkovi
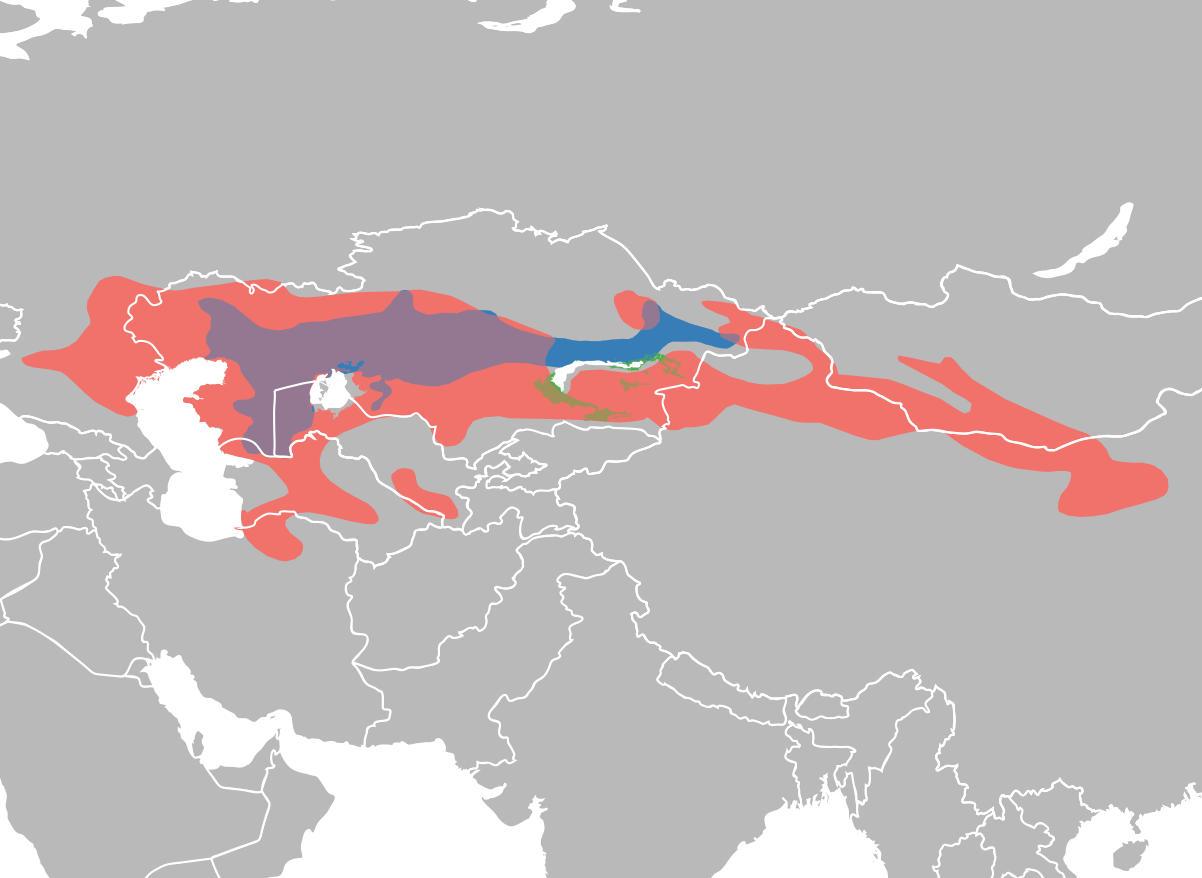
- Pygeretmus distribution P. pumilio in red, P. platyurus in blue, P. zhitkovi in green

Genus of rodents

Pygeretmus is a genus of rodent in the family Dipodidae. It contains the following species:

- Lesser fat-tailed jerboa (Pygeretmus platyurus)
- Dwarf fat-tailed jerboa (Pygeretmus pumilio)
- Greater fat-tailed jerboa (Pygeretmus shitkovi)
