= Bobrinski's jerboa =

Conservation status
- Least Concern (IUCN 3.1)

Scientific classification
- Kingdom: Animalia
- Phylum: Chordata
- Class: Mammalia
- Infraclass: Placentalia
- Order: Rodentia
- Family: Dipodidae
- Subfamily: Allactaginae
- Genus: Allactodipus; Kolesnikov, 1937
- Species: A. bobrinskii

Binomial name
- Allactodipus bobrinskii Kolesnikov, 1937
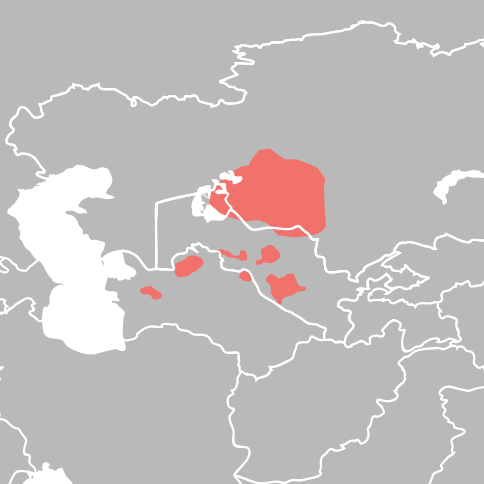
- Allactodipus bobrinskii distribution

Species of rodent

Bobrinski's jerboa (Allactodipus bobrinskii) is a species of rodent in the family Dipodidae. It is monotypic within the genus Allactodipus. It is found in Turkmenistan and Uzbekistan.
