= Comb-toed jerboa =

Conservation status
- Least Concern (IUCN 3.1)

Scientific classification
- Kingdom: Animalia
- Phylum: Chordata
- Class: Mammalia
- Order: Rodentia
- Family: Dipodidae
- Subfamily: Dipodinae
- Tribe: Paradipodini; Pavlinov & Shenbrot, 1983
- Genus: Paradipus; Vinogradov, 1930
- Species: P. ctenodactylus

Binomial name
- Paradipus ctenodactylus (Vinogradov, 1929)

Synonyms
- Scirtopoda ctenodactyla Vinogradov, 1929

Species of rodent

The comb-toed jerboa (Paradipus ctenodactylus) is a species of rodent in the family Dipodidae. It is monotypic within the genus Paradipus. It is found in Iran, Kazakhstan, Turkmenistan, and Uzbekistan.

== Distribution and habitat ==
The comb-toed jerboa can be found in the Karakum Desert in Turkmenistan, the Kyzylkum Desert in Khazakhstan, Turkmenistan, and Uzbekistan, and Dasht-e Kavir in Iran. It prefers sandy desert habitats where shrubs grow.
