= Lesser fat-tailed jerboa =

Conservation status
- Least Concern (IUCN 3.1)

Scientific classification
- Kingdom: Animalia
- Phylum: Chordata
- Class: Mammalia
- Infraclass: Placentalia
- Order: Rodentia
- Family: Dipodidae
- Genus: Pygeretmus
- Species: P. platyurus

Binomial name
- Pygeretmus platyurus (Lichtenstein, 1823)
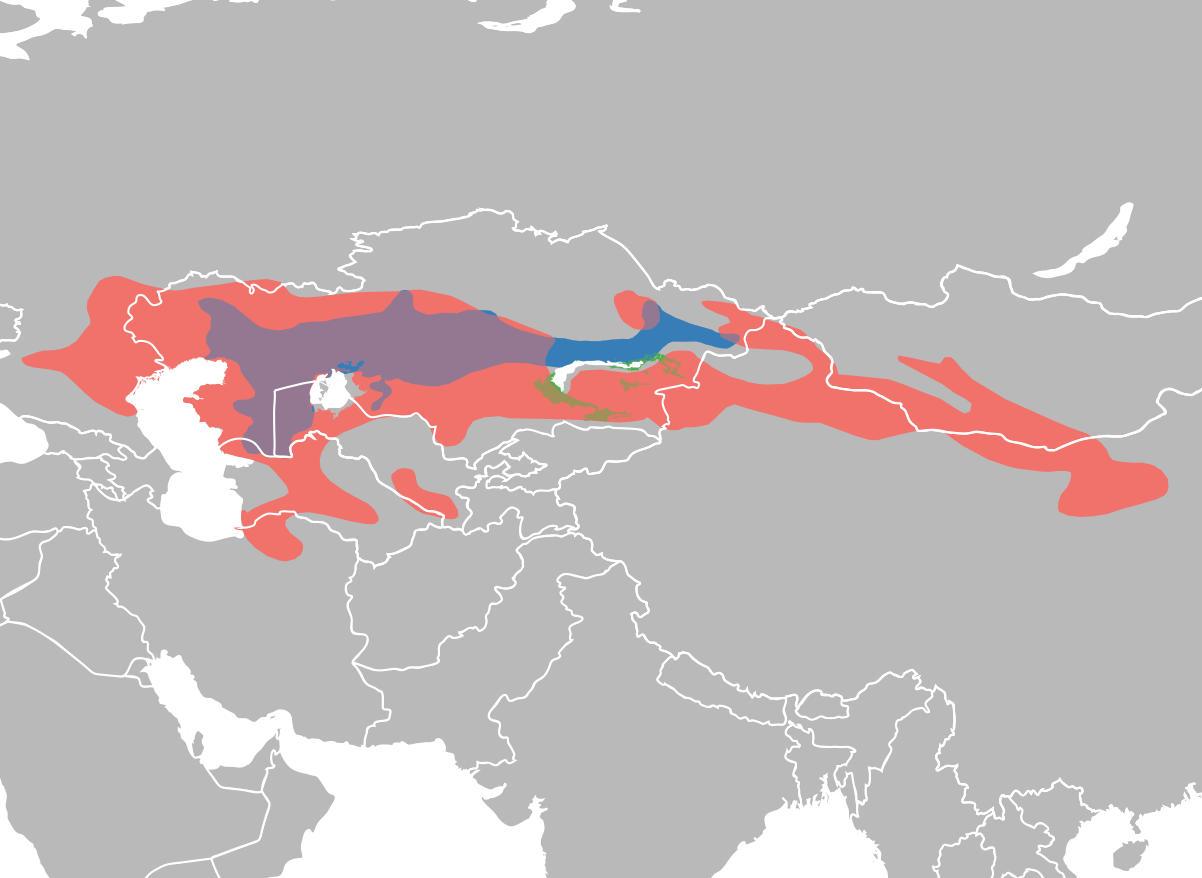
- Pygeretmus distribution P. platyurus in blue

Species of rodent

The lesser fat-tailed jerboa (Pygeretmus platyurus) is a species of rodent in the family Dipodidae. It is endemic to West, Central, and Eastern Kazakhstan, as well as Northwestern Turkmenistan.
