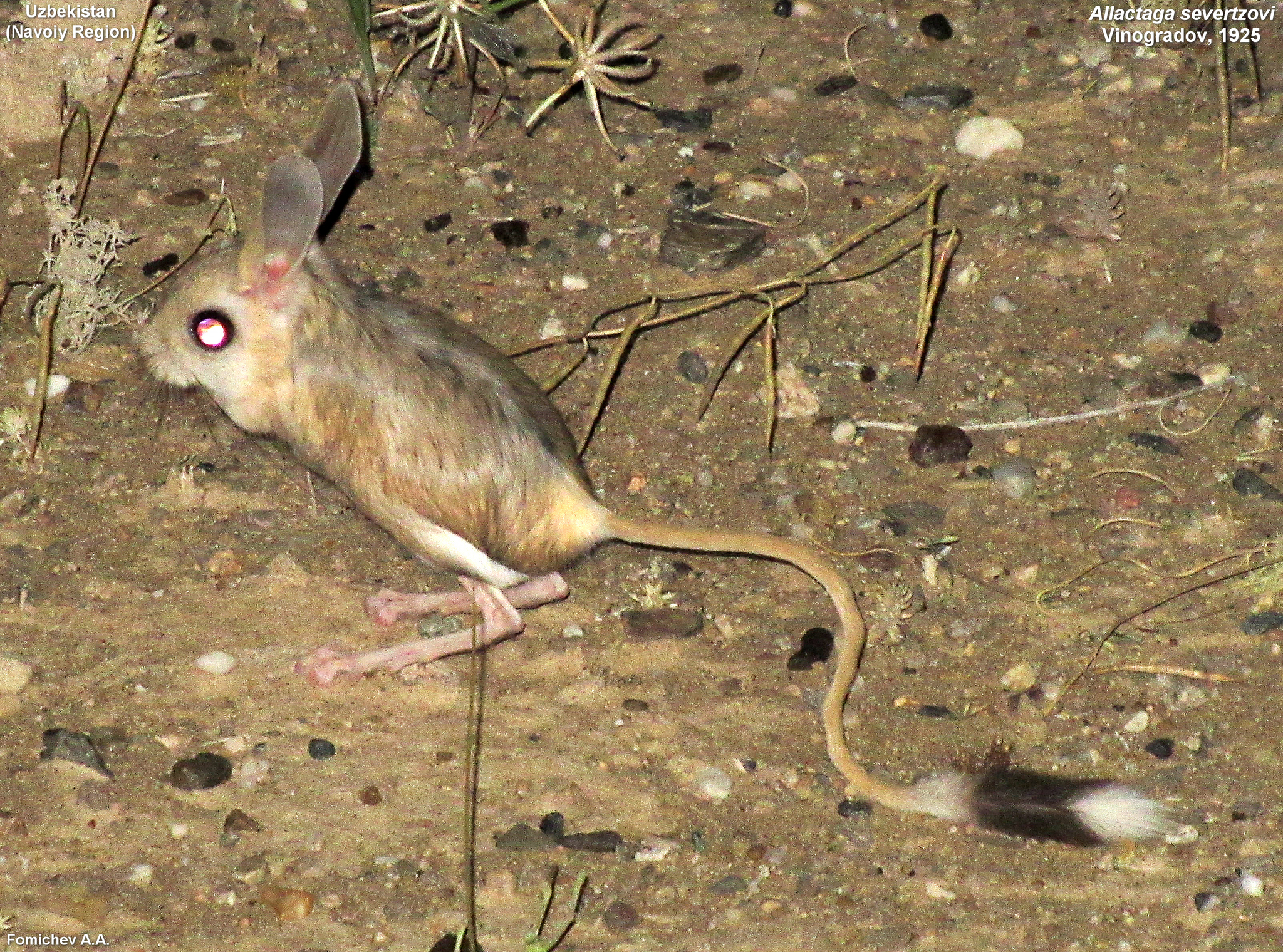

Conservation status
- Least Concern (IUCN 3.1)

Scientific classification
- Kingdom: Animalia
- Phylum: Chordata
- Class: Mammalia
- Infraclass: Placentalia
- Order: Rodentia
- Family: Dipodidae
- Genus: Allactaga
- Subgenus: Allactaga
- Species: A. severtzovi

Binomial name
- Allactaga severtzovi Vinogradov, 1925
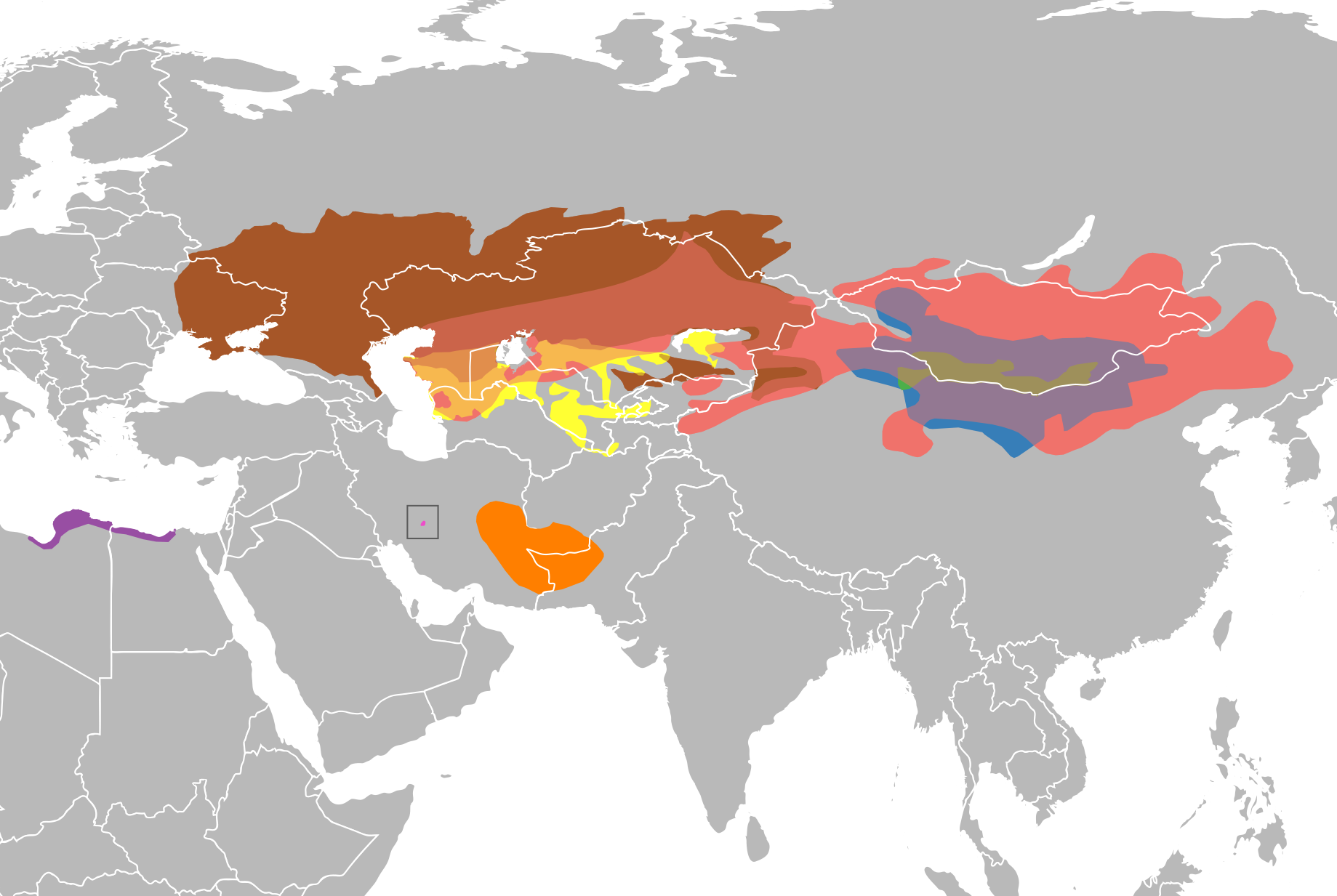
- Allactaga distribution A. severtzovi in yellow

= Severtzov's jerboa =

Species of mammal

Severtzov's jerboa (Allactaga severtzovi) is an herbivorous species of rodent in the family Dipodidae. It is found in Kazakhstan, Tajikistan, Turkmenistan, and Uzbekistan.
