= Vinogradov's jerboa =

Conservation status
- Least Concern (IUCN 3.1)

Scientific classification
- Kingdom: Animalia
- Phylum: Chordata
- Class: Mammalia
- Order: Rodentia
- Family: Dipodidae
- Genus: Scarturus
- Species: S. vinogradovi

Binomial name
- Scarturus vinogradovi (Argyropulo, 1941)

Species of mammal

Vinogradov's jerboa (Scarturus vinogradovi) is a species of rodent in the family Dipodidae. It is found in Kazakhstan, Kyrgyzstan, Tajikistan, and Uzbekistan.
