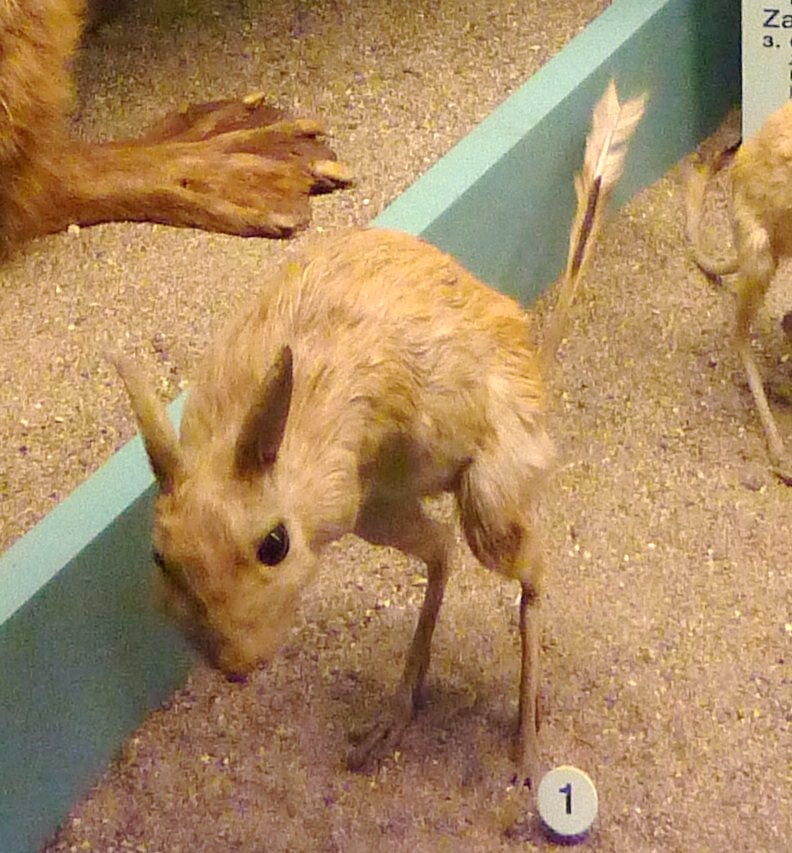

Conservation status
- Least Concern (IUCN 3.1)

Scientific classification
- Kingdom: Animalia
- Phylum: Chordata
- Class: Mammalia
- Infraclass: Placentalia
- Order: Rodentia
- Family: Dipodidae
- Genus: Allactaga
- Subgenus: Orientallactaga
- Species: A. sibirica

Binomial name
- Allactaga sibirica (Forster, 1778)
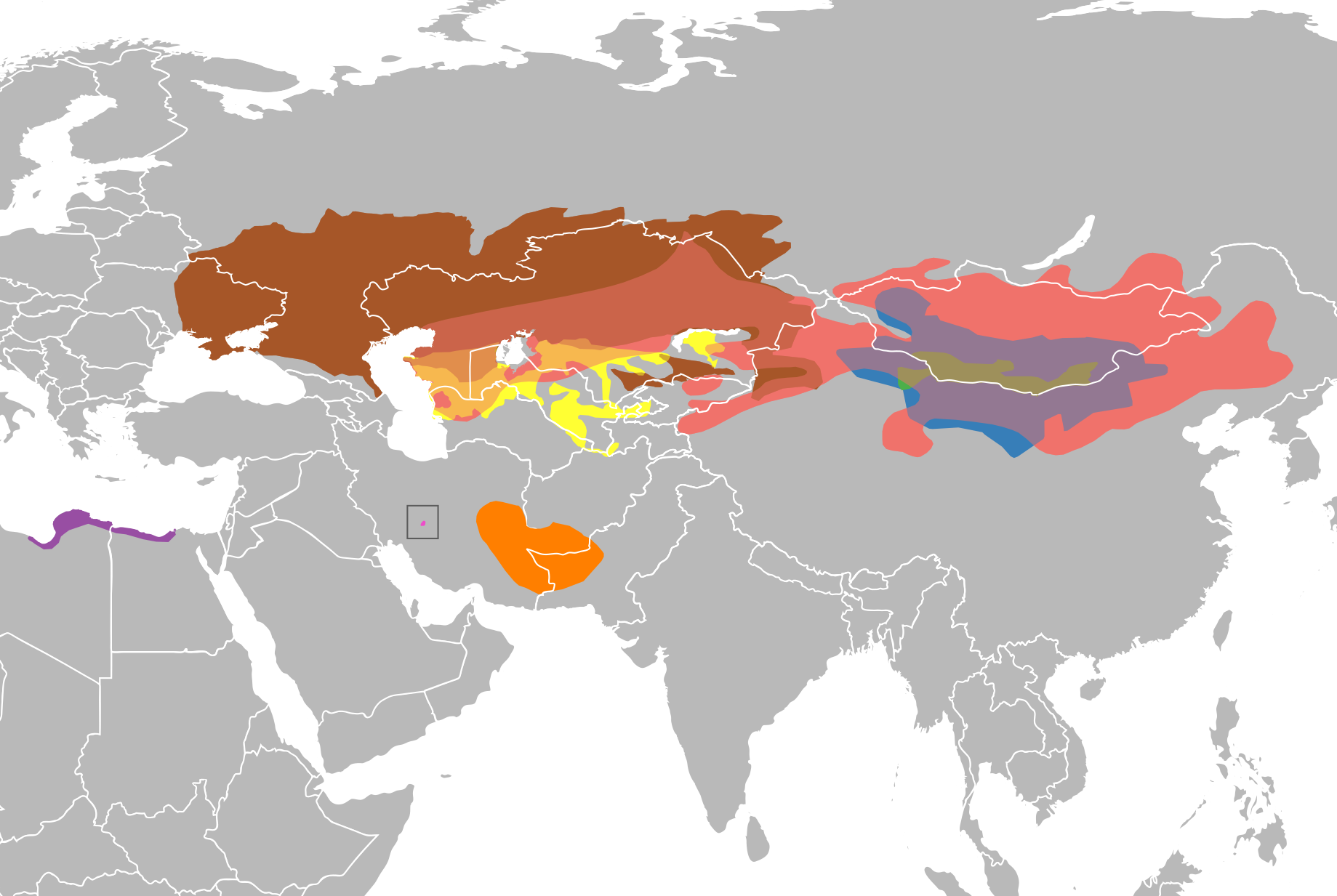
- Allactaga distribution A. sibirica in red

Synonyms
- Allactaga alactaga; Allactaga grisescens; Allactaga mongolica; Allactaga salicus; Allactaga semideserta; Allactaga suschkini; Dipus brachyurus; Dipus halticus; Dipus saltator; Yerbua sibirica

= Mongolian five-toed jerboa =

Species of mammal

The Mongolian five-toed jerboa or Siberian jerboa (Allactaga sibirica) is a species of rodent in the family Dipodidae. It is found in China, Kazakhstan, Kyrgyzstan, Mongolia, Turkmenistan, and Uzbekistan. It is the most widespread member of the subgenus Orientallactaga.
