= Gobi jerboa =

Conservation status
- Least Concern (IUCN 3.1)

Scientific classification
- Kingdom: Animalia
- Phylum: Chordata
- Class: Mammalia
- Infraclass: Placentalia
- Order: Rodentia
- Family: Dipodidae
- Genus: Allactaga
- Subgenus: Orientallactaga
- Species: A. bullata

Binomial name
- Allactaga bullata G. M. Allen, 1925
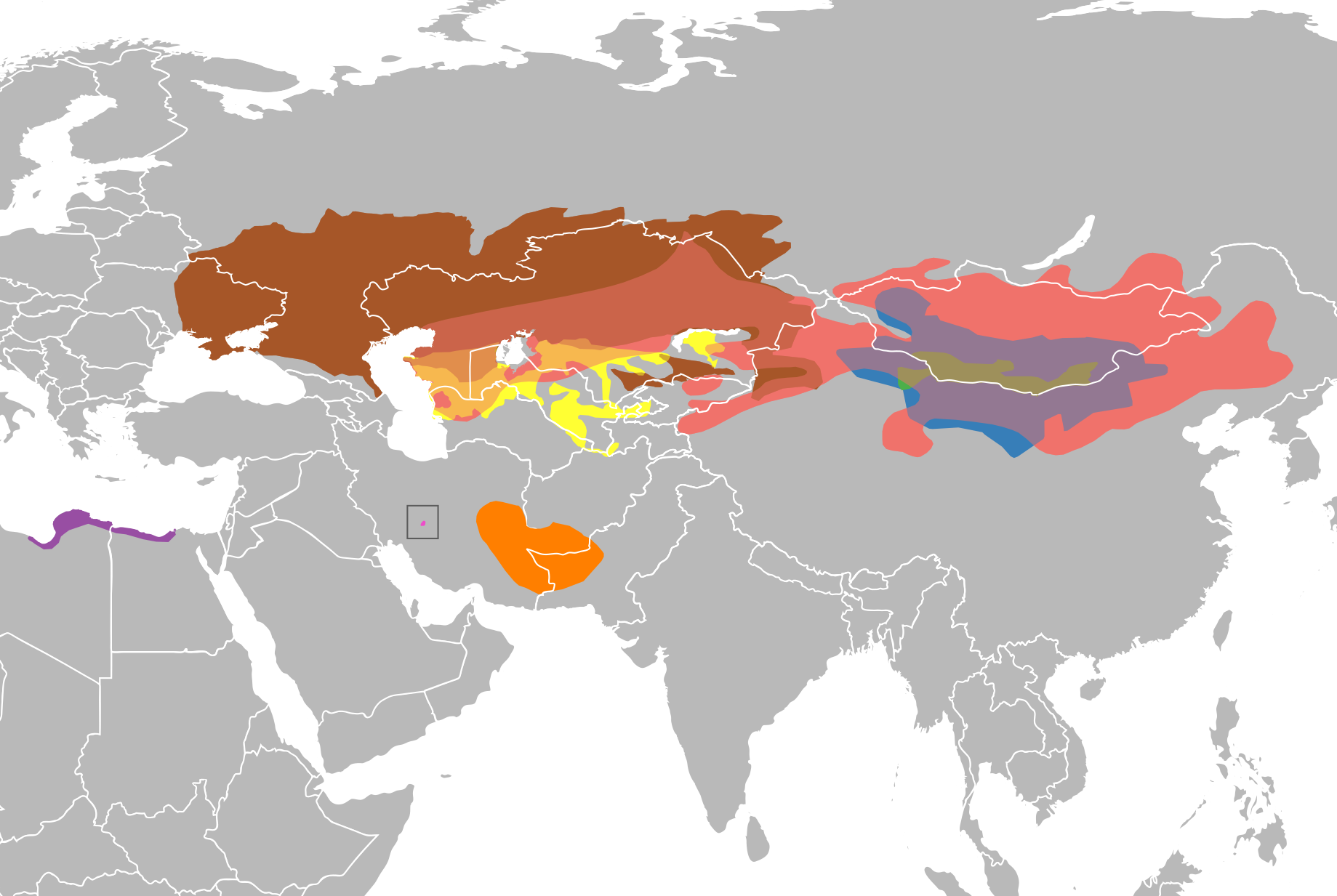
- Allactaga distribution A. bullata in blue

Species of mammal

The Gobi jerboa (Allactaga bullata) is a species of rodent in the family Dipodidae. It is found in China and Mongolia. Its natural habitats are temperate grassland and temperate desert.

The Gobi jerboa was discovered in 1925 by Glover Morrill Allen. It is found in the Gobi Desert located in northern and northwestern China, as well as in southern Mongolia, and is considered to be the most "desert loving" out of all Gobi rodents.. Allen first examined an adult male Gobi jerboa from Tsagan Nor, Outer Mongolia, which was collected on July 5, 1922 by the Central Asiatic Expeditions and housed at the American Museum of Natural History.. Allen further compared the subspecies Allactaga sibirica annulata and Allactaga sibirica sibirica, to the Gobi jerboa because they are all sympatric. Allen examined forty specimens collected from different regions of Mongolia, and found that while the Gobi jerboa was similar in color and appearance to A. sibirica annulata, by exhibiting the same grayer and buffier phases, the Gobi jerboa has shorter and broader ears, smaller hind feet, and a much larger globular audital bullae (nearly three times the size), which differentiates it from A. sibirica annulata. The Gobi jerboa was differentiated from A. sibirica sibirica because of its enlarged and globular auditory bullae, and its nearly vertical upper incisors. Today, there have been 163 recorded occurrences of the Gobi jerboa, however there is currently no known data that examines its population status.

== Range ==
The Gobi jerboa is native to China and Mongolia. In China, the Gobi jerboa extends west into Xinjiang, east into Nei Mongol, and north into Gansu. In Mongolia, the gobi jerboa can be found in the Great Lakes Depression, Valley of the Lakes, Northern Gobi, Dzungarian, Gobi Desert, Trans Altai Gobi Desert and Alashani Gobi Desert. Approximately 21% of the Gobi jerboa's range in Mongolia is in protected areas.

== Habitat ==
The Gobi jerboa is found in desert and steppe habitats, which are particularly well vegetated. Saltwort, ephedra, and desert bushes characterize these landscapes in China. The gobi jerboa are nocturnal rodents which live alone, and spend most of the daylight hours in unplugged burrows that are relatively simple, and can extend up to 60 cm (24 in) in length. These burrows are readily visible in the light sand, and contain well-defined nesting chambers without bedding. Their diet consists of seeds, roots, tubers, insects (grasshoppers and beetles), and larvae. There are no known major threats to this species.

== Breeding ==
Gobi jerboa reproduce between May and August once or twice a year, and can have between one and three offspring per litter. The mother has a rather long pregnancy, and the young are born naked and helpless. Newborn Gobi jerboas develop slower than most rodents; they are not able to jump until around 11 weeks of age and are not sexually mature until 14 weeks of age. However, although they develop slower, they tend to have a longer life expectancy than most rodents-up to 6 years in the wild.

== Physical attributes ==
The Gobi jerboa is similar to Allactaga siberica in color. Its fur is light, and the entirety of its back, as well as the outer sides of its thigh, is grayish buff. The underside of the Gobi jerboa, as well as the forearms, hind limbs, and upper lip are pure white to the roots of the hair. Additionally, a prominent hip strip adorns the outside of the hind end of the thigh. This strip is slightly more reddish in color than Allactaga balikunica. The tail is covered with well-developed tufted hairs, and while the base of the underside of the tail consists of white tufts, the inner surface is composed of a black portion with a white median longitudinal strip, and the tip of the tail is pure white. The Gobi jerboa's tail helps to accelerate its bipedal gallop (Evans and Hutchins). The auditory bullae are very large in size, and almost meet at the front of the skull. The dental formula of the Gobi jerboa is I 1/1 C 0/0 P 1/1 M 2/2. One of the most prominent features of the Gobi jerboa are their ears, since they are almost three times as large as their heads. Their large ears give them an extra keen hearing sense, which helps to serve as extra protection in their vulnerable environment. The great size of their ears also helps to cool their bodies by dissipating heat, since they reside in deserts which can get extremely hot during the day.

== Conservation actions ==
The Gobi jerboa was listed as "Least Concern" in China on the Red List Category and Criteria by the IUCN Red List of Threatened Species, and listed as "Data Deficient" in Mongolia. This ranking is based on the Gobi jerboa's wide range, presumed large population size, prevalence in protected areas, and the fact that their population is not declining at rates which would qualify the species as threatened.

== Bibliography ==
- Allen, G. M. (1938). The mammals of China and Mongolia. Central Asiatic Expeditions 1921-1930. New York, NY, USA: American Museum of Natural History.
- Batsaikhan, N.; Avirmed, D.; Shar, S.; Smith, A. T. (2008), "Allactaga bullata", The IUCN Red List of Threatened Species 2008, doi:10.2305/IUCN.UK.2008.RLTS.T852A13083763.en
- Clark, E. L.; Munkhbat, J.; Dulamtseren, S.; Baillie, J.E.M.; Batsaikhan, N.; Samiya, R.; Stubbe, M. (2006). Mongolian Red List of Mammals. Regional Red List Series. London, UK: Zoological Society of London.
- Ellerman, J. R.; Hayman, R. W.; Holt, G. W. C. (1940). The families and genera of living rodents. Vol. 1. London, England: British Museum.
- Evans, A.; Hutchins, M.; et al. (2005) [2003–2004]. "Birch Mice, Jumping Mice, and Jerboas (Dipodidae)". Grzimek's Animal Life Encyclopedia. Vol. V. Mammals (2nd ed.). Cengage Learning.
- Holden, M.E.; Musser, G.G. (2005). "Family Dipodidae". In Wilson, D.E.; Reeder, D.M. (eds.). Mammal Species of the World: A Taxonomic and Geographic Reference (3rd ed.). Johns Hopkins University Press. pp. 871–893. ISBN 978-0-8018-8221-0. OCLC 62265494.
- Mallon, D. P. (1985). "The mammals of the Mongolian People's Republic". Mammal Review. 15 (2): 71–102. Bibcode:1985MamRv..15...71M. doi:10.1111/j.1365-2907.1985.tb00389.x.
- Smith, A. and Xie, Y. (2008). The Mammals of China. Princeton, New Jersey: Princeton University Press.
- Sokolov, V. E.; Lobachev, V. S.; and Orlov, V. N. (1998). Part. 2: Dipodidae: Dipodinae, Allactaginae. The mammals of Mongolia. Moscow, Russia: Nauka.
- Wang, S. and Xie, Y. (2004). China Species Red List. Vol. 1. Beijing, China: Higher Education Press.
