= Balikun jerboa =

Conservation status
- Least Concern (IUCN 3.1)

Scientific classification
- Kingdom: Animalia
- Phylum: Chordata
- Class: Mammalia
- Infraclass: Placentalia
- Order: Rodentia
- Family: Dipodidae
- Genus: Allactaga
- Subgenus: Orientallactaga
- Species: A. balikunica

Binomial name
- Allactaga balikunica Hsia & Fang, 1964
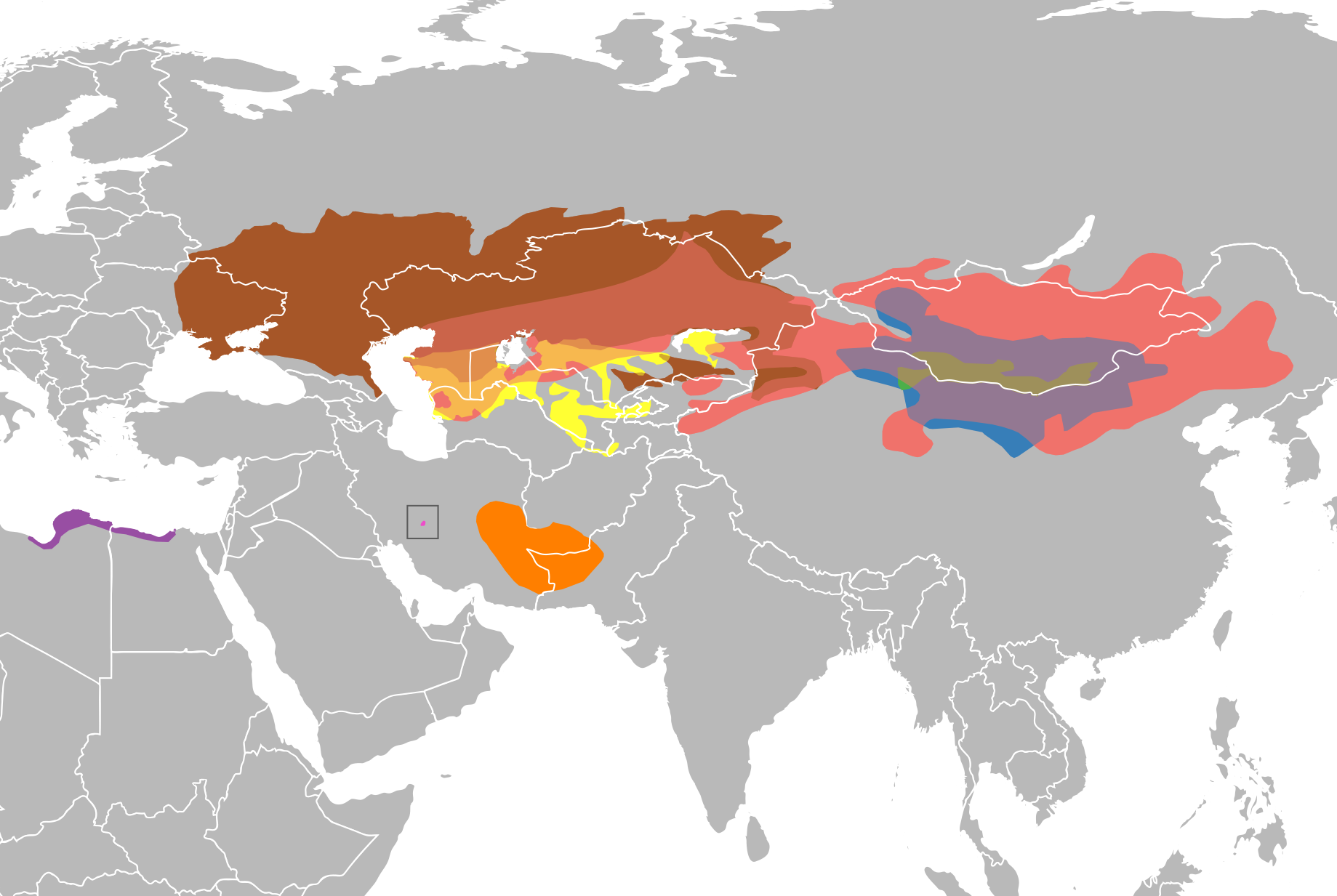
- Allactaga distribution A. balikunica in green

Synonyms
- Allactaga nataliae Sokolov, 1981

Species of mammal

The Balikun jerboa (Allactaga balikunica) is a species of rodent in the family Dipodidae. It is found in arid areas of northwestern China and Mongolia. It eats green plants, plant roots, seeds, grasshoppers and beetles.

== Description ==
The Balikun jerboa is a typical five-toed jerboa that grows to a head and body length of 115 to 132 mm (4.5 to 5.2 in) with a tail of 165 to 190 mm (6.5 to 7.5 in). The dorsal surface is yellowish-greyish-brown, each hair having a grey base, a yellow centre and a brown tip. The rump is darker and the flanks paler. The underparts, forelegs and inner surface of the hind legs are white. The tail is slender with a tuft of blackish hairs at the tip mostly growing sideways. It is similar in appearance to the Gobi jerboa (Allactaga bullata) of which it was at one time thought to be a subspecies, but the stripe of colour across the hips is slightly more reddish in colour in that species.

== Distribution and habitat ==
The Balikun jerboa is endemic to the Balikun region of Xinjiang province of China, its range extending into Mongolia where it occurs in the western parts of the Gobi Desert. Its habitat is bare sandy and rocky areas with sparse vegetation.

== Behaviour ==
The Balikun jerboa is nocturnal and lives solitarily in a burrow. It is active and is a good jumper, and feeds on plant material such as shoots, roots and grass seed as well as small insects. Little is known of its reproduction but it is thought to have two litters a year, each one consisting of one to three offspring.

== Status ==
The Balikun jerboa has a wide range and is presumed to have a large total population. No specific threats have been identified and there are several protected areas within its range, so the International Union for Conservation of Nature has assessed its conservation status as being of "least concern".

== Bibliography ==
- Holden, M.E.; Musser, G.G. (2005). "Family Dipodidae". In Wilson, D.E.; Reeder, D.M. (eds.). Mammal Species of the World: A Taxonomic and Geographic Reference (3rd ed.). Johns Hopkins University Press. pp. 871–893. ISBN 978-0-8018-8221-0. OCLC 62265494.
