= Greater fat-tailed jerboa =

Conservation status
- Least Concern (IUCN 3.1)

Scientific classification
- Kingdom: Animalia
- Phylum: Chordata
- Class: Mammalia
- Order: Rodentia
- Family: Dipodidae
- Genus: Pygeretmus
- Species: P. shitkovi

Binomial name
- Pygeretmus shitkovi (Kuznetsov, 1930)
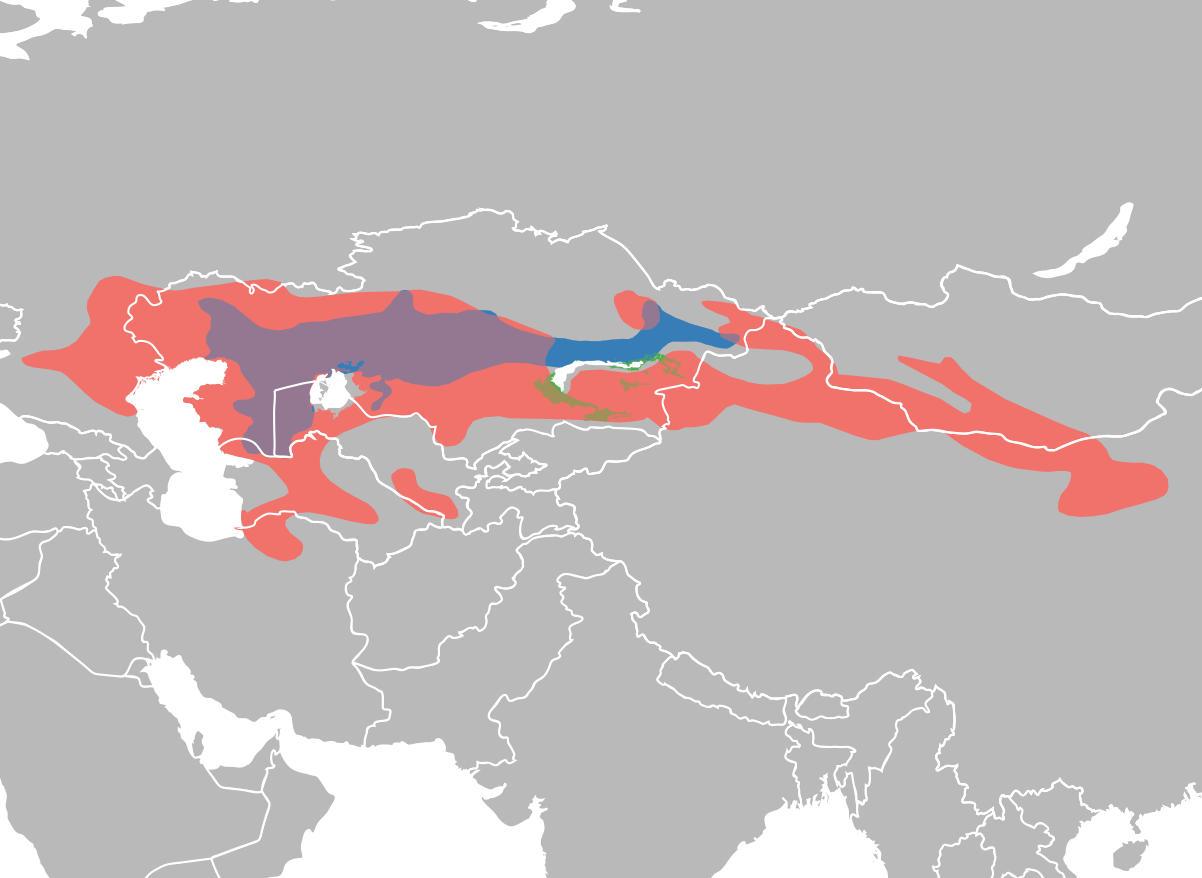
- Pygeretmus distribution P. zhitkovi in green

Synonyms
- Pygeretmus zhitkovi

Species of rodent

The greater fat-tailed jerboa (Pygeretmus shitkovi) is a species of rodent in the family Dipodidae. It is endemic to Kazakhstan. Its natural habitat is temperate desert.
