= Hotson's jerboa =

Conservation status
- Least Concern (IUCN 3.1)

Scientific classification
- Kingdom: Animalia
- Phylum: Chordata
- Class: Mammalia
- Infraclass: Placentalia
- Order: Rodentia
- Family: Dipodidae
- Genus: Allactaga
- Subgenus: Allactaga
- Species: A. hotsoni

Binomial name
- Allactaga hotsoni Thomas, 1920
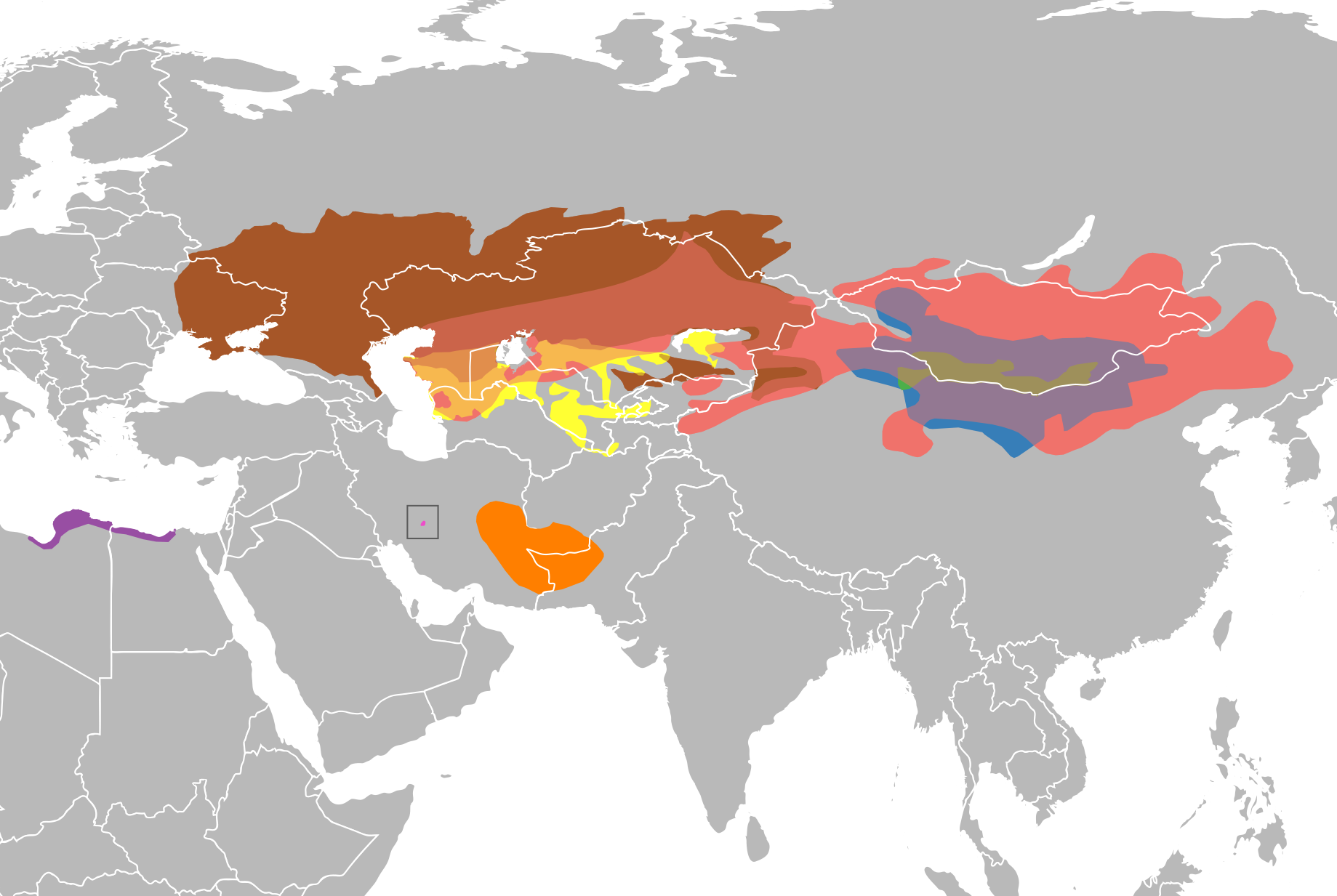
- Allactaga distribution A. hotsoni in orange

Species of mammal

Hotson's jerboa, or the Iranian jerboa (Allactaga hotsoni), is a species of rodent in the family Dipodidae. It is found in Afghanistan, Iran, and Pakistan.

== Taxonomy ==
Hotson's jerboa was first described in 1920 by the British zoologist Oldfield Thomas as Allactaga hotsoni. He named it in honour of the army officer and naturalist John Ernest Buttery Hotson, who collected plants and mammal specimens in Baluchistan during the period 1915 to 1920. The small mammals were sent to Oldfield Thomas for examination; another mammal, Hotson's mouse-like hamster (Calomyscus hotsoni), was also named after its collector.

== Distribution and habitat ==
Hotson's jerboa is native to Pakistan, Afghanistan and eastern Iran, at altitudes between 200 and 1,500 m (656 and 4,921 ft) above sea level. Its typical habitats are gravel and stony deserts and mountain steppe areas with sparse vegetation.

== Behaviour ==
Hotson's jerboa is a nocturnal, solitary rodent and digs long tunnels in hard ground in which to live. The tunnels are of three types; temporary short burrows with several entrances and several tunnels and a single chamber; breeding burrows with more and longer tunnels, more numerous entrances and a nest chamber at least 30 cm (12 in) below ground level; winter burrows with a single long tunnel, usually horizontal but with the single chamber some way beneath the ground surface, in which the animal hibernates. This jerboa feeds on seeds and such desert plants as Artemisia aucheri, Anabasis aphylla and Peganum harmala; it stores pieces of stem and leaf in storage chambers inside the burrow. It has been found that the jerboa is more active at night when the moon is not shining, and at the beginning and the end of the lunar cycle. This is likely to be an anti-predator adaptation connected with its bipedal gait and the scant vegetation in the areas it inhabits.

== Status ==
Hotson's jerboa has a wide range and is presumed to have a large total population. The population trend is unknown, but no particular threats to the animal have been detected and its habitat is of too poor quality to be worth taking under cultivation. Any decline in total population is likely to be small and the International Union for Conservation of Nature has assessed its conservation status as being of "least concern".
