= Robert Kerr (writer) =

Scottish surgeon and writer (1757–1813)

- Born: 20 October 1757; Bughtridge, Roxburghshire, Scotland
- Died: 11 October 1813 (aged 55); Edinburgh
- Education: University of Edinburgh
- Known for: The Animal Kingdom, the first two volumes of a translation of Systema Naturae of Linnaeus
- Scientific career
- Fields: Surgeon, writer on scientific and other subjects, and translator
- Workplaces: Edinburgh Foundling Hospital

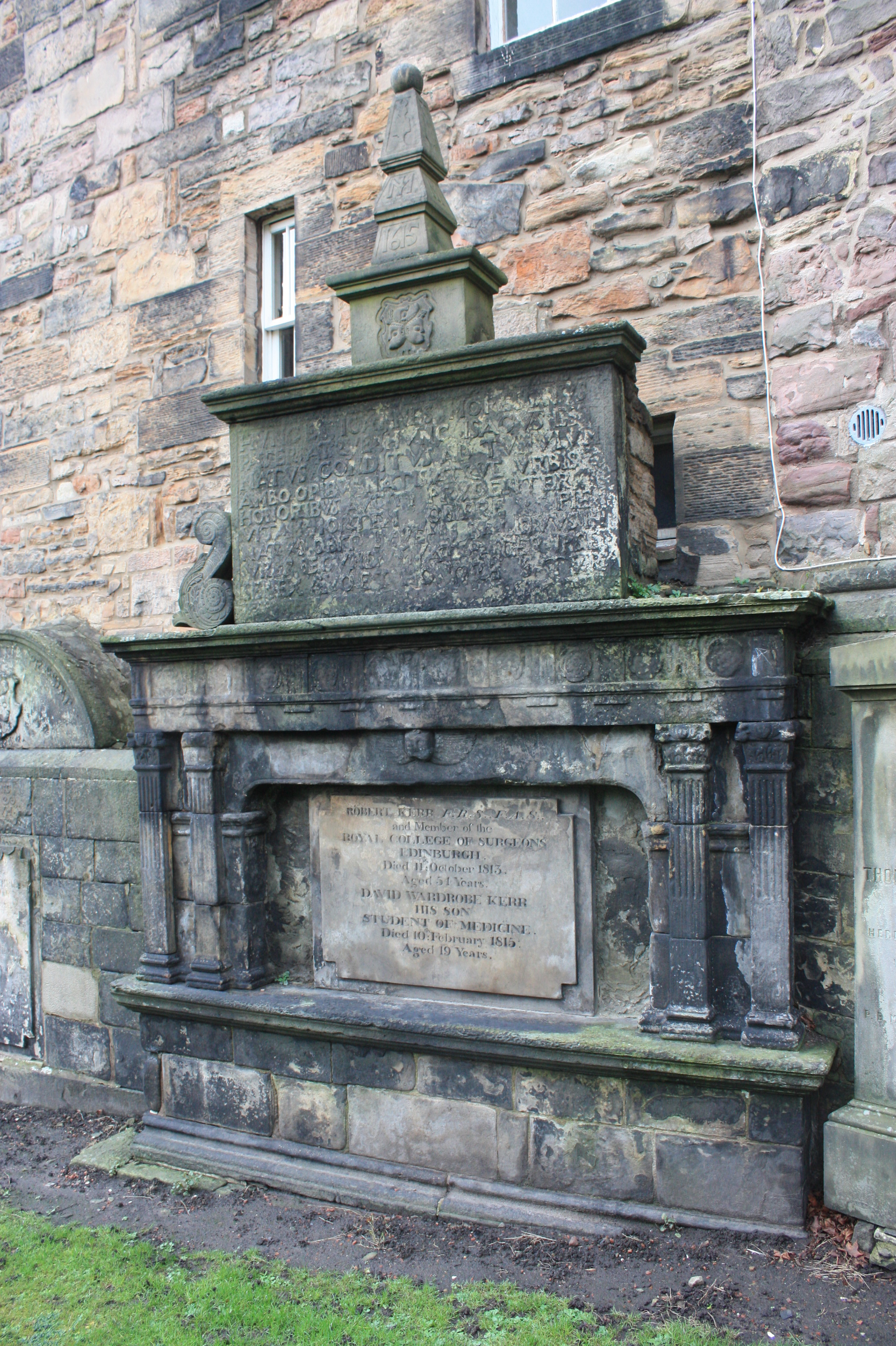
The grave of Robert Kerr, Greyfriars Kirkyard

Robert Kerr (20 October 1757 – 11 October 1813) was a Scottish surgeon, writer on scientific and other subjects, and translator.

== Life ==
Kerr was born in 1757 in Bughtridge, Roxburghshire, the son of James Kerr, a jeweller, who served as MP for Edinburgh 1747–1754, and his wife Elizabeth. He was sent to the High School in Edinburgh.

He studied medicine at the University of Edinburgh and practised at the Edinburgh Foundling Hospital as a surgeon. He was elected a Fellow of the Royal Society of Edinburgh in 1788. His proposers were Alexander Fraser Tytler, James Russell and Andrew Dalzell. At this time, he lived at Foresters Wynd off the Royal Mile in Edinburgh.

He translated several scientific works into English, such as Antoine Lavoisier's work of 1789, Traité Élémentaire de Chimie, published under the title Elements of Chemistry in a New Systematic Order containing All the Modern Discoveries, in 1790. In 1792, he published The Animal Kingdom, the first two volumes of a four-tome translation of Linnaeus' Systema Naturae, which is often cited as the taxonomic authority for a great many species. (He never translated the remaining two volumes.)

In 1794, he left his post as a surgeon to manage a paper mill at Ayton in Berwickshire which he had purchased. He lost much of his fortune with this enterprise. Out of economical necessity he began writing again in 1809, publishing a variety of minor works, for instance a General View of the Agriculture of Berwickshire. His last work was a translation of Cuvier's Recherches sur les ossements fossiles de quadrupedes, which was published after Kerr's death under the title "Essays on the Theory of the Earth".

His other works included a massive historical study entitled A General History and Collection of Voyages and Travels in eighteen volumes. Kerr began the series in 1811, dedicating it to Sir Alexander Cochrane, K.B., Vice-Admiral of the White. Publication did not cease following Kerr's death in 1813; the latter volumes were published into the 1820s.

He died at home, Hope Park House, east of the Meadows in Edinburgh, where he had lived since 1810, and is buried in Greyfriars Kirkyard in central Edinburgh against the eastern wall. His stone is added to a much earlier (1610) ornate stone monument. His son, David Wardrobe Kerr (1796–1815) lies with him.

== Selected writings ==
- Kerr, Robert (1824). A General History and Collection of Voyages and Travels, Arranged in Systematic Order: Forming a Complete History of the Origin and Progress of Navigation, Discovery, and Commerce, by Sea and Land, from the Earliest Ages to the Present Time. Edinburgh: William Blackwood.

== See also ==
- Category:Taxa named by Robert Kerr (writer)
