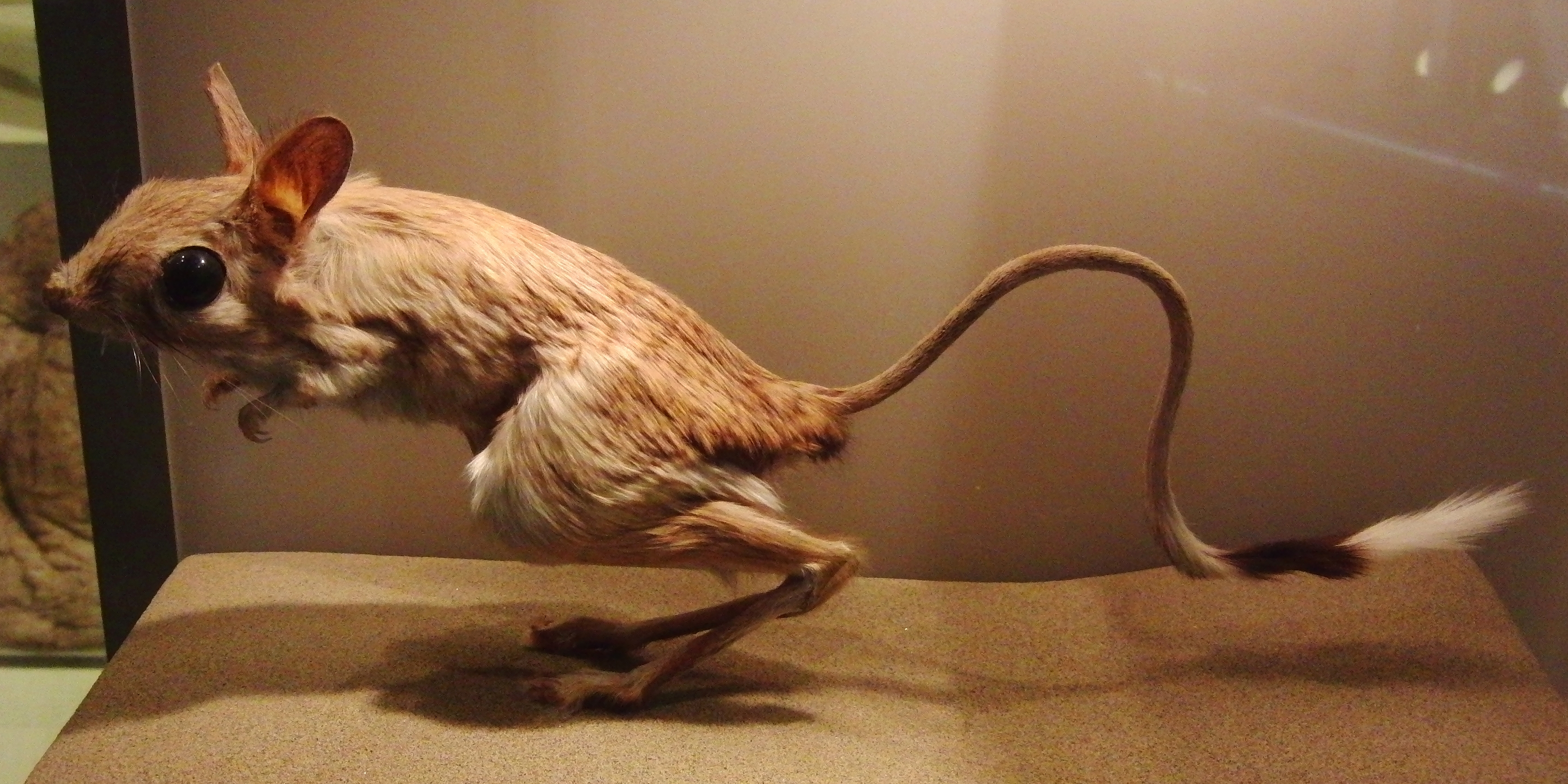
- Jaculus orientalis

Scientific classification
- Domain: Eukaryota
- Kingdom: Animalia
- Phylum: Chordata
- Class: Mammalia
- Order: Rodentia
- Family: Dipodidae
- Subfamily: Dipodinae; G. Fischer, 1817

Genera
- Dipus Zimmermann, 1780; Eremodipus Vinogradov, 1930; Jaculus Erxleben, 1777; Paradipus Vinogradov, 1930; Stylodipus Allen, 1925

= Dipodinae =

Dipodinae Temporal range: Middle Miocene - Present

Subfamily of rodents

Dipodinae is a subfamily of Dipodidae.

== Classification ==
Subfamily Dipodinae

- Tribe Dipodini
  - Genus Dipus
    - Northern three-toed jerboa, Dipus sagitta
  - Genus Eremodipus
    - Lichtenstein's jerboa, Eremodipus lichtensteini
  - Genus Jaculus
    - Blanford's jerboa, Jaculus blanfordi
    - Lesser Egyptian jerboa, Jaculus jaculus
    - Greater Egyptian jerboa, Jaculus orientalis
    - Thaler's jerboa, Jaculus thaleri
  - Genus Stylodipus, three-toed Jerboas
    - Andrews's three-toed jerboa, Stylodipus andrewsi
    - Mongolian three-toed jerboa, Stylodipus sungorus
    - Thick-tailed three-toed jerboa, Stylodipus telum
- Tribe Paradipodini
  - Genus Paradipus
    - Comb-toed jerboa, Paradipus ctenodactylus

== Notes ==
- Holden, M.E.; Musser, G.G. (2005). "Subfamily Dipodinae". In Wilson, D.E.; Reeder, D.M. (eds.). Mammal Species of the World: A Taxonomic and Geographic Reference (3rd ed.). Johns Hopkins University Press. pp. 871–893. ISBN 978-0-8018-8221-0. OCLC 62265494.
