= List of mammals of Palestine =

This is a list of mammal species recorded in the Palestinian territories of the Gaza Strip and the West Bank.

The following tags are used to highlight each species' conservation status as assessed by the International Union for Conservation of Nature:

| EX | Extinct | No reasonable doubt that the last individual has died. |
| EW | Extinct in the wild | Known only to survive in captivity or as a naturalized population well outside its previous range. |
| CR | Critically endangered | The species is in imminent risk of extinction in the wild. |
| EN | Endangered | The species is facing an extremely high risk of extinction in the wild. |
| VU | Vulnerable | The species is facing a high risk of extinction in the wild. |
| NT | Near threatened | The species does not meet any of the criteria that would categorise it as risking extinction but it is likely to do so in the future. |
| LC | Least concern | There are no current identifiable risks to the species. |
| DD | Data deficient | There is inadequate information to make an assessment of the risks to this species. |

== Order: Hyracoidea (hyraxes) ==
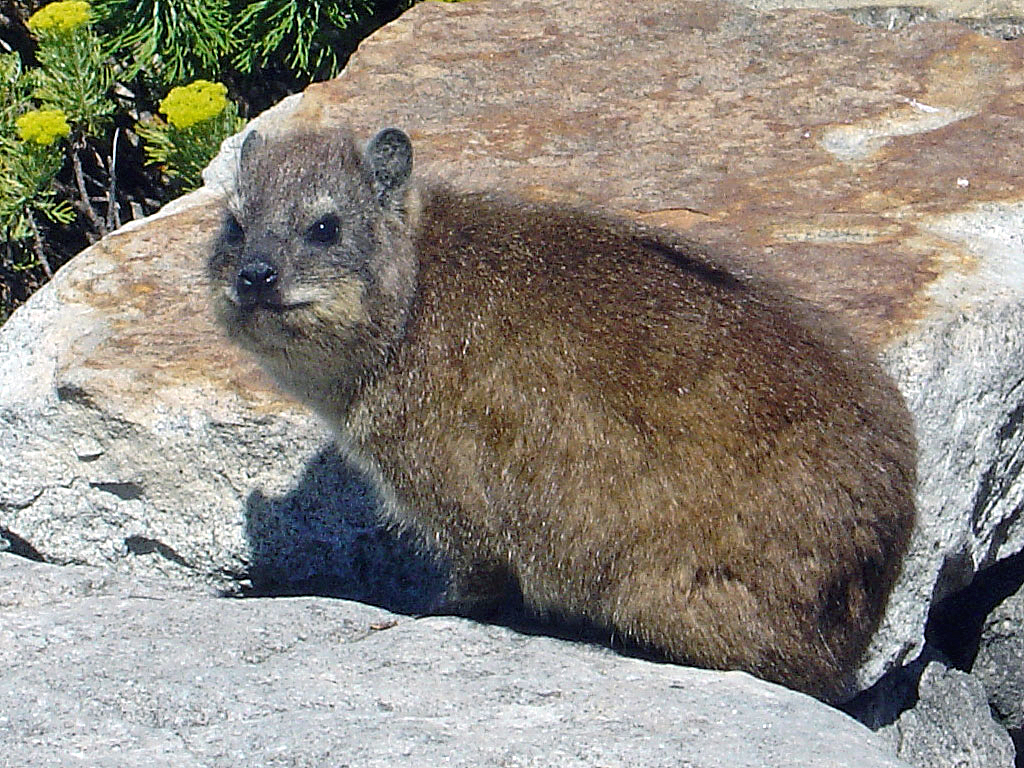
Cape hyrax

The hyraxes are four species of furry, cat-sized, thickset, herbivorous mammals that might resemble rodents at first glance, but have hooves and two caniniform incisors among other features that betray their distant evolutionary relation to elephants. They are native to Africa and the Middle East.

- Family: Procaviidae (hyraxes)
  - Genus: Procavia
    - Cape hyrax, Procavia capensis LC

== Order: Rodentia (rodents) ==
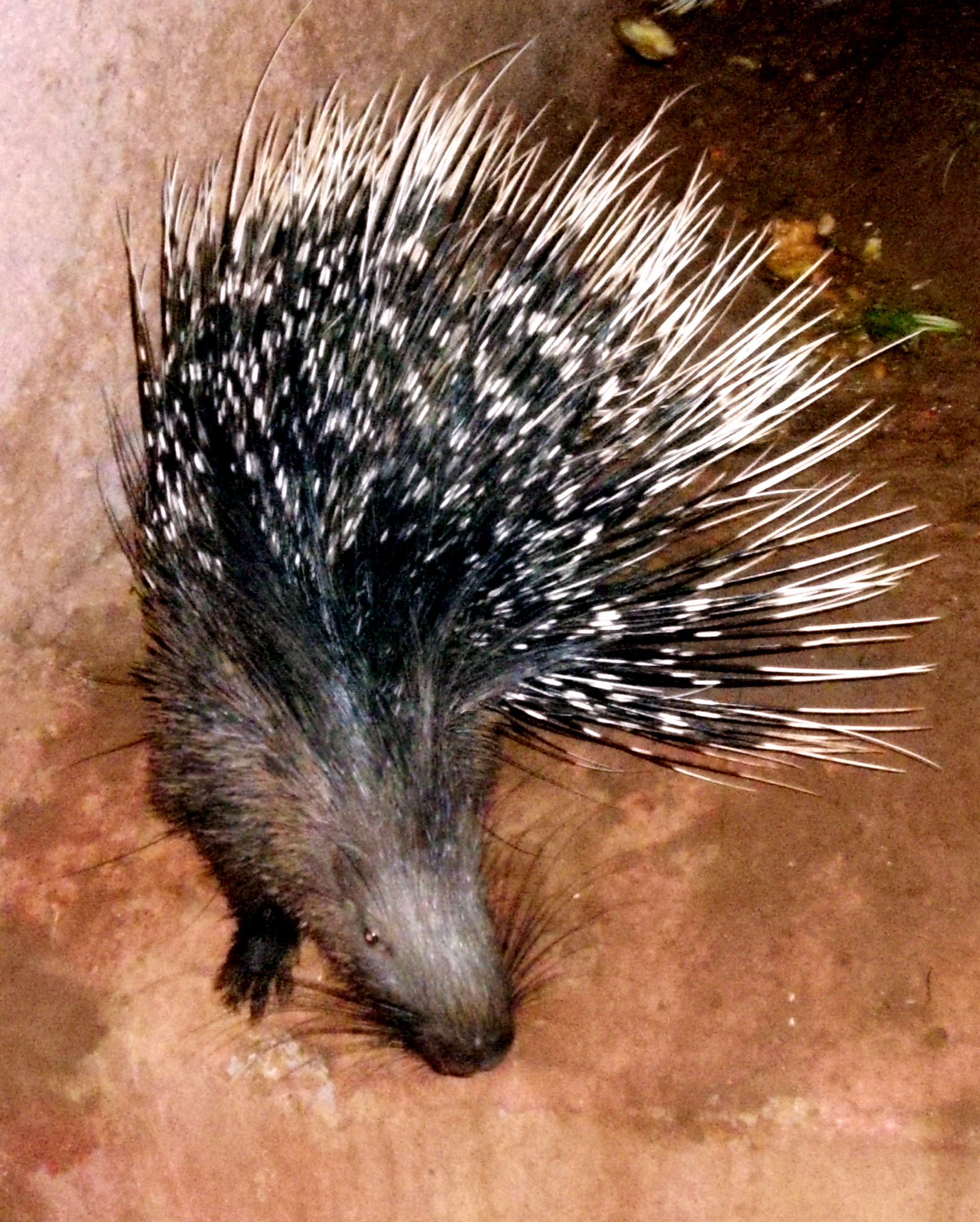
Indian porcupine

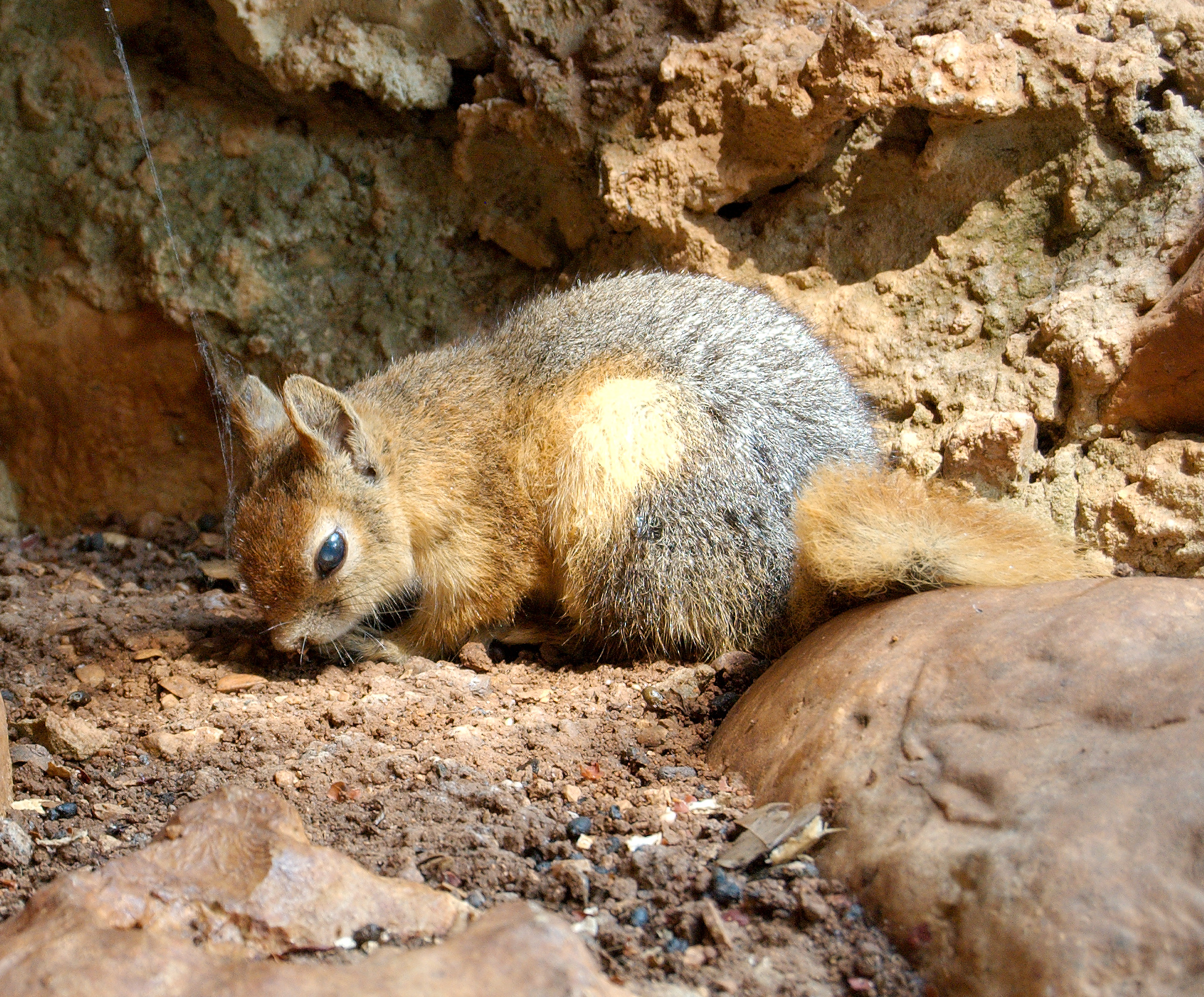
Caucasian squirrel

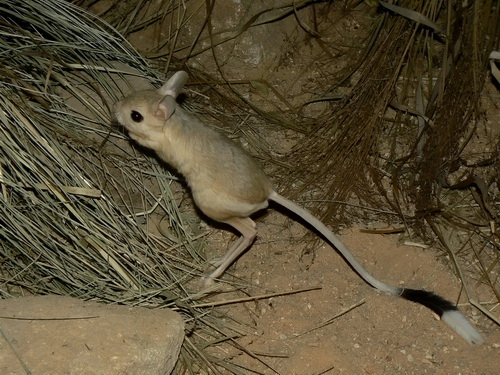
Greater Egyptian jerboa

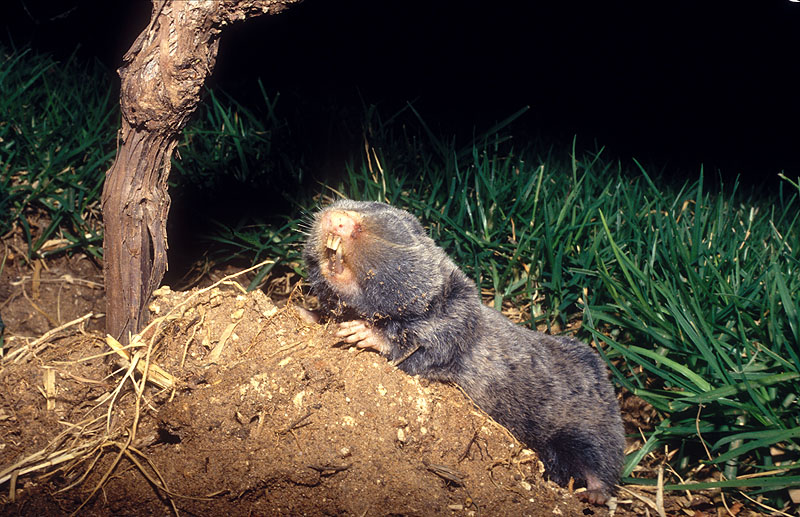
Palestine mole rat

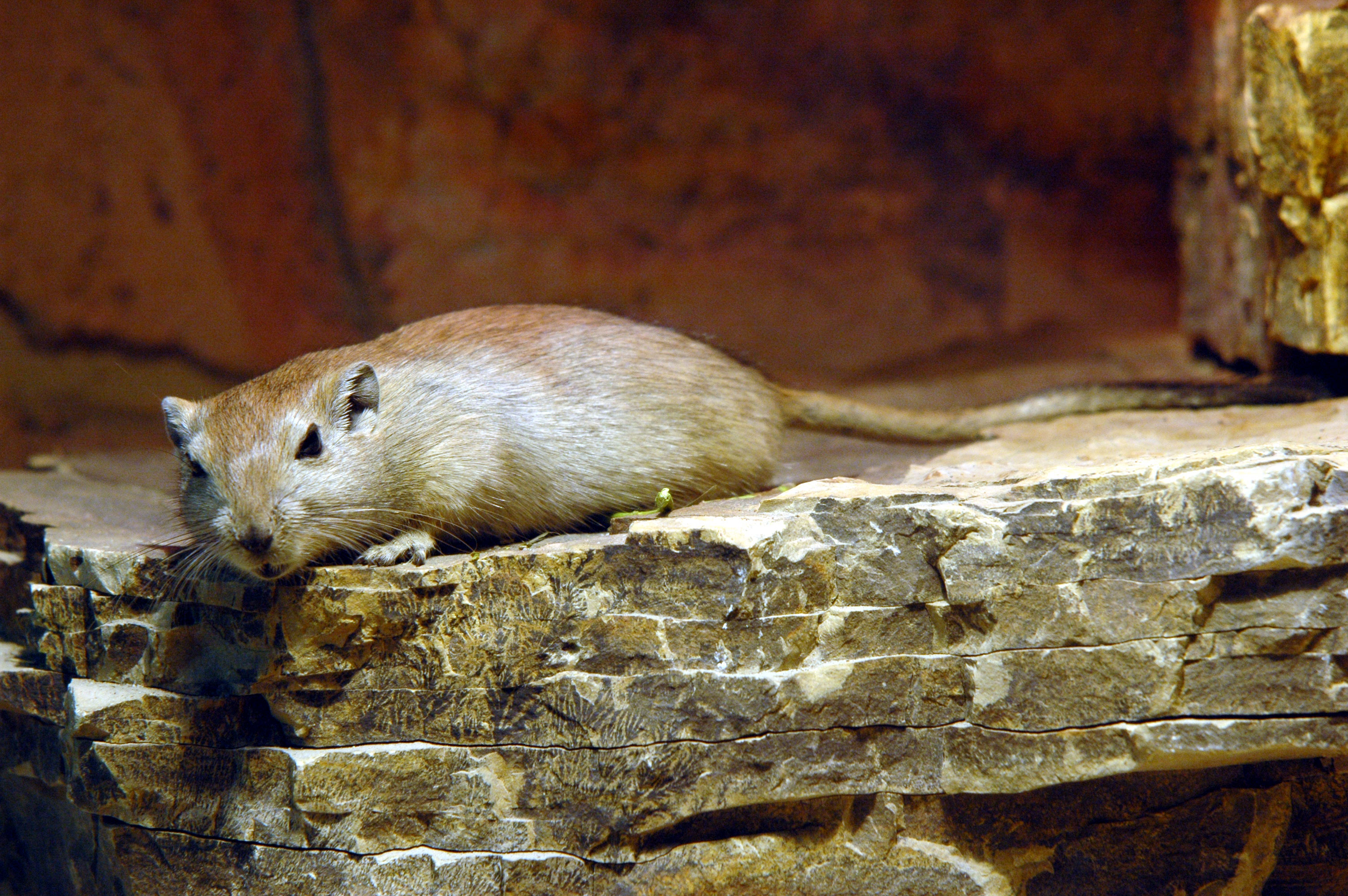
Sand rat

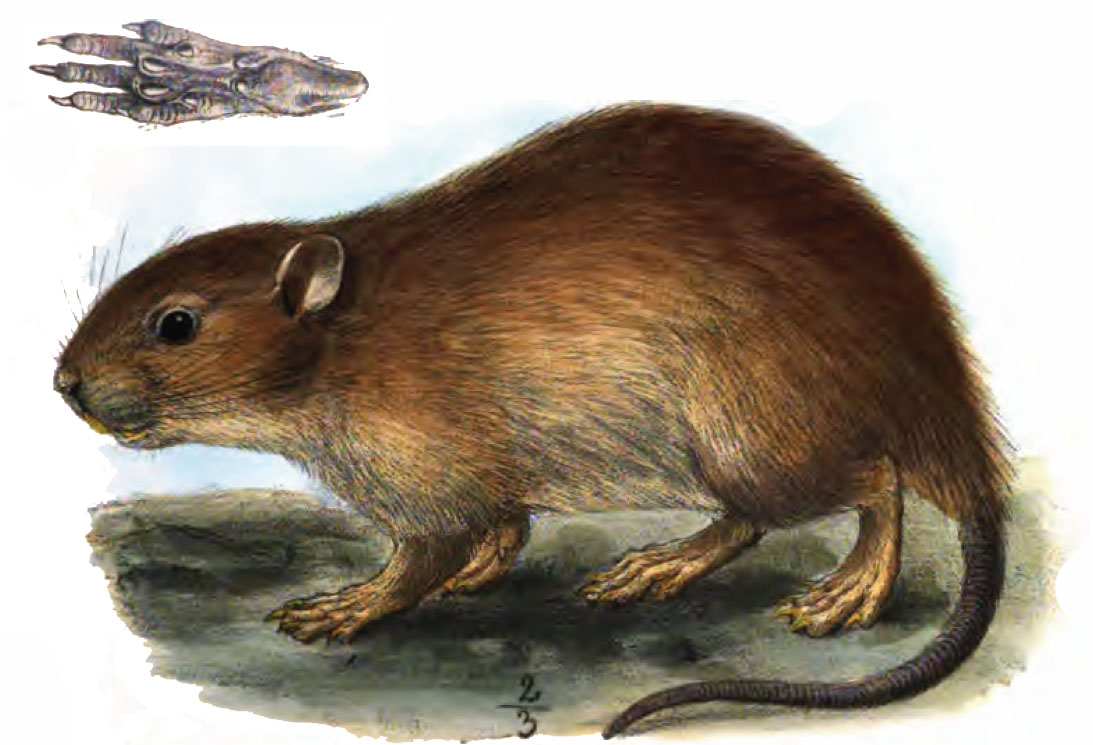
Drawing of a short-tailed bandicoot rat

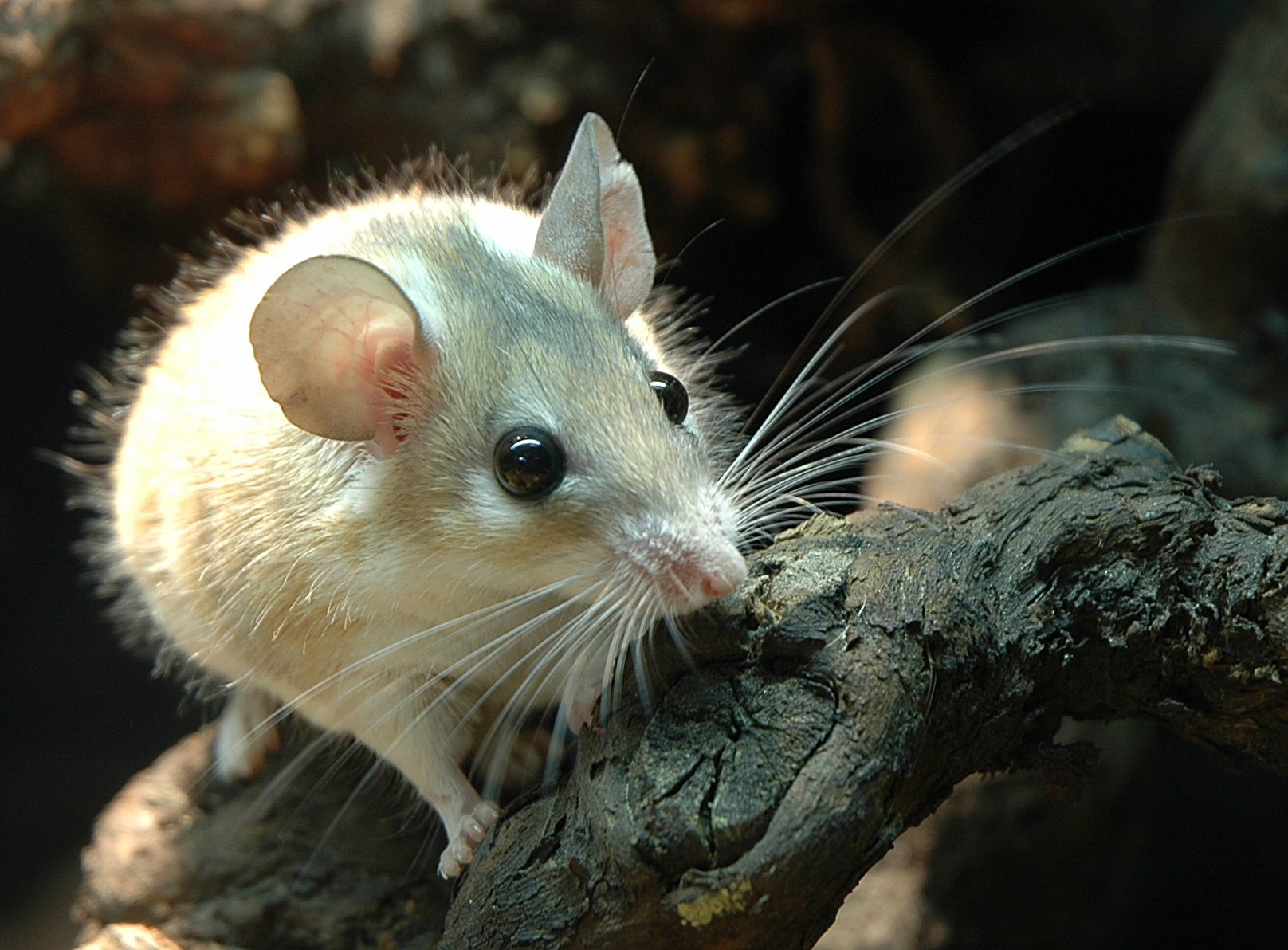
Eastern spiny mouse

Rodents make up the largest order of mammals, with over 40% of mammalian species. They have two incisors in the upper and lower jaw which grow continually and must be kept short by gnawing. Most rodents are small though the capybara can weigh up to 45 kg (99 lb).

- Suborder: Hystricognathi
  - Family: Hystricidae (Old World porcupines)
    - Genus: Hystrix
      - Indian porcupine, Hystrix indica LC
  - Family: Myocastoridae (coypu)
    - Genus: Myocastor
      - Coypu, Myocastor coypu LC (introduced)
- Suborder: Sciurognathi
  - Family: Sciuridae (squirrels)
    - Subfamily: Sciurinae
      - Genus: Sciurus
        - Caucasian squirrel, Sciurus anomalus LC
  - Family: Gliridae (dormice)
    - Subfamily: Leithiinae
      - Genus: Dryomys
        - Forest dormouse, Dryomys nidetula LC
      - Genus: Eliomys
        - Asian garden dormouse, Eliomys melanurus LC
  - Family: Dipodidae (jerboas)
    - Subfamily: Allactaginae
      - Genus: Allactaga
        - Euphrates jerboa, Allactaga euphratica NT
    - Subfamily: Dipodinae
      - Genus: Jaculus
        - Lesser Egyptian jerboa, Jaculus jaculus LC
        - Greater Egyptian jerboa, Jaculus orientalis LC
  - Family: Spalacidae (bamboo and mole rats)
    - Subfamily: Spalacinae
      - Genus: Spalax
        - Palestine mole rat, Spalax ehrenbergi LC
  - Family: Cricetidae (hamsters, voles, lemmings)
    - Subfamily: Cricetinae
    - Subfamily: Arvicolinae
      - Genus: Microtus
        - Günther's vole, Microtus guentheri LC
  - Family: Muridae (mice, rats, gerbils)
    - Subfamily: Deomyinae
    - Subfamily: Gerbillinae
      - Genus: Gerbillus
        - Anderson's gerbil, Gerbillus andersoni VU
        - Wagner's gerbil, Gerbillus dasyurus LC
        - Flower's gerbil, Gerbillus floweri LC
        - Lesser Egyptian gerbil, Gerbillus gerbillus LC
        - Pygmy gerbil, Gerbillus henleyi LC
        - Balochistan gerbil, Gerbillus nanus LC
      - Genus: Meriones
        - Sundevall's jird, Meriones crassus LC
        - Libyan jird, Meriones libycus LC
        - Buxton's jird, Meriones sacramenti VU
        - Tristram's jird, Meriones tristrami LC
      - Genus: Psammomys
        - Sand rat, Psammomys obesus LC
      - Genus: Sekeetamys
        - Bushy-tailed jird, Sekeetamys calurus LC
    - Subfamily: Murinae
      - Genus: Apodemus
        - Yellow-necked mouse, Apodemus flavicollis LC
        - Steppe field mouse, Apodemus witherbyi LC
      - Genus: Nesokia
        - Short-tailed bandicoot rat, Nesokia indica LC
      - Genus: Rattus
        - Brown rat, Rattus norvegicus LC
        - Black rat, Rattus rattus LC
      - Genus: Mus
        - Macedonian mouse, Mus macedonicus LC
        - House mouse, Mus musculus LC
    - Subfamily: Deomyinae
      - Genus: Acomys
        - Eastern spiny mouse, Acomys dimidiatus LC
        - Golden spiny mouse, Acomys russatus LC

== Order: Lagomorpha (rabbits, hares and picas) ==
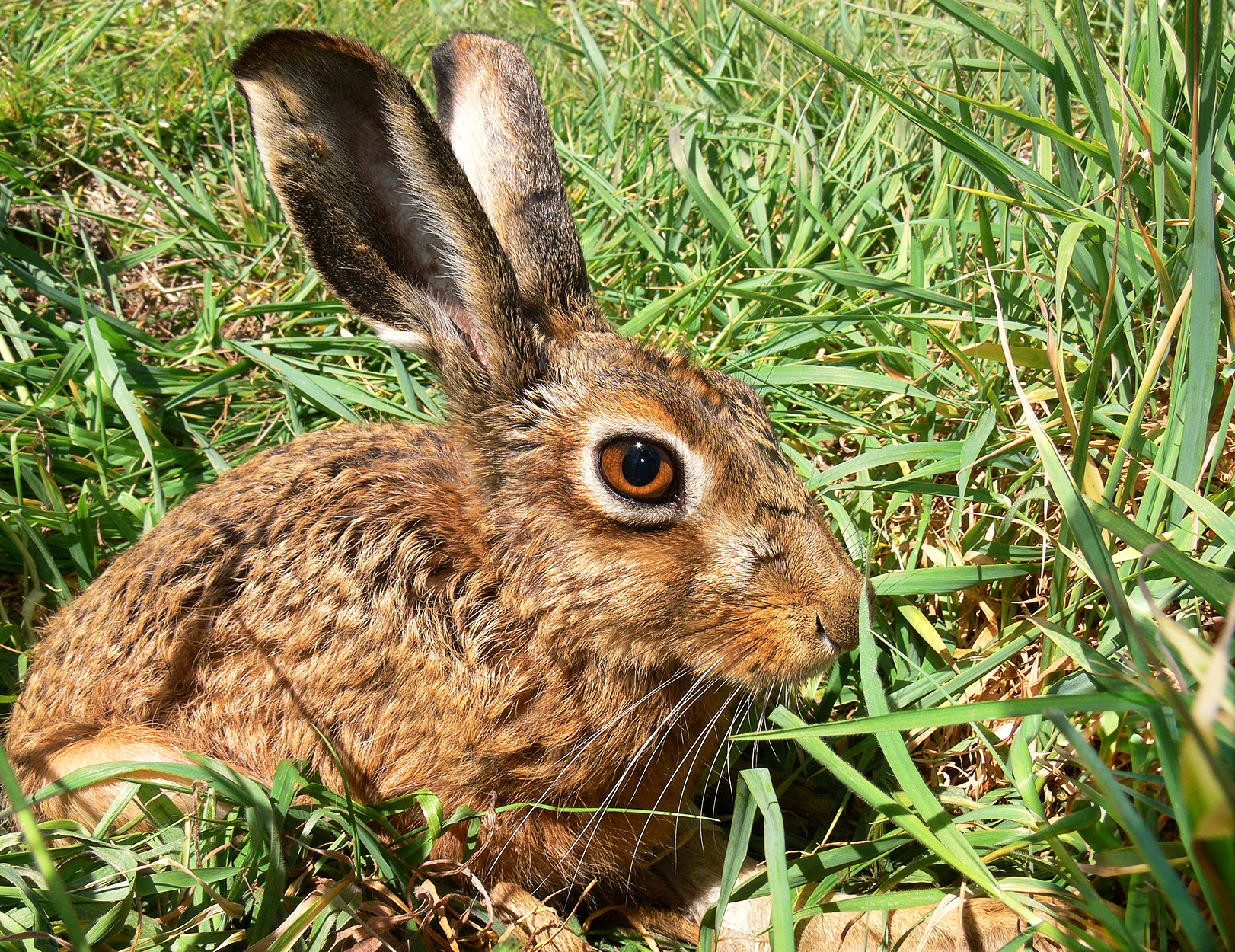
Cape hare

The lagomorphs comprise two families, Leporidae (hares and rabbits), and Ochotonidae (pikas). Though they can resemble rodents, and were classified as a superfamily in that order until the early 20th century, they have since been considered a separate order. They differ from rodents in a number of physical characteristics, such as having four incisors in the upper jaw rather than two.

- Family: Leporidae (hares and rabbits)
  - Subfamily: Leporinae
    - Genus: Lepus
      - Cape hare, Lepus capensis LC
      - European hare, Lepus europaeus LC

== Order: Erinaceomorpha (hedgehogs and gymnures) ==
The order Erinaceomorpha contains a single family, Erinaceidae, which comprise the hedgehogs and gymnures. The hedgehogs are easily recognised by their spines while gymnures look more like large rats.

- Family: Erinaceidae (hedgehogs)
  - Subfamily: Erinaceinae
    - Genus: Erinaceus
      - Southern white-breasted hedgehog, Erinaceus concolor LC
    - Genus: Hemiechinus
      - Long-eared hedgehog, Hemiechinus auritus LC
    - Genus: Paraechinus
      - Desert hedgehog, Paraechinus aethiopicus LC

== Order: Soricomorpha (shrews, moles, and solenodons) ==
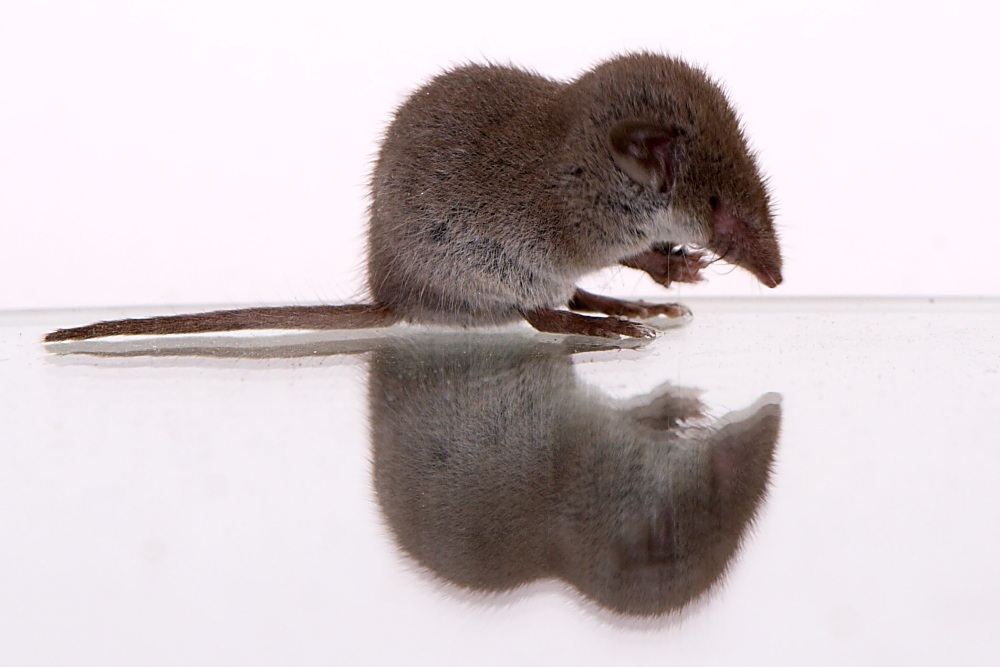
Lesser white-toothed shrew

The "shrew-forms" are insectivorous mammals. The shrews and solenodons closely resemble mice while the moles are stout bodied burrowers.

- Family: Soricidae (shrews)
  - Subfamily: Crocidurinae
    - Genus: Crocidura
      - Bicolored shrew, Crocidura leucodon LC
      - Lesser white-toothed shrew, Crocidura suaveolens LC
      - Negev shrew, Crocidura ramona LC
    - Genus: Suncus
      - Etruscan shrew, Suncus etruscus LC

== Order: Chiroptera (bats) ==
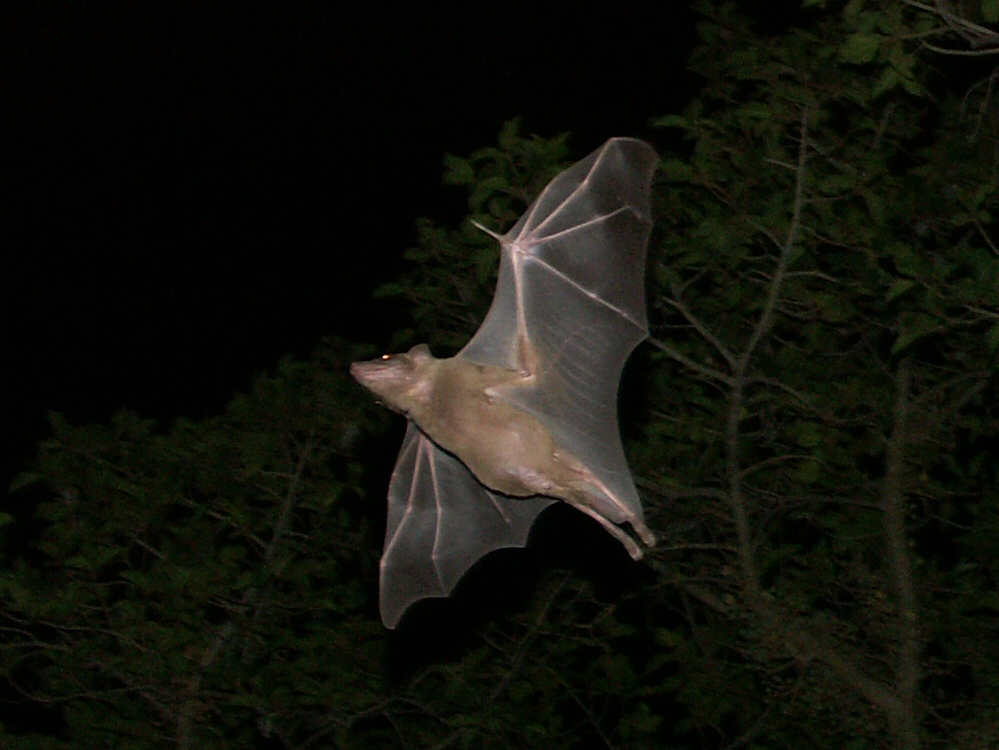
Egyptian fruit bat

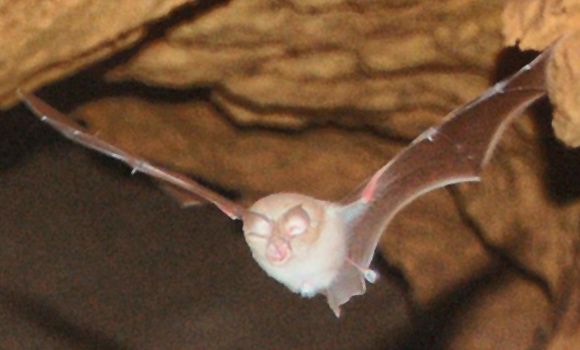
Mediterranean horseshoe bat

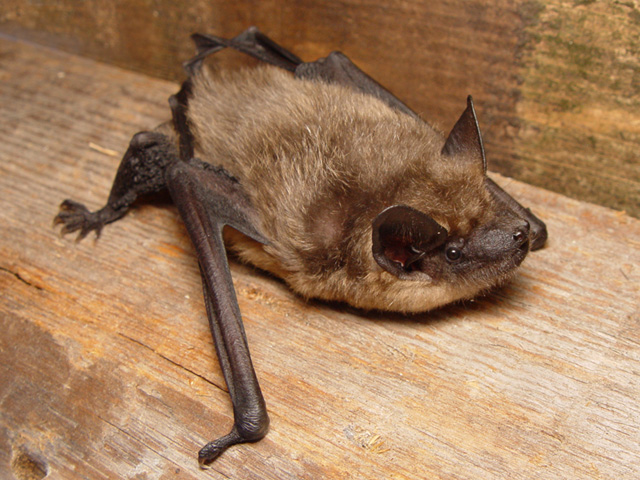
Serotine bat

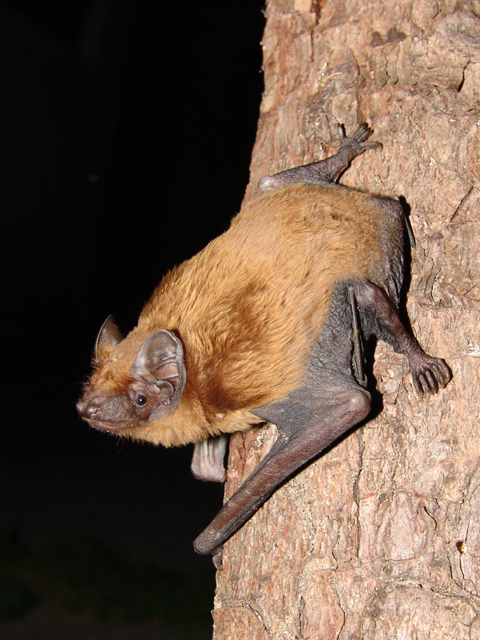
Common noctule

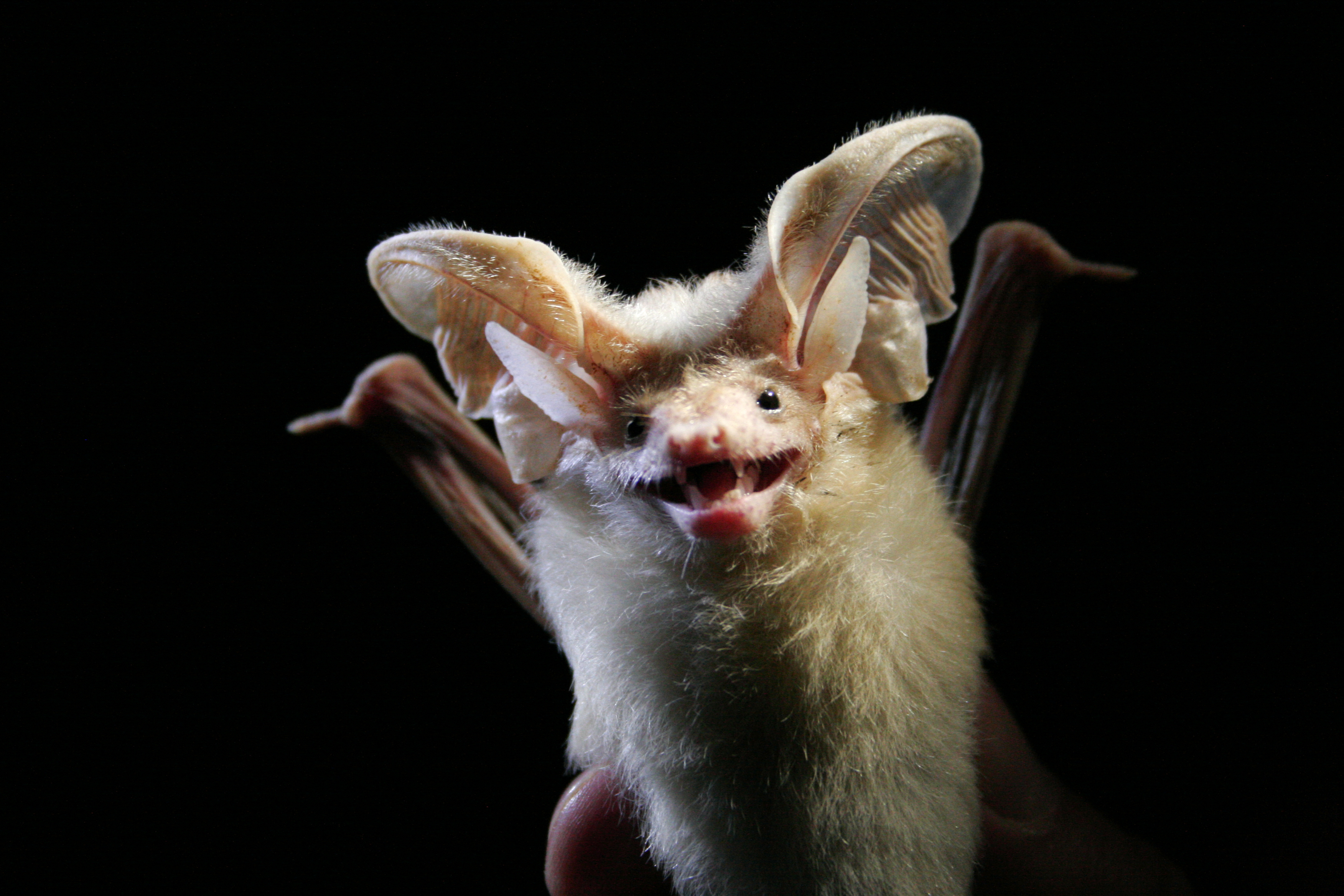
Desert long-eared bat

The bats' most distinguishing feature is that their forelimbs are developed as wings, making them the only mammals capable of flight. Bat species account for about 20% of all mammals.

- Suborder: Megachiroptera
  - Family: Pteropodidae (flying foxes, Old World fruit bats)
    - Genus: Rousettus
      - Egyptian fruit bat, Rousettus aegyptiacus LC
- Suborder: Microchiroptera
  - Family: Emballonuridae (sac-winged bats)
    - Genus: Taphozous
      - Naked-rumped tomb bat, Taphozous nudiventris LC
      - Egyptian tomb bat, Taphozous perforatus LC
  - Family: Hipposideridae (Old World leaf-nosed bats)
    - Genus: Asellia
      - Trident bat, Asellia tridens LC
  - Family: Molossidae (free-tailed bats)
    - Genus: Tadarida
      - European free-tailed bat, Tadarida teniotis LC
  - Family: Nycteridae (slit-faced bats)
    - Genus: Nycteris
      - Egyptian slit-faced bat, Nycteris thebaica LC
  - Family: Rhinolophidae (horseshoe bats)
    - Genus: Rhinolophus
      - Blasius's horseshoe bat, Rhinolophus blasii LC
      - Geoffroy's horseshoe bat, Rhinolophus clivosus LC
      - Mediterranean horseshoe bat, Rhinolophus euryale NT
      - Greater horseshoe bat, Rhinolophus ferrumequinum LC
      - Lesser horseshoe bat, Rhinolophus hipposideros LC
      - Mehely's horseshoe bat, Rhinolophus mehelyi VU
  - Family: Rhinopomatidae (mouse-tailed bats)
    - Genus: Rhinopoma
      - Lesser mouse-tailed bat, Rhinopoma hardwickei LC
      - Greater mouse-tailed bat, Rhinopoma microphyllum LC
  - Family: Vespertilionidae (vesper bats)
    - Genus: Eptesicus
      - Botta's serotine, Eptesicus bottae LC
      - Serotine bat, Eptesicus serotinus LC
    - Genus: Hypsugo
      - Desert pipistrelle, Hypsugo ariel DD
    - Genus: Miniopterus
      - Common bent-wing bat, Miniopterus schreibersii CD
    - Genus: Myotis
      - Lesser mouse-eared bat, Myotis blythii LC
      - Long-fingered bat, Myotis capaccinii VU
      - Geoffroy's bat, Myotis emarginatus LC
      - Natterer's bat, Myotis nattereri LC
    - Genus: Nyctalus
      - Common noctule, Nyctalus noctula LC
    - Genus: Otonycteris
      - Desert long-eared bat, Otonycteris hemprichii LR/LC
    - Genus: Pipistrellus
      - Kuhl's pipistrelle, Pipistrellus kuhli LC
      - Rüppell's pipistrelle, Pipistrellus rueppellii LC

== Order: Cetacea (whales) ==
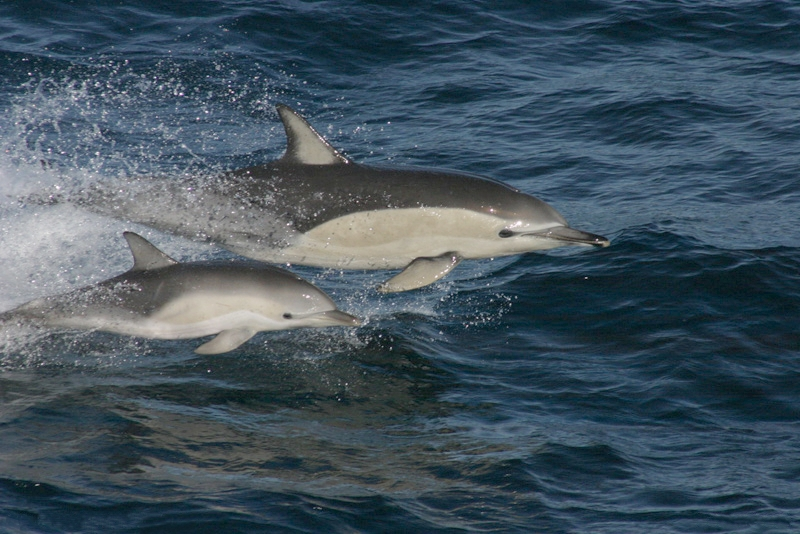
Short-beaked common dolphin with calf

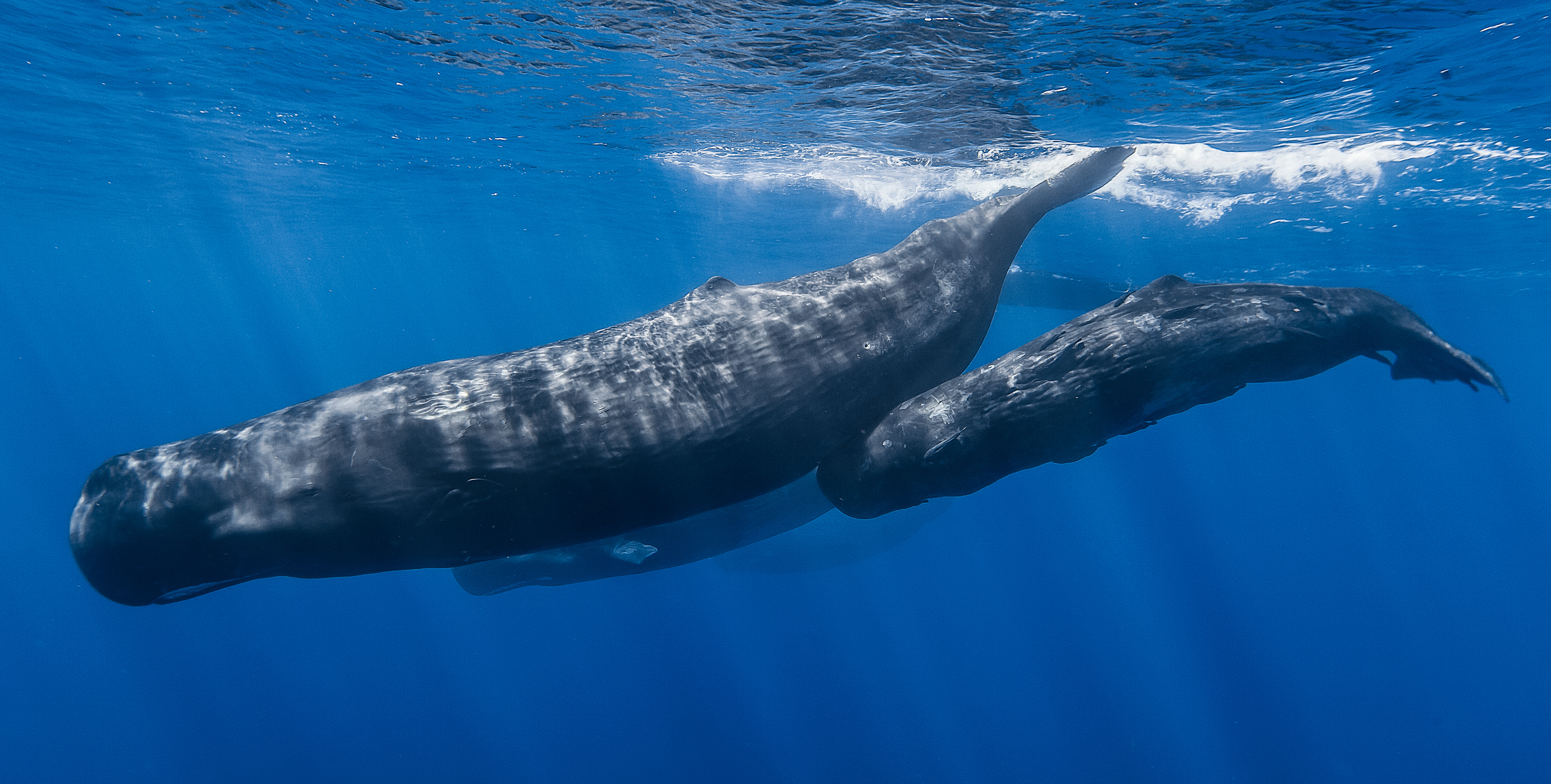
Sperm whale group

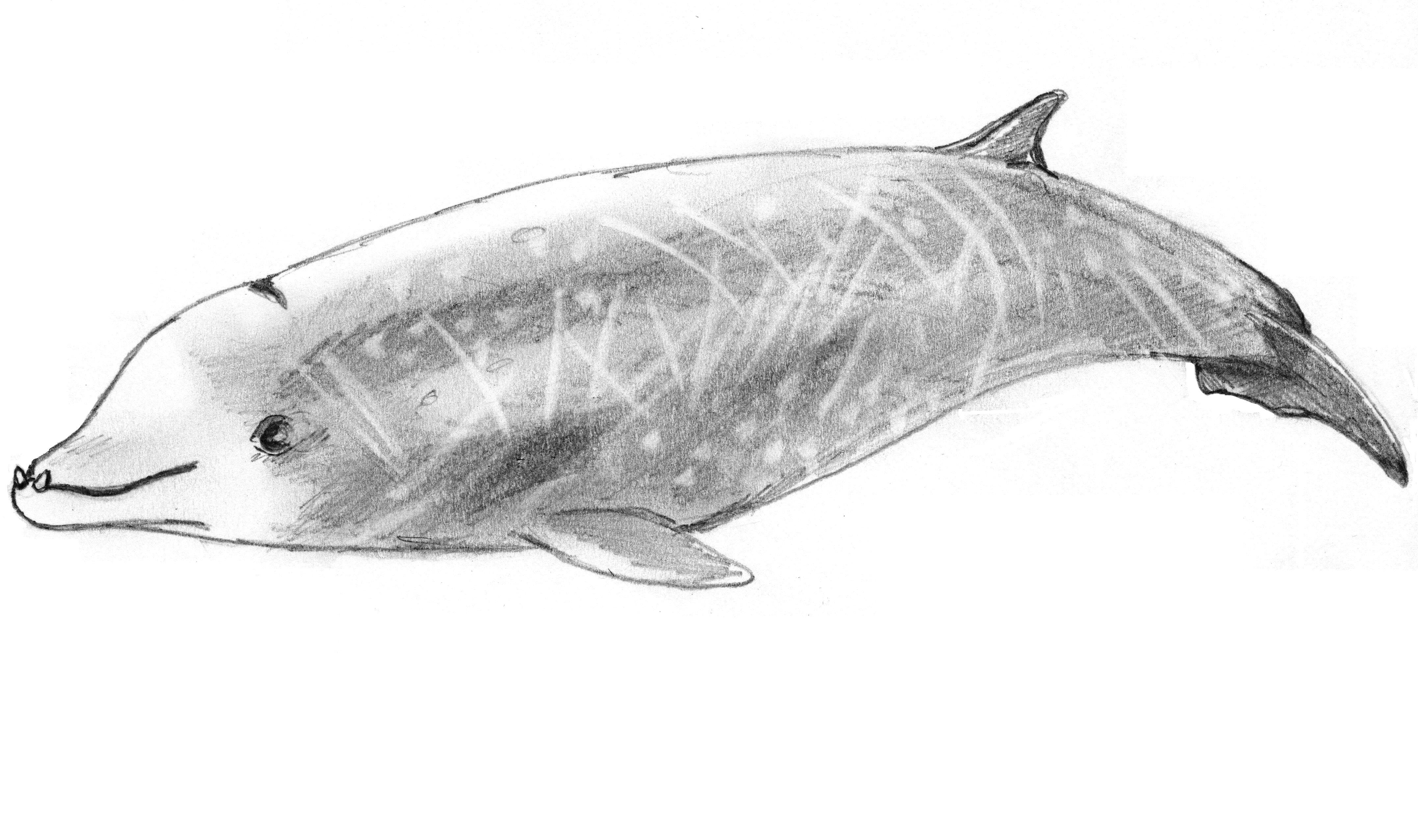
Cuvier's beaked whale

The order Cetacea includes whales, dolphins and porpoises. They are the mammals most fully adapted to aquatic life with a spindle-shaped nearly hairless body, protected by a thick layer of blubber, and forelimbs and tail modified to provide propulsion underwater.

Species listed below also includes species being recorded in Levantine Sea.

- Suborder: Mysticeti
  - Family: Balaenopteridae
    - Genus: Balaenoptera
      - Fin whale, Balaenoptera physalus EN
      - Common minke whale, Balaenoptera acutorostrata LC
- Subfamily: Megapterinae
  - Genus: Megaptera
    - Humpback whale, Megaptera novaeangliae LC
- Suborder: Odontoceti
  - Family: Physeteridae (sperm whales)
    - Genus: Physeter
      - Sperm whale, Physeter macrocephalus VU
  - Family: Ziphiidae (beaked whales)
    - Genus: Hyperoodon
      - Northern bottlenose whale, Hyperoodon ampullatus LC
    - Genus: Mesoplodon
      - Blainville's beaked whale, Mesoplodon densirostris DD
    - Genus: Ziphius
      - Cuvier's beaked whale, Ziphius cavirostris LC
    - Genus: Mesoplodon
      - Gervais' beaked whale, Ziphius cavirostris DD
  - Family: Delphinidae (oceanic dolphins)
    - Genus: Delphinus
      - Short-beaked common dolphin, Delphinus delphis LC
    - Genus: Grampus
      - Risso's dolphin, Grampus griseus LC
    - Genus: Pseudorca
      - False killer whale, Pseudorca crassidens DD
    - Genus: Stenella
      - Striped dolphin, Stenella coeruleoalba LC
        - Pantropical spotted dolphin, Stenella attenuata
      - Genus: Sousa
        - Sousa chinensis DD
    - Genus: Steno
      - Rough-toothed dolphin, Steno bredanensis LC
    - Genus: Tursiops
      - Common bottlenose dolphin, Tursiops truncatus LC
      - Genus: Grampus
        - Risso's dolphin, Grampus griseus LC
      - Genus: Orcinus
        - Orca, Orcinus orca DD
      - Genus: Pseudorca
        - False killer whale, Pseudorca crassidens DD
      - Genus: Globicephala
        - Long-finned pilot whale, Globicephala melas DD

== Order: Carnivora (carnivorans) ==
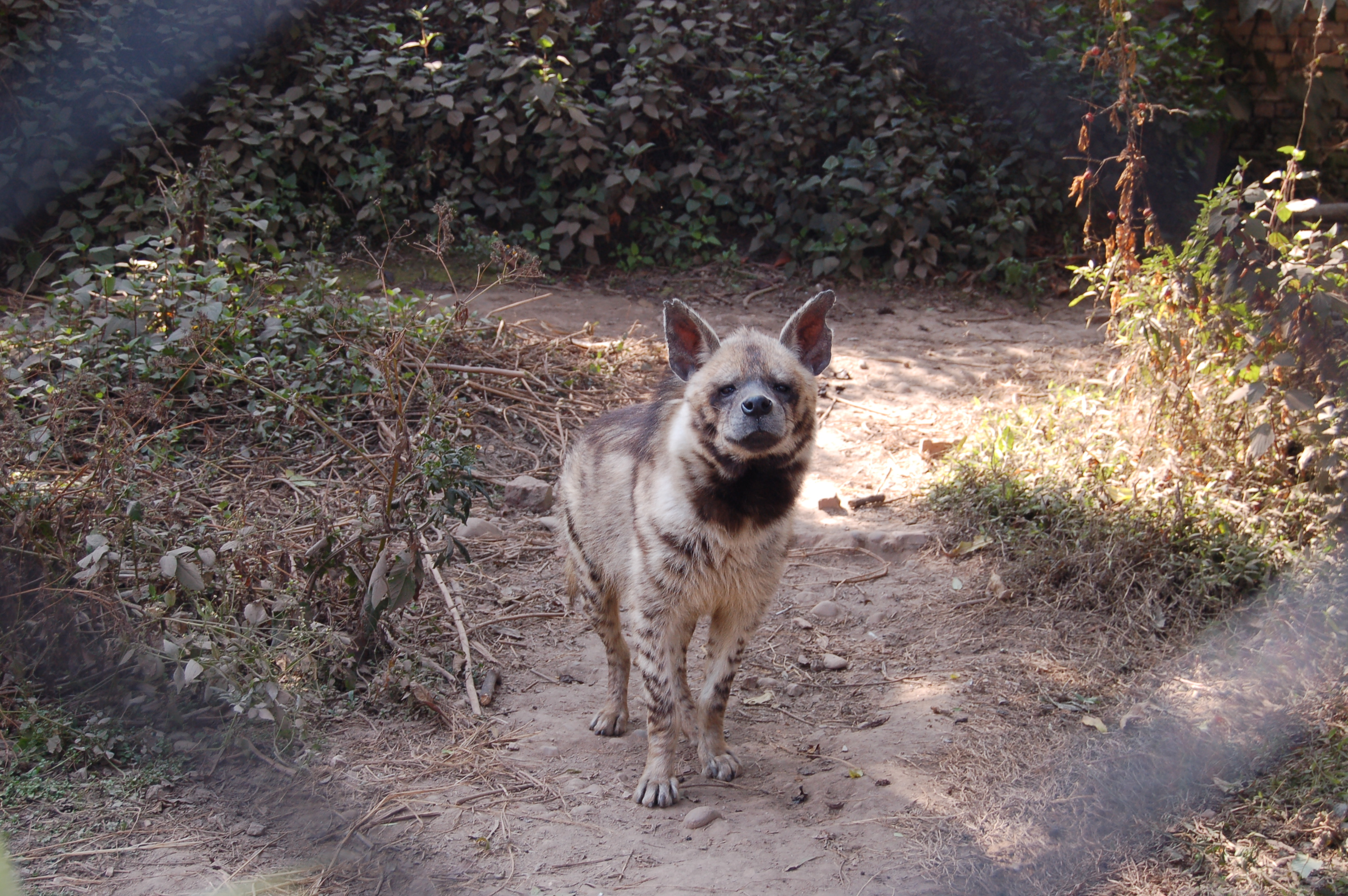
Striped hyena

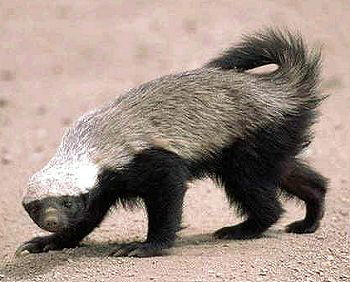
Honey badger

There are over 260 species of carnivorans, the majority of which feed primarily on meat. They have a characteristic skull shape and dentition.

- Suborder: Feliformia
  - Family: Felidae (cats)
    - Genus: Caracal
      - Caracal, C. caracal LC
    - Genus: Felis
      - Jungle cat, F. chaus LC
      - African wildcat, F. lybica LC
  - Family: Herpestidae (mongooses)
    - Genus: Herpestes
      - Egyptian mongoose, H. ichneumon LC
  - Family: Hyaenidae (hyaenas)
    - Genus: Hyaena
      - Striped hyena, H. hyaena NT
- Suborder: Caniformia
  - Family: Canidae (dogs, foxes)
    - Genus: Canis
      - Golden jackal, C. aureus LC
        - Persian jackal, C. a. aureus
        - Syrian jackal, C. a. syriacus
      - Gray wolf, C. lupus LC
        - Arabian wolf, C. l. arabs
        - Indian wolf, C. l. pallipes
    - Genus: Vulpes
      - Blanford's fox, V. cana LC
      - Rüppell's fox, V. rueppellii LC
      - Red fox, V. vulpes LC
  - Family: Mustelidae (mustelids)
    - Genus: Martes
      - Beech marten, M. foina LC
    - Genus: Meles
      - Caucasian badger, M. canescens NE
    - Genus: Mellivora
      - Honey badger, M. capensis LC
    - Genus: Vormela
      - Marbled polecat, V. peregusna VU
- Suborder: Pinnipedia
  - Family: Phocidae (earless seals)
    - Genus: Monachus
      - Mediterranean monk seal, M. monachus EN

== Order: Artiodactyla (even-toed ungulates) ==
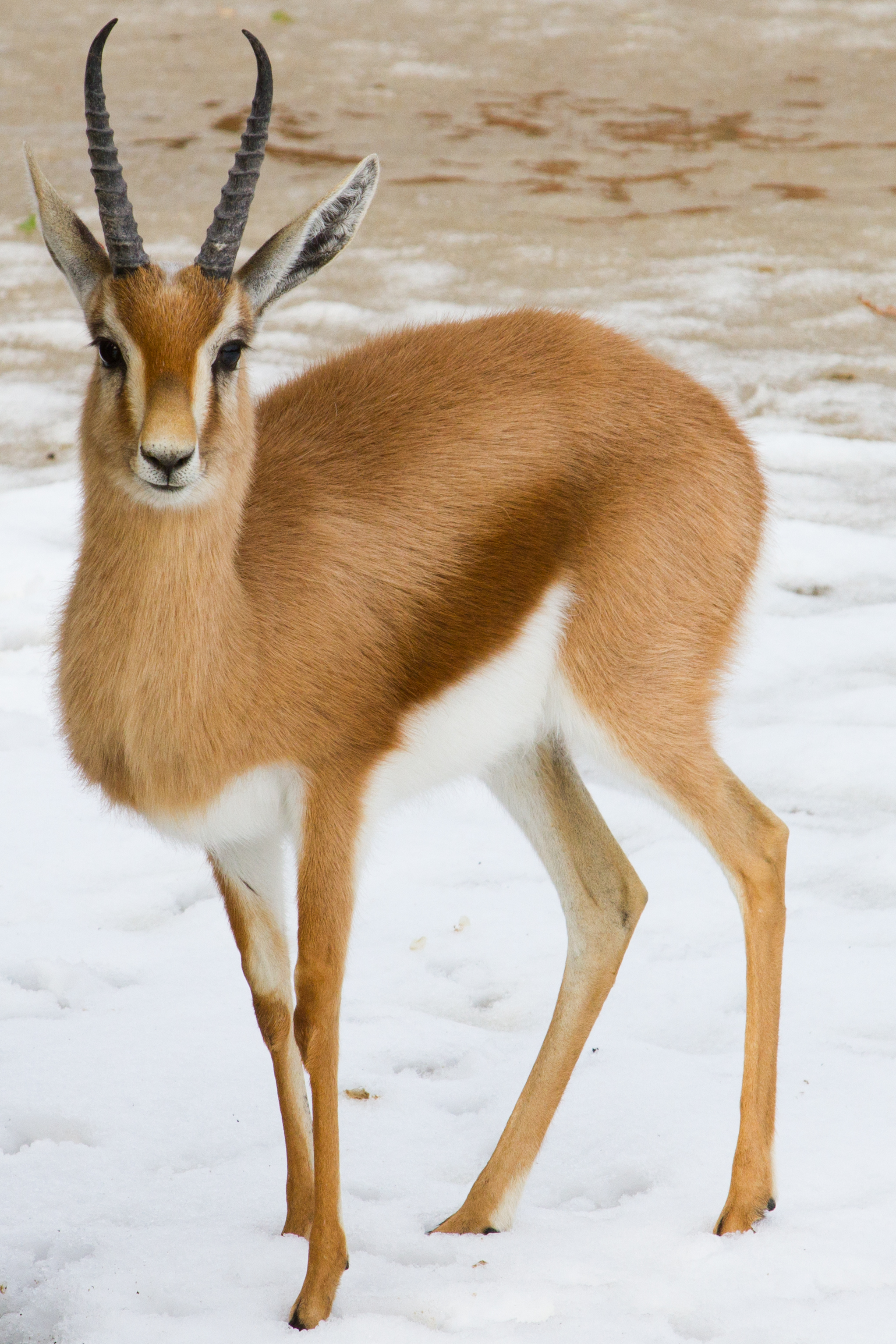
Dorcas gazelle

The even-toed ungulates are ungulates whose weight is borne about equally by the third and fourth toes, rather than mostly or entirely by the third as in perissodactyls. There are about 220 artiodactyl species, including many that are of great economic importance to humans.

- Family: Suidae (pigs)
  - Subfamily: Suinae
    - Genus: Sus
      - Wild boar, S. scrofa LC
- Family: Bovidae (cattle, antelopes, goats)
  - Subfamily: Antilopinae
    - Genus: Gazella
      - Arabian gazelle, G. arabica VU
      - Dorcas gazelle, G. dorcas VU
  - Subfamily: Caprinae
    - Genus: Capra
      - Nubian ibex, C. nubiana VU

== Locally extinct ==
The following species are locally extinct in Palestine:

- Cheetah, Acinonyx jubatus
- Addax, Addax nasomaculatus
- Hartebeest, Alcelaphus buselaphus
- Roe deer, Capreolus capreolus
- Red deer, Cervus elaphus
- Persian fallow deer, Dama mesopotamica
- Onager, Equus hemionus
- Sand cat, Felis margarita
- Arabian oryx, Oryx leucoryx
- Lion, Panthera leo
- Leopard, Panthera pardus
- Brown bear, Ursus arctos

== See also ==
- List of chordate orders
- Lists of mammals by region
- List of prehistoric mammals
- Mammal classification
- List of mammals described in the 2000s
