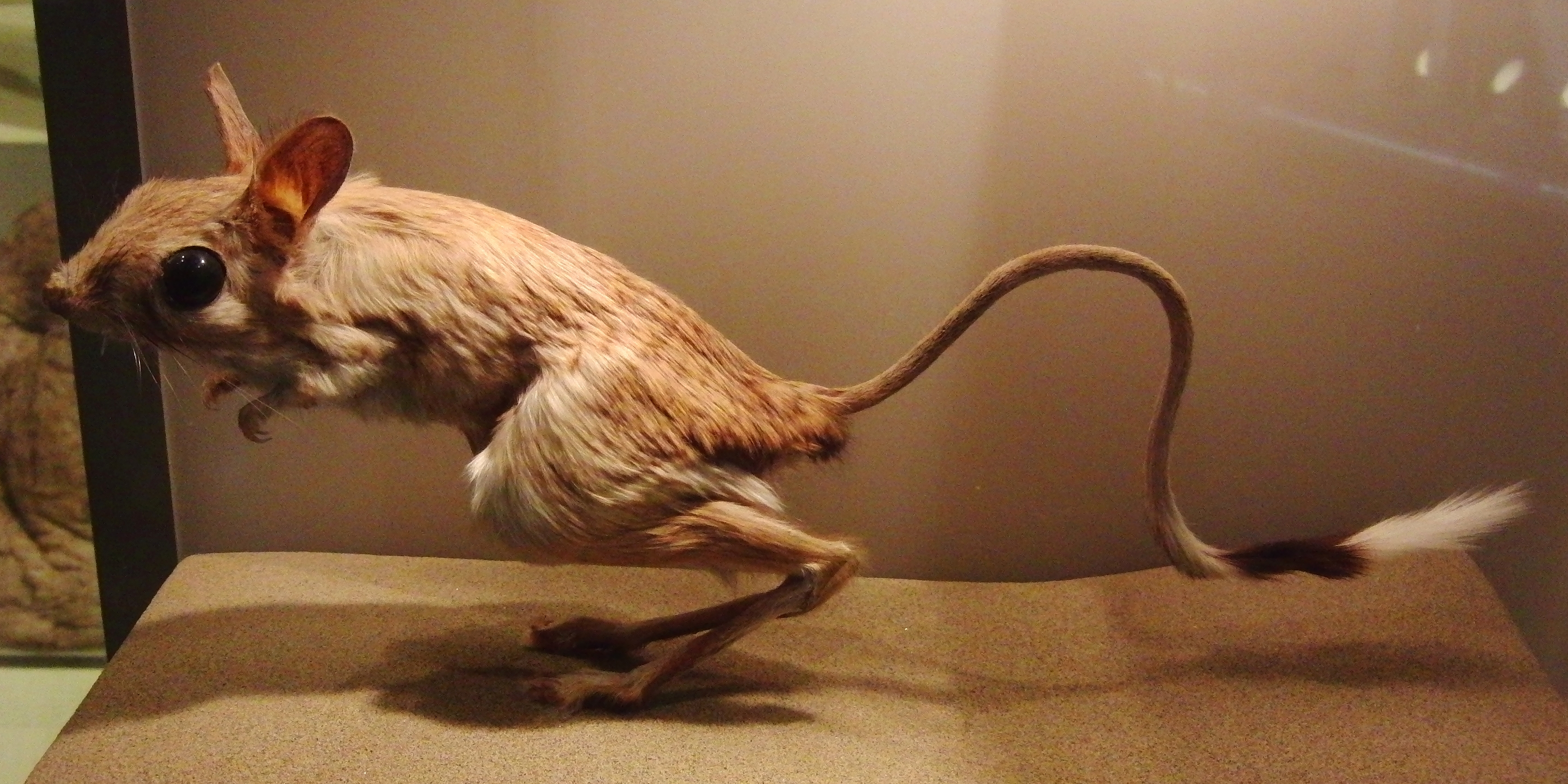
- Jaculus orientalis

Scientific classification
- Domain: Eukaryota
- Kingdom: Animalia
- Phylum: Chordata
- Class: Mammalia
- Order: Rodentia
- Family: Dipodidae
- Subfamily: Dipodinae
- Tribe: Dipodini
- Genus: Jaculus; Erxleben, 1777

Type species
- Mus jaculus Linnaeus, 1758

Species
- Jaculus blanfordi Jaculus jaculus Jaculus orientalis

= Jaculus (rodent) =

Jaculus Temporal range: Middle Miocene - Recent

Genus of rodents

The genus Jaculus is a member of the Dipodinae subfamily of dipodoid rodents (jerboas). Jaculus species are distributed in desert and semi-arid regions across northern Africa, the Sahara, the Horn of Africa, Arabia, the Middle East, and Central Asia.

Collectively, the species within the genus may be commonly referred to as "desert jerboas", although this more particularly applied to the lesser Egyptian jerboa (Jaculus jaculus).

== Species ==
The following species are recognised for the genus Jaculus:

- Blanford's jerboa, Jaculus blanfordi
- Lesser Egyptian jerboa, Jaculus jaculus
- Greater Egyptian jerboa, Jaculus orientalis
- Thaler's jerboa Jaculus thaleri
- African hammada jerboa Jaculus hirtipes

== Sources ==
- Holden, M. E. and G. G. Musser. 2005. Family Dipodidae. pp. 871–893 in Mammal Species of the World a Taxonomic and Geographic Reference. D. E. Wilson and D. M. Reeder eds. Johns Hopkins University Press, Baltimore.
- Myers, P.; R. Espinosa; C. S. Parr; T. Jones; G. S. Hammond; T. A. Dewey (2006). "Genus Jaculus". The Animal Diversity Web (online). The Regents of the University of Michigan.
