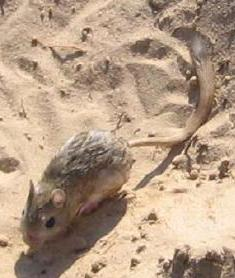
- Stylodipus telum

Scientific classification
- Domain: Eukaryota
- Kingdom: Animalia
- Phylum: Chordata
- Class: Mammalia
- Order: Rodentia
- Family: Dipodidae
- Subfamily: Dipodinae
- Tribe: Dipodini
- Genus: Stylodipus; G. M. Allen, 1925

Type species
- Stylodipus andrewsi J. A. Allen, 1925

Species
- Stylodipus andrewsi Stylodipus sungorus Stylodipus telum

= Stylodipus =

Stylodipus Temporal range: Late Pleistocene - Recent

Genus of rodents

Stylodipus is a genus of rodent in the family Dipodidae. It contains the following species:

- Andrews's three-toed jerboa (Stylodipus andrewsi)
- Mongolian three-toed jerboa (Stylodipus sungorus)
- Thick-tailed three-toed jerboa (Stylodipus telum)
