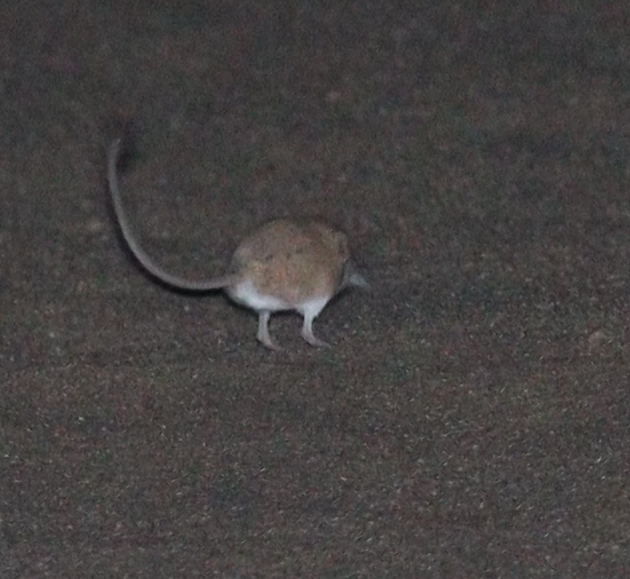

Conservation status
- Least Concern (IUCN 3.1)

Scientific classification
- Kingdom: Animalia
- Phylum: Chordata
- Class: Mammalia
- Order: Rodentia
- Family: Dipodidae
- Genus: Stylodipus
- Species: S. andrewsi

Binomial name
- Stylodipus andrewsi G. M. Allen, 1925

= Andrews's three-toed jerboa =

Species of rodent

Andrews's three-toed jerboa, or the Mongolian jerboa, (Stylodipus andrewsi) is a species of rodent in the family Dipodidae. It is found in China (Inner Mongolia, Gansu, and Ningxia provinces) and Mongolia.

== Description ==
Andrews's three-toed jerboa grows to a length of 113 to 130 mm (4.4 to 5.1 in) with a tail rather longer than its body and a weight of about 60 grams (2.1 oz). The crown of the head is grey with white spots above the eye and another behind the ear. The rest of the coat is buffish grey. A white band stretches across the hips and the underparts are white. The central toe on the hind foot is the longest and the sole of the foot is haired. The tail is thickened by the adipose tissue beneath the skin and has a flattened, terminal, black bushy section. It can be distinguished from the rather similar thick-tailed three-toed jerboa (Stylodipus telum) by the fact that it has premolars in the upper jaw, these being vestigial in S. telum.

== Behaviour ==
Andrews's three-toed jerboa is nocturnal and is a solitary animal. It inhabits semi-arid and arid steppes and grassland, as well as sand dunes with scrubby vegetation. It is also found in coniferous and mixed forests with undergrowth. It feeds on green parts of plants, roots and seeds. Females usually have a single litter consisting of two to four young in the year.

== Status ==
Andrews's three-toed jerboa has a wide range and presumed large total population and occurs in a number of protected areas. No particular threats to this species have been identified and Its population trend is unknown. The International Union for Conservation of Nature has assessed its conservation status as being of "least concern".
