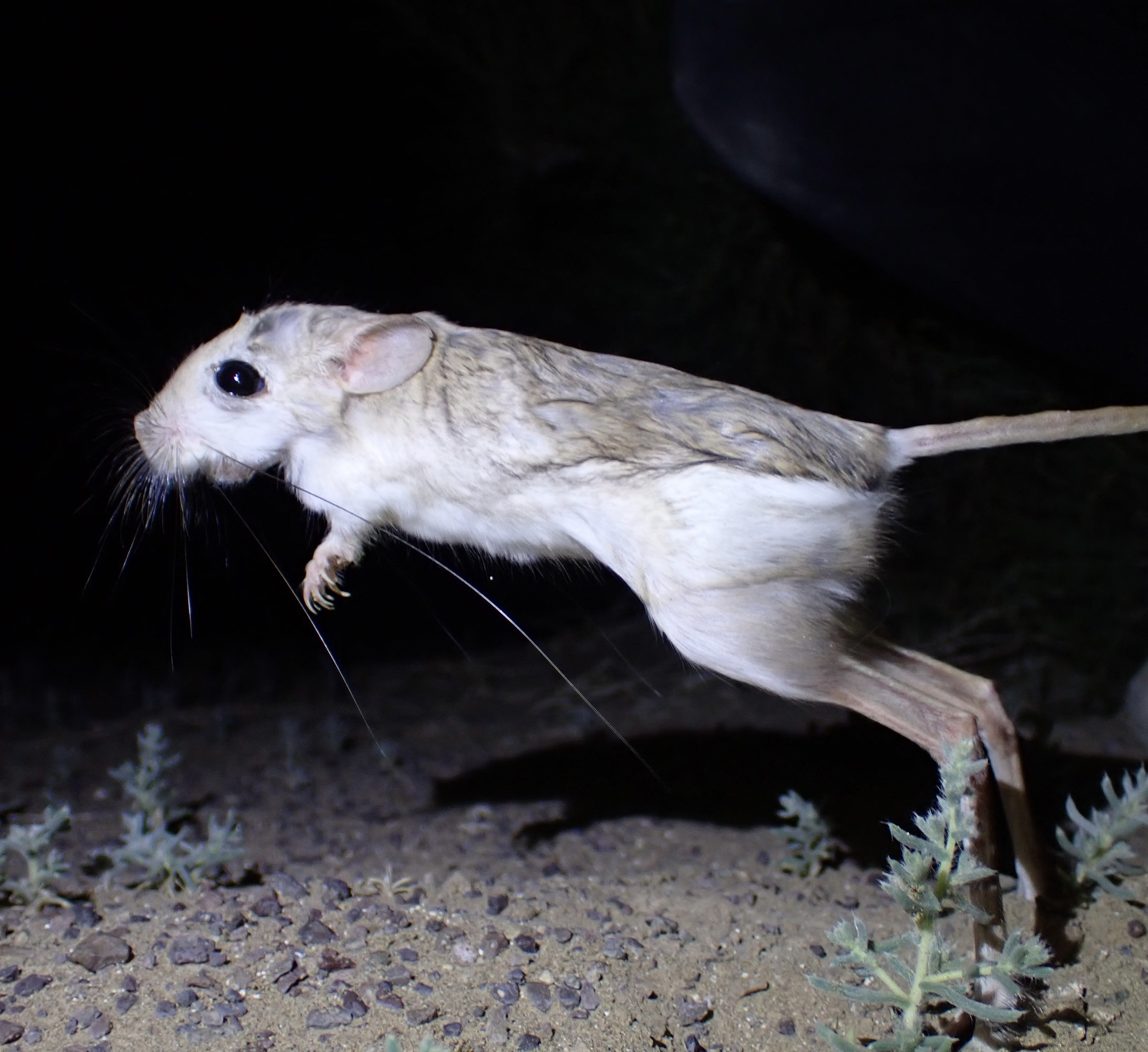

Conservation status
- Least Concern (IUCN 3.1)

Scientific classification
- Kingdom: Animalia
- Phylum: Chordata
- Class: Mammalia
- Order: Rodentia
- Family: Dipodidae
- Genus: Jaculus
- Species: J. blanfordi

Binomial name
- Jaculus blanfordi (Murray, 1884)

Synonyms
- Dipus blanfordi Murray, 1884; Jaculus turcmenicus Vinogradov & Bondar, 1949

= Blanford's jerboa =

Blanford's jerboa Jaculus blanfordi

Species of rodent

Blanford's jerboa (Jaculus blanfordi) is a species of rodent in the family Dipodidae. It is native to Central Asia and is found in Turkmenistan, Uzbekistan, Afghanistan, Iran and Pakistan.

== Taxonomy ==
Blanford's jerboa was first described in 1884 by the British zoologist James Albert Murray, curator of the Karachi Museum and author of a number of books on the birds and mammals of the Indian subcontinent. He named it "Jaculus blanfordi" in honour of the British geologist and zoologist William Thomas Blanford who was a member of the Indian Geological Survey and later published works on the fauna of India.

== Distribution and habitat ==
Blanford's jerboa is native to Central Asia. Its range extends from Turkmenistan and Iran, through the Kyzyl Kum Desert and Karakum Desert to central Uzbekistan, Afghanistan and southwestern Pakistan. Its typical habitat is bare clayey or gravelly areas in deserts and other arid localities, but not sandy areas with dunes.

== Behaviour ==
Blanford's jerboa is a solitary rodent and digs long tunnels in hard ground in which to live. It uses its incisors to loosen the soil, its fore-limbs for digging and pushing loose material under its body, its hind limbs to kick the soil backwards and its snout to ram loose soil. The tunnels are of three types; temporary short burrows with several entrances, several tunnels and a single chamber; breeding burrows with more and longer tunnels, more numerous entrances and a nest chamber at least 30 cm (12 in) below ground level; winter burrows with a single long tunnel, usually horizontal but with the single chamber some way beneath the ground surface. This jerboa feeds on seeds and such desert plants as Artemisia aucheri, Anabasis aphylla and Peganum harmala, and pieces of stem and leaf have been found inside burrows.

== Status ==
Blanford's jerboa has a wide range and is presumed to have a large total population. In some areas, such as Turkmenistan and Uzbekistan, the species is thought to be in decline as some of its habitat is brought under cultivation. However, any decline in total population is small and the International Union for Conservation of Nature has assessed its conservation status as being of "least concern".
