= Mongolian three-toed jerboa =

Conservation status
- Least Concern (IUCN 3.1)

Scientific classification
- Kingdom: Animalia
- Phylum: Chordata
- Class: Mammalia
- Order: Rodentia
- Family: Dipodidae
- Genus: Stylodipus
- Species: S. sungorus

Binomial name
- Stylodipus sungorus Sokolov & Shenbrot, 1987

Species of rodent

The Mongolian three-toed jerboa (Stylodipus sungorus) is a species of rodent in the family Dipodidae. It is found in Mongolia and possibly China.
