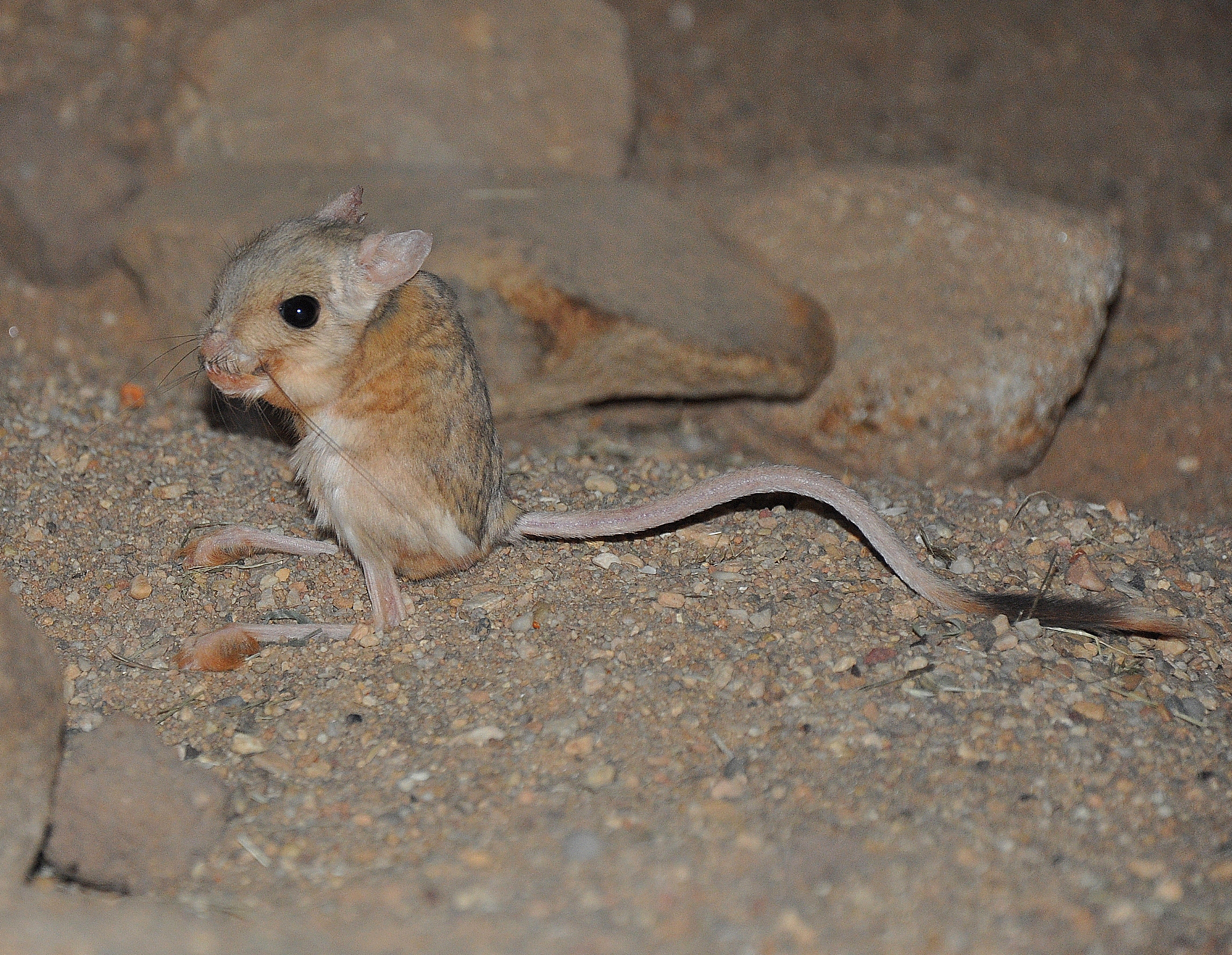

Conservation status
- Least Concern (IUCN 3.1)

Scientific classification
- Kingdom: Animalia
- Phylum: Chordata
- Class: Mammalia
- Order: Rodentia
- Family: Dipodidae
- Genus: Jaculus
- Species: J. jaculus

Binomial name
- Jaculus jaculus (Linnaeus, 1758)
- Lesser Egyptian jerboa range.

Synonyms
- Mus jaculus Linnaeus, 1758

= Lesser Egyptian jerboa =

Species of rodent

The lesser Egyptian jerboa (Jaculus jaculus) is a small rodent of Africa and the Middle East. Its diet consists mainly of seeds and grasses.

== Description ==
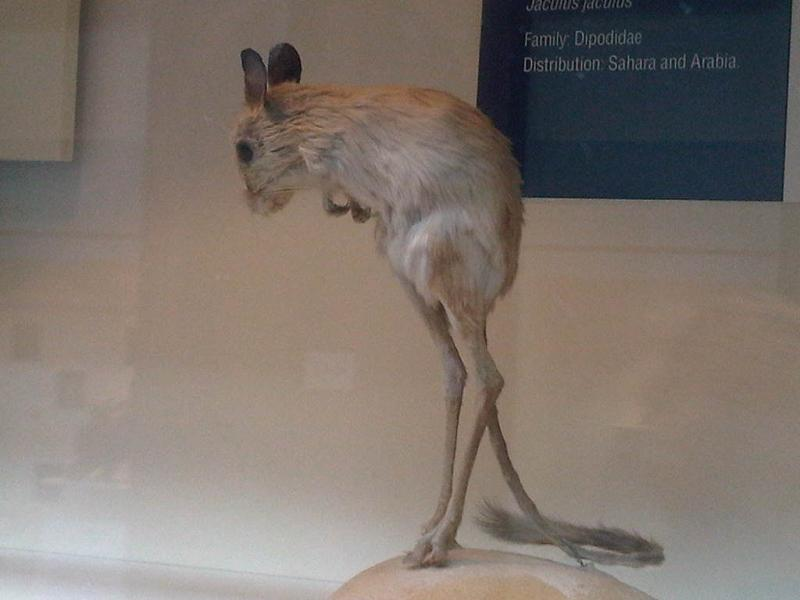
Stuffed specimen at the Natural History Museum in London, England

A small rodent, it is sometimes likened to a tiny kangaroo due to its long hind legs and hopping form of locomotion. The lesser Egyptian jerboa has three toes on each of its hind feet and a very long tail, used for balance when jumping. It has large eyes and ears and a rather stubby snout, and its coat is a pale or dark sandy colour with a paler underside.

== Biology ==
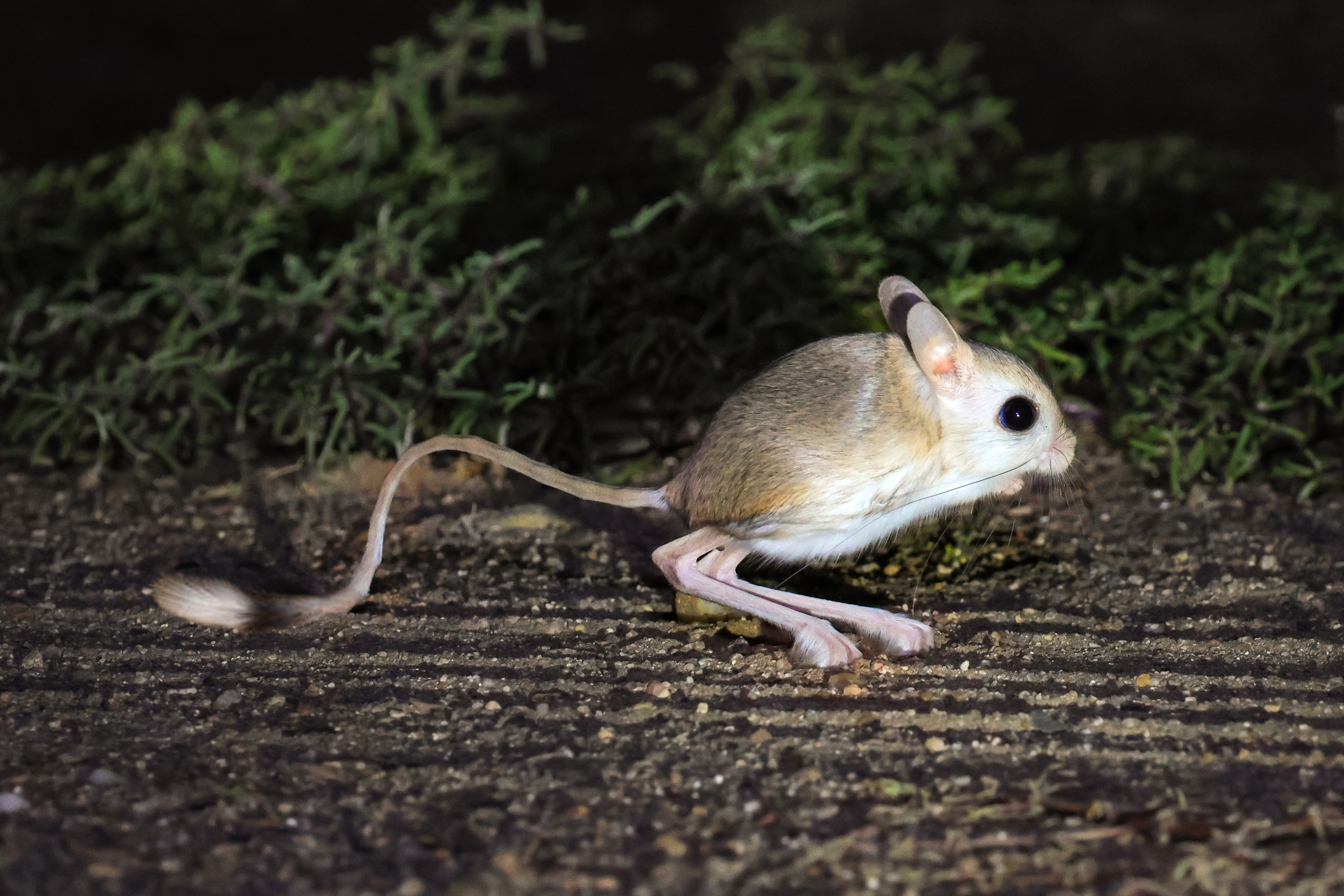
From Red Sea Coast, Saudi Arabia

The lesser Egyptian jerboa is a strictly nocturnal species, feeding on seeds, insects, succulent parts of desert grasses, and fungi (desert truffles Terfezia species), which it detects using its acute sense of smell. Amazingly, it does not need to drink in order to survive the arid desert conditions, relying on its food to provide it with all its water needs. The lesser Egyptian jerboa can travel long distances in search of food, up to ten kilometres (6.2 mi) a day, which it easily covers thanks to its large feet and hopping stride; the jerboa is known to leap up to three metres (9.8 ft) in a single bound.

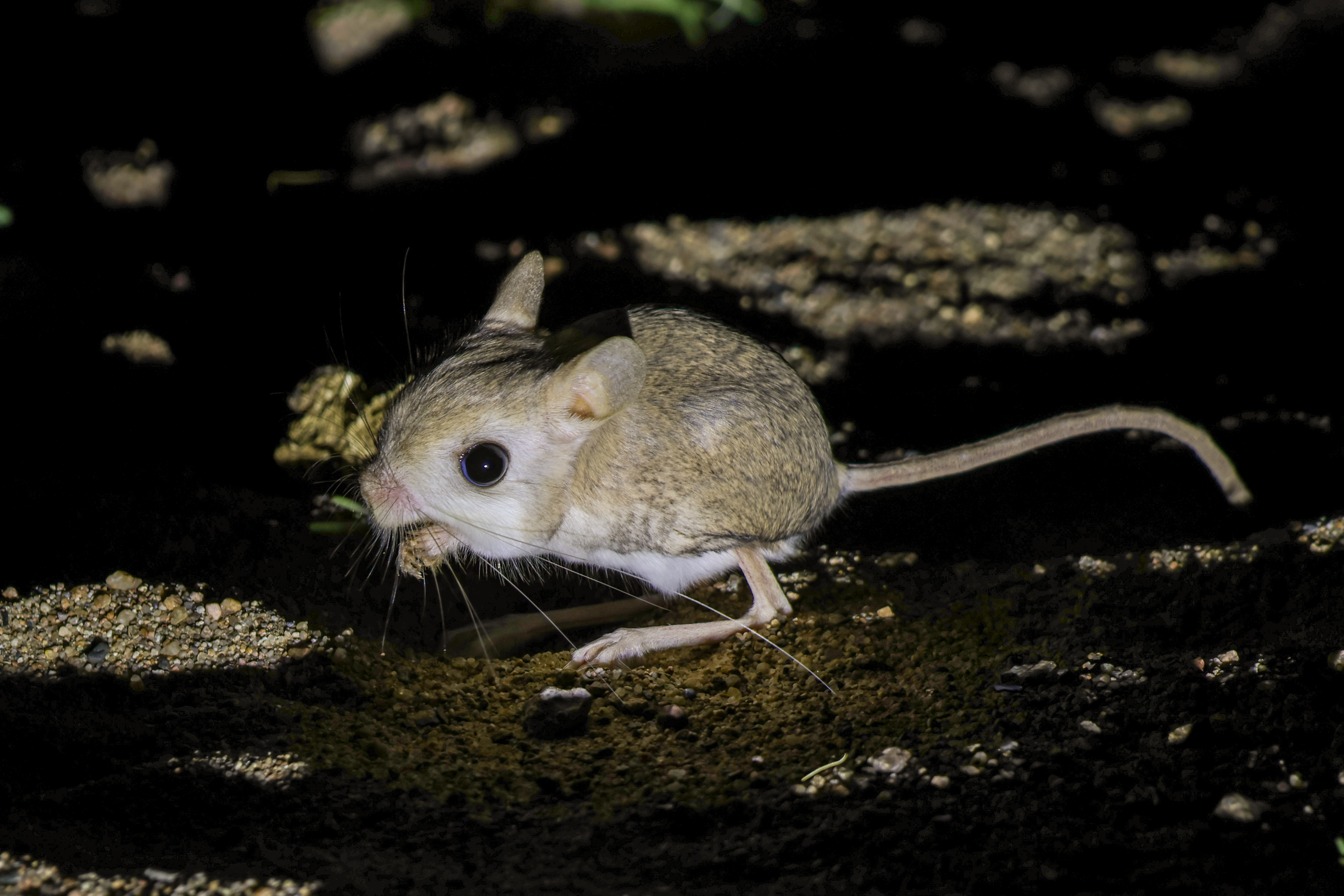
From South Yanbu, Saudi Arabia

The lesser Egyptian jerboa lives in burrows, dug in counter clockwise spirals with its forelimbs and teeth, which it uses for a variety of functions. The permanent burrows are often complex systems with multiple entrances and exits, consisting of storage chambers, hibernation chambers and a nesting chamber at the very bottom. The burrows are well-hidden and sealed with a plug of sand in late spring and summer to keep the heat out and moisture in, providing an ideal place for the animal to rest, evade predators and escape from the heat of the day. This species has also been observed sheltering under desert truffles. During particularly hot or dry spells the jerboa will aestivate in the burrow and in winter it is thought to hibernate, but this has only been reported in a few individuals.

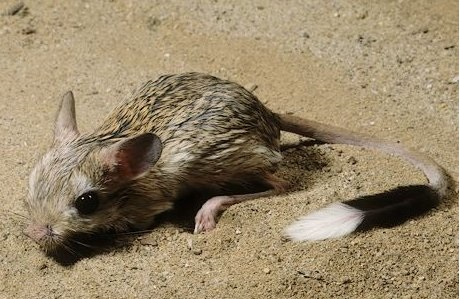
Resting in the sand

Not much is known about the breeding habits of jerboas due to their solitary and nocturnal nature. However, breeding is known to occur at least twice a year, between June and July and from October to December. Males attempt to attract females by performing a ritual display; standing on its hind legs in front of an approaching female, the male faces his potential mate and then begins to slap the female at regular intervals with his short front limbs. A successful mating usually produces a litter of four to five young that become independent at around eight to ten weeks, and sexually mature at eight to twelve months. On the whole, the lesser Egyptian jerboa is silent but when disturbed or handled it can emit grunting noises or shrill shrieks.

== Range ==
It is found throughout the Sahara Desert, in scattered areas of the Sahel, and the Middle East.

== Habitat ==
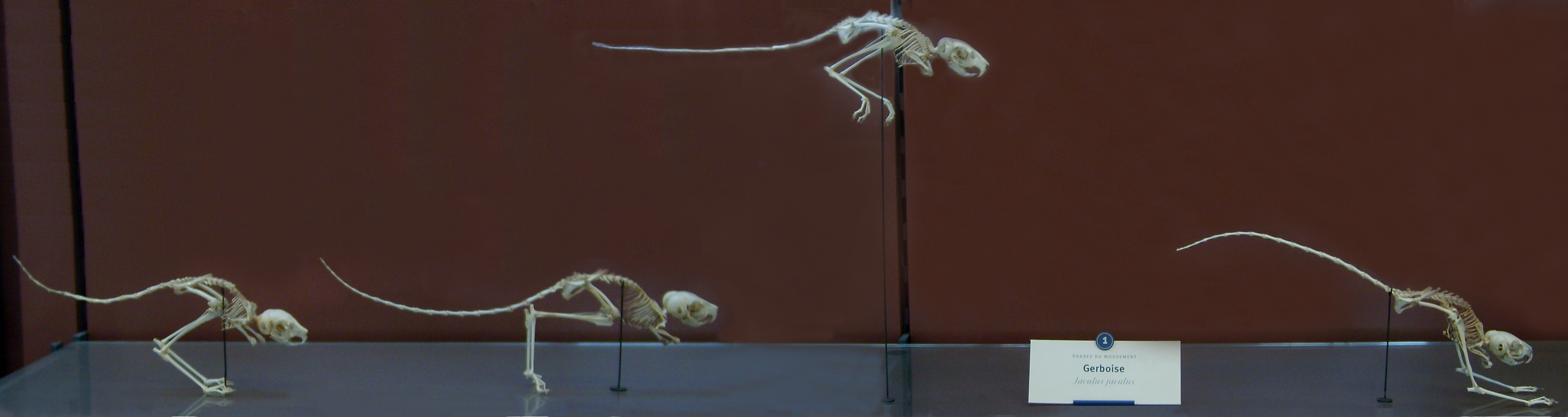
Lesser Egyptian Jerboa skeletons mounted to show a sequence of jump movements, Muséum national d'histoire naturelle, Paris

The lesser Egyptian jerboa inhabits desert areas, which may be either sandy or rocky.
