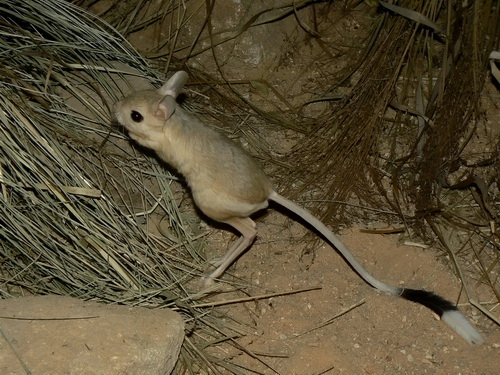

Conservation status
- Least Concern (IUCN 3.1)

Scientific classification
- Kingdom: Animalia
- Phylum: Chordata
- Class: Mammalia
- Infraclass: Placentalia
- Order: Rodentia
- Family: Dipodidae
- Genus: Jaculus
- Species: J. orientalis

Binomial name
- Jaculus orientalis Erxleben, 1777

= Greater Egyptian jerboa =

Greater Egyptian jerboa Temporal range: Late Pliocene – Present

Species of mammal

The greater Egyptian jerboa (Jaculus orientalis) is a species of rodent in the family Dipodidae. It is found in Algeria, Egypt, Libya, Morocco, Saudi Arabia, Tunisia, and is possibly extinct in the Negev Desert of Israel. Its natural habitats are subtropical or tropical dry shrubland, sandy shores, and arable land.

== Description ==
An adult greater Egyptian jerboa has a head-and-body length of about 13 centimetres (5 in) and a tail of 20 centimetres (8 in). The upper parts are yellowish-brown or sandy-brown and the underparts are white. The hind legs are very large and are about four times longer than the forelimbs. The feet have hairy pads which improves locomotion on sand. The tail is nearly naked but ends in a large tuft of hair which is black at the base and white at the tip. The tail is used as a prop to stabilise the animal when it stands and moves on its hind legs.

== Distribution and habitat ==
On the African continent, the greater Egyptian jerboa is found in Morocco, Algeria, Tunisia, Libya and Egypt. It is also present in the Judaean Desert, the Negev Desert (possibly extinct by 2016) and on the Sinai Peninsula. It occupies a wide range of habitat types including deserts and semi-deserts, sand dunes near the coast, marshes, pasture, and arable land.

== Behaviour ==
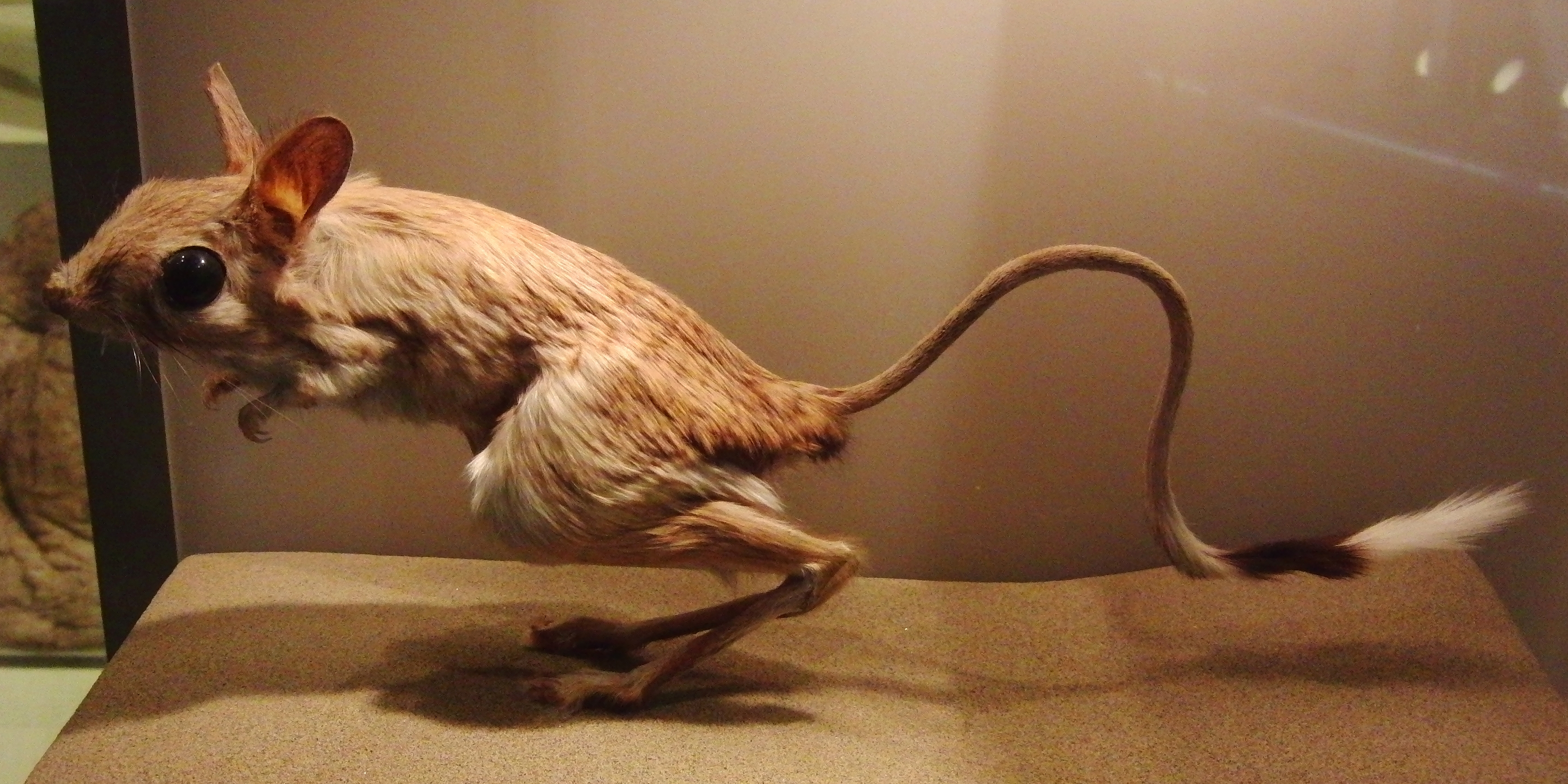
Stuffed specimen in the National Museum of Nature and Science, Tokyo, Japan

The greater Egyptian jerboa is a sociable species. The burrows are dug in firm ground and may be up to 2 metres (7 ft) long. It shelters inside during the day, emerging at dusk or at night to forage for seeds, shoots and roots. Food is sometimes stored in chambers in the burrow. This jerboa probably does not need to drink as it gets enough moisture from its food. It has been observed sheltering under, and eating desert truffles (Terfezia species).

Breeding usually takes place between November and July. The nesting chamber may have some animal fur as bedding. The gestation period is about forty days and the litter size ranges from two to five. There is a single litter in the year and a long developmental period before the young are weaned. When first born, the young have hind legs the same length as their forelegs and as they begin to move around, do so by dragging themselves with their forelimbs. The hind legs gradually lengthen and by four weeks, quadrupedal locomotion starts. Bipedal locomotion starts about seven weeks after birth.

== Status ==
The greater Egyptian jerboa has a wide range and is common in much of that range. It is a nocturnal species and seems to have no major threats. The population is stable and the International Union for Conservation of Nature has assessed its conservation status as being of "least concern".
