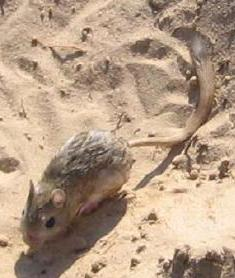

Conservation status
- Least Concern (IUCN 3.1)

Scientific classification
- Kingdom: Animalia
- Phylum: Chordata
- Class: Mammalia
- Order: Rodentia
- Family: Dipodidae
- Genus: Stylodipus
- Species: S. telum

Binomial name
- Stylodipus telum (Lichtenstein, 1823)

= Thick-tailed three-toed jerboa =

Species of rodent

The thick-tailed three-toed jerboa (Stylodipus telum) is a species of rodent in the family Dipodidae. It is found in China, Kazakhstan, Russia, Turkmenistan, Ukraine, and Uzbekistan. Its typical habitat is steppe, desert and mountain grassland where it is often found among saltbush and Artemisia in sandy or clayey soils.

== Description ==
The thick-tailed three-toed jerboa grows to a length of 104 to 133 mm (4.1 to 5.2 in) with a tail as long again and a weight of 70 to 90 grams (2.5 to 3.2 oz). The crown of the head is dark-coloured but the rest of the coat is pale greyish-yellow with many longer guard hairs with blackish tips. A white band stretches across the hips and the flanks are straw-coloured with dark flecks.

== Behaviour ==
The thick-tailed three-toed jerboa is nocturnal and is a solitary animal. It lives in a complex burrow system that may extend for two and a half metres, with many entrances each loosely blocked with a plug of soil. It also has shallow burrows within its home range which may be used by more than one individual and into which it can retreat. It feeds on green parts of plants, bulbs and seeds but does not store food for the winter. Females usually have two litters per year, each consisting of two to four young, one in spring and the other in autumn.

== Status ==
The thick-tailed three-toed jerboa has a wide range and presumed large total population. The main threat it faces is conversion of the steppe to agricultural use. Its population size is believed to be in slow decline but the International Union for Conservation of Nature has assessed its conservation status as being of "least concern".
