= List of mammals of Tajikistan =

This is a list of the mammal species recorded in Tajikistan. There are fifty-one mammal species in Tajikistan, of which four are endangered, six are vulnerable, and three are near threatened.

The following tags are used to highlight each species' conservation status as assessed by the International Union for Conservation of Nature:

EX	Extinct	No reasonable doubt that the last individual has died.
EW	Extinct in the wild	Known only to survive in captivity or as a naturalized populations well outside its previous range.
CR	Critically endangered	The species is in imminent risk of extinction in the wild.
EN	Endangered	The species is facing an extremely high risk of extinction in the wild.
VU	Vulnerable	The species is facing a high risk of extinction in the wild.
NT	Near threatened	The species does not meet any of the criteria that would categorise it as risking extinction but it is likely to do so in the future.
LC	Least concern	There are no current identifiable risks to the species.
DD	Data deficient	There is inadequate information to make an assessment of the risks to this species.

== Order: Rodentia (rodents) ==
Rodents make up the largest order of mammals, with over 40% of mammalian species. They have two incisors in the upper and lower jaw which grow continually and must be kept short by gnawing.

- Suborder: Hystricognathi
  - Family: Hystricidae (Old World porcupines)
    - Genus: Hystrix
      - Indian crested porcupine, H. indica LC presence uncertain
- Suborder: Sciurognathi
  - Family: Sciuridae (squirrels)
    - Subfamily: Xerinae
      - Tribe: Xerini
        - Genus: Spermophilopsis
          - Long-clawed ground squirrel, S. leptodactylus LC
      - Tribe: Marmotini
        - Genus: Marmota
          - Long-tailed marmot, Marmota caudata LC
          - Menzbier's marmot, Marmota menzbieri VU
  - Family: Gliridae (dormice)
    - Subfamily: Leithiinae
      - Genus: Dryomys
        - Forest dormouse, Dryomys nitedula LC
  - Family: Dipodidae (jerboas)
    - Subfamily: Allactaginae
      - Genus: Allactaga
        - Severtzov's jerboa, Allactaga severtzovi LC
        - Vinogradov's jerboa, Allactaga vinogradovi LC
  - Family: Cricetidae
    - Subfamily: Arvicolinae
      - Genus: Blanfordimys
        - Afghan vole, Blanfordimys afghanus LC
        - Bucharian vole, Blanfordimys bucharicus LC
      - Genus: Microtus
        - Juniper vole, Microtus juldaschi LC
        - Tien Shan vole, Microtus kirgisorum LC
  - Family: Muridae (mice, rats, voles, gerbils, hamsters, etc.)
    - Subfamily: Gerbillinae
      - Genus: Meriones
        - Midday jird, Meriones meridianus LC
    - Subfamily: Murinae
      - Genus: Nesokia
        - Short-tailed bandicoot rat, Nesokia indica LC

== Order: Lagomorpha (lagomorphs) ==
The lagomorphs comprise two families, Leporidae (hares and rabbits), and Ochotonidae (pikas). Though they can resemble rodents, and were classified as a superfamily in that order until the early 20th century, they have since been considered a separate order. They differ from rodents in a number of physical characteristics, such as having four incisors in the upper jaw rather than two.

- Family: Leporidae (rabbits, hares)
  - Genus: Lepus
    - Desert hare, L. tibetanus LC
- Family: Ochotonidae (pikas)
  - Genus: Ochotona
    - Large-eared pika, O. macrotis LC
    - Turkestan red pika, O. rutila LC

== Order: Erinaceomorpha (hedgehogs and gymnures) ==
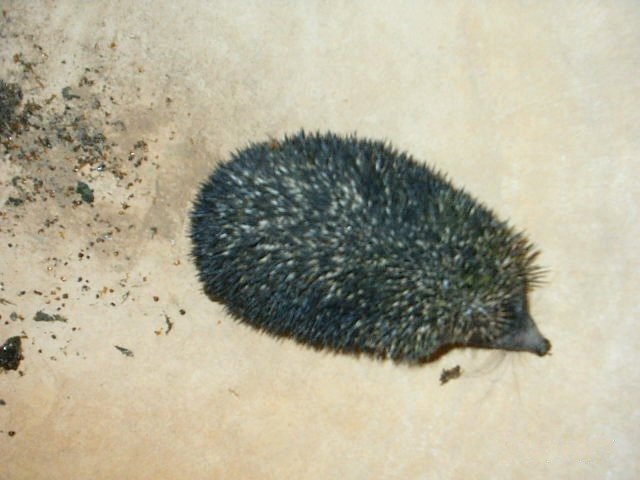
Brandt's hedgehog

The order Erinaceomorpha contains a single family, Erinaceidae, which comprise the hedgehogs and gymnures. The hedgehogs are easily recognised by their spines while gymnures look more like large rats.

- Family: Erinaceidae (hedgehogs)
  - Subfamily: Erinaceinae
    - Genus: Hemiechinus
      - Long-eared hedgehog, H. auritus LC
    - Genus: Paraechinus
      - Brandt's hedgehog, P. hypomelas LC

== Order: Soricomorpha (shrews, moles, and solenodons) ==
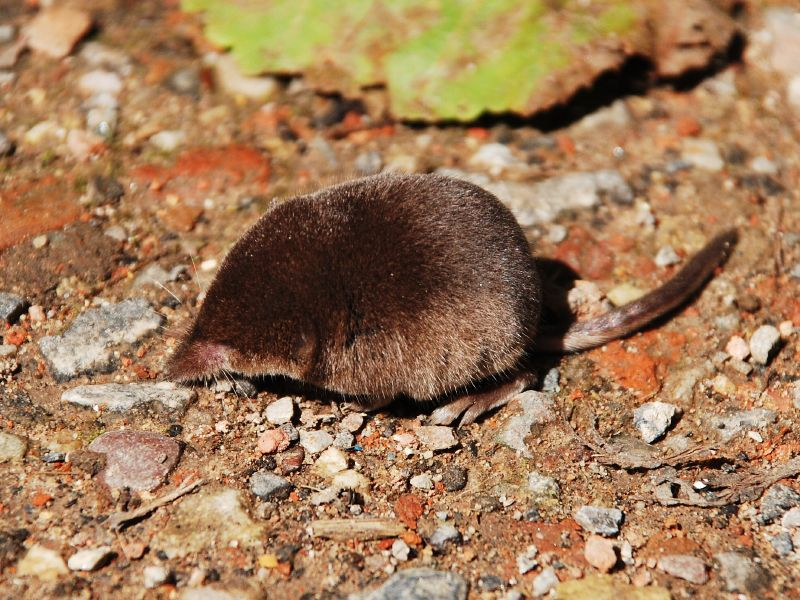
Eurasian pygmy shrew

The Soricomorpha are insectivorous mammals. The shrews and solenodons resemble mice while the moles are stout-bodied burrowers.

- Family: Soricidae (shrews)
  - Subfamily: Crocidurinae
    - Genus: Crocidura
      - Lesser rock shrew, C. serezkyensis LC
  - Subfamily: Soricinae
    - Tribe: Soricini
      - Genus: Sorex
        - Buchara shrew, S. buchariensis LC
        - Eurasian pygmy shrew, S. minutus LC

== Order: Chiroptera (bats) ==
The bats' most distinguishing feature is that their forelimbs are developed as wings, making them the only mammals capable of flight. Bat species account for about 20% of all mammals.

- Family: Vespertilionidae
  - Subfamily: Myotinae
    - Genus: Myotis
      - Geoffroy's bat, M. emarginatus LC
      - Fraternal myotis, Myotis frater LC
  - Subfamily: Vespertilioninae
    - Genus: Eptesicus
      - Botta's serotine, Eptesicus bottae LC
    - Genus: Otonycteris
      - Desert long-eared bat, Otonycteris hemprichii LC
  - Subfamily: Miniopterinae
    - Genus: Miniopterus
      - Common bent-wing bat, M. schreibersii VU
- Family: Molossidae
  - Genus: Tadarida
    - European free-tailed bat, Tadarida teniotis LC
- Family: Rhinolophidae
  - Subfamily: Rhinolophinae
    - Genus: Rhinolophus
      - Greater horseshoe bat, R. ferrumequinum LC
      - Lesser horseshoe bat, R. hipposideros LC

== Order: Carnivora (carnivorans) ==
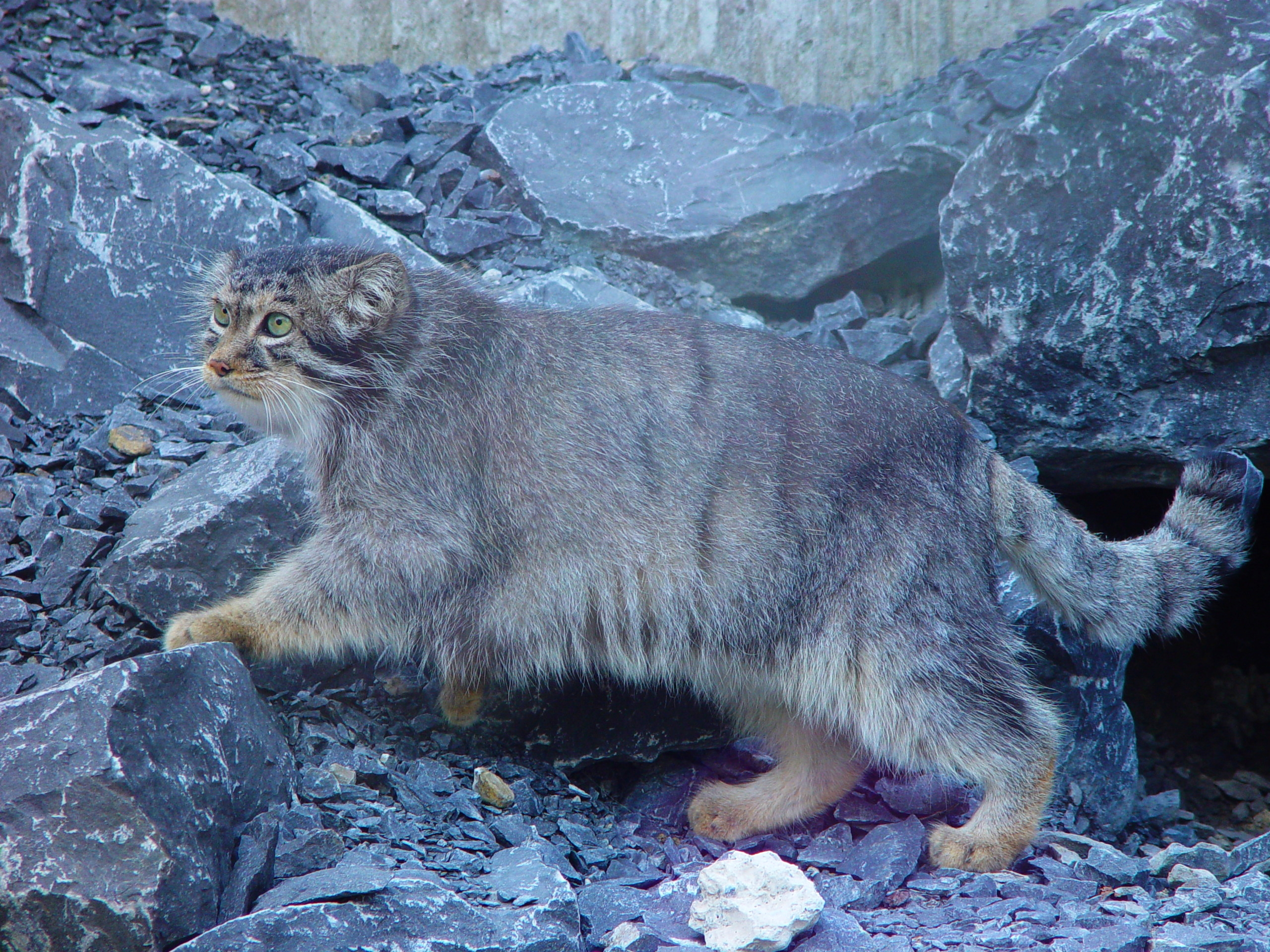
Pallas's cat

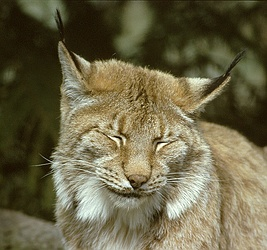
Eurasian lynx

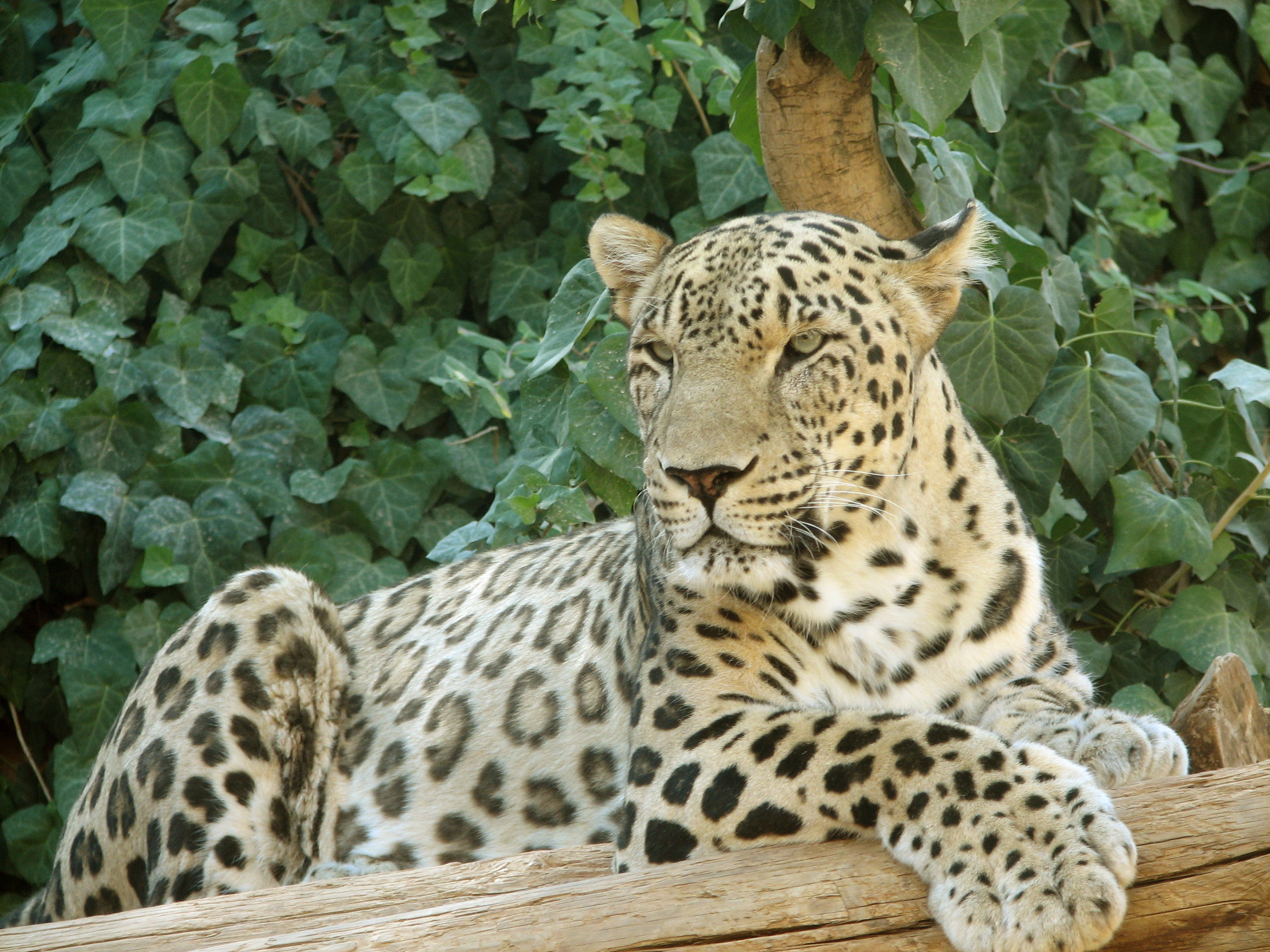
Persian leopard

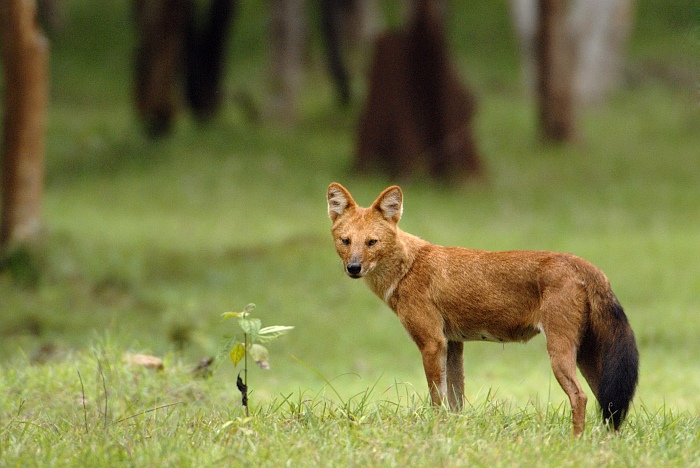
Dhole

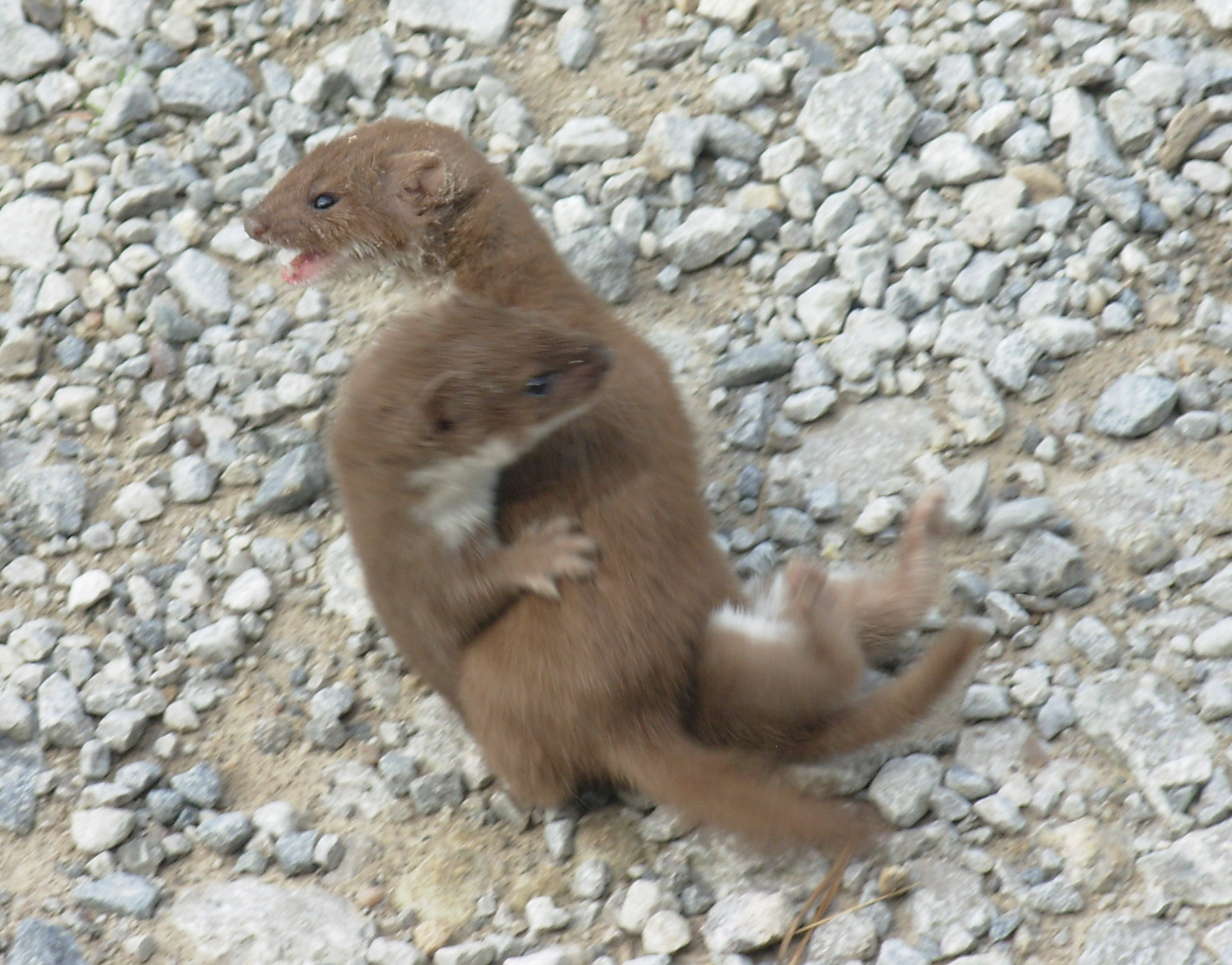
Least weasel

There are over 260 species of carnivorans, the majority of which feed primarily on meat. They have a characteristic skull shape and dentition.

- Suborder: Feliformia
  - Family: Felidae (cats)
    - Subfamily: Felinae
      - Genus: Caracal
        - Caracal, C. caracal LC
      - Genus: Felis
        - Jungle cat, F. chaus LC
        - African wildcat, F. lybica LC
          - Asiatic wildcat, F. l. ornata
      - Genus: Lynx
        - Eurasian lynx, L. lynx LC
      - Genus: Otocolobus
        - Pallas's cat, O. manul LC
    - Subfamily: Pantherinae
      - Genus: Panthera
        - Snow leopard, P. uncia VU
  - Family: Hyaenidae (hyaenas)
    - Genus: Hyaena
      - Striped hyena, H. hyaena NT
- Suborder: Caniformia
  - Family: Canidae (dogs, foxes)
    - Genus: Canis
      - Golden jackal, C. aureus LC
      - Gray wolf, C. lupus LC
        - Steppe wolf, C. l. campestris
    - Genus: Vulpes
      - Red fox, V. vulpes LC
    - Genus: Cuon
      - Dhole, C. alpinus EN (extirpated from the country)
  - Family: Ursidae (bears)
    - Genus: Ursus
      - Brown bear, U. arctos LC
  - Family: Mustelidae (mustelids)
    - Genus: Lutra
      - European otter, L. lutra NT
    - Genus: Meles
      - Caucasian badger, M. canescens NE presence uncertain
    - Genus: Mustela
      - Mountain weasel, M. altaica NT
      - Stoat, M. erminea LC
      - Steppe polecat, M. eversmannii LC
      - Least weasel, M. nivalis LC

== Order: Artiodactyla (even-toed ungulates) ==
The even-toed ungulates are ungulates whose weight is borne about equally by the third and fourth toes, rather than mostly or entirely by the third as in perissodactyls. There are about 220 artiodactyl species, including many that are of great economic importance to humans.

- Family: Bovidae (cattle, antelope, sheep, goats)
  - Subfamily: Antilopinae
    - Genus: Gazella
      - Goitered gazelle, G. subgutturosa VU
  - Subfamily: Caprinae
    - Genus: Capra
      - Markhor, C. falconeri NT
      - Siberian ibex, C. sibirica NT
    - Genus: Ovis
      - Argali, O. ammon NT
      - Urial, O. vignei VU
    - Genus: Pseudois
      - Bharal, P. nayaur LC presence uncertain, vagrant
- Family: Cervidae (deer)
  - Subfamily: Cervinae
    - Genus: Cervus
      - Central Asian red deer C. hanglu LC

== Locally extinct ==
The following species are locally extinct:

- Cheetah, Acinonyx jubatus
- Dhole, Cuon alpinus
- Onager, Equus hemionus
- Leopard, Panthera pardus possibly locally extinct
- Tiger, Panthera tigris

== See also ==
- List of chordate orders
- Lists of mammals by region
- List of prehistoric mammals
- Mammal classification
- List of mammals described in the 2000s
