= List of mammals of Afghanistan =

This list of the mammal species in Afghanistan provides information about the status of the 129 mammal species occurring in Afghanistan. Four are endangered, twelve are vulnerable, and five are near threatened. The following classes, which lie on a spectrum of lowest to highest risk of extinction, are used to highlight each species' global conservation status as assessed on the IUCN Red List:

LC	Least concern	There are no current identifiable risks to the species.
NT	Near threatened	The species does not meet any of the criteria that would categorise it as risking extinction, but it is likely to do so in the future.
VU	Vulnerable	The species is facing a high risk of extinction in the wild.
EN	Endangered	The species is facing an extremely high risk of extinction in the wild.
CR	Critically endangered	The species is in imminent risk of extinction in the wild.
EW	Extinct in the wild	The species is known only to survive in captivity or as a naturalized population well outside its previous range.
EX	Extinct	There is no reasonable doubt that the last individual of the species has died.
DD	Data deficient	There is inadequate information to make an assessment of the risks to this species.

== Order: Artiodactyla (even-toed ungulates) ==
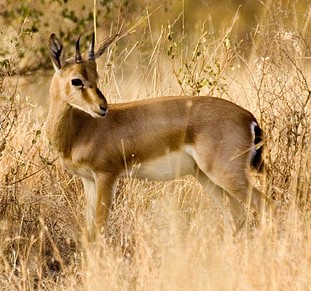
Chinkara

The even-toed ungulates are ungulates whose weight is borne about equally by the third and fourth toes, rather than mostly or entirely by the third as in perissodactyls. There are about 220 artiodactyl species, including many that are of great economic importance to humans.

- Family: Bovidae (cattle, antelope, sheep, goats)
  - Subfamily: Antilopinae
    - Genus: Gazella
      - Chinkara, G. bennettii LC
      - Goitered gazelle, G. subgutturosa VU
    - Genus: Capra
      - Wild goat, C. aegagrus NT presence uncertain
      - Markhor, C. falconeri NT
      - Siberian ibex, C. sibrica NT
    - Genus: Ovis
      - Argali, O. ammon NT
      - Urial, O. vignei VU
    - Genus: Nemorhaedus
      - Himalayan goral, N. goral NT
- Family: Moschidae
  - Genus: Moschus
    - Kashmir musk deer, M. cupreus EN
- Family: Cervidae (deer)
  - Subfamily: Cervinae
    - Genus: Cervus
      - Central Asian red deer C. hanglu LC
        - Bactrian deer, C. h. bactrianus
- Family: Suidae (pigs)
  - Subfamily: Suinae
    - Genus: Sus
      - Wild boar, S. scrofa LC

== Order: Carnivora (carnivorans) ==
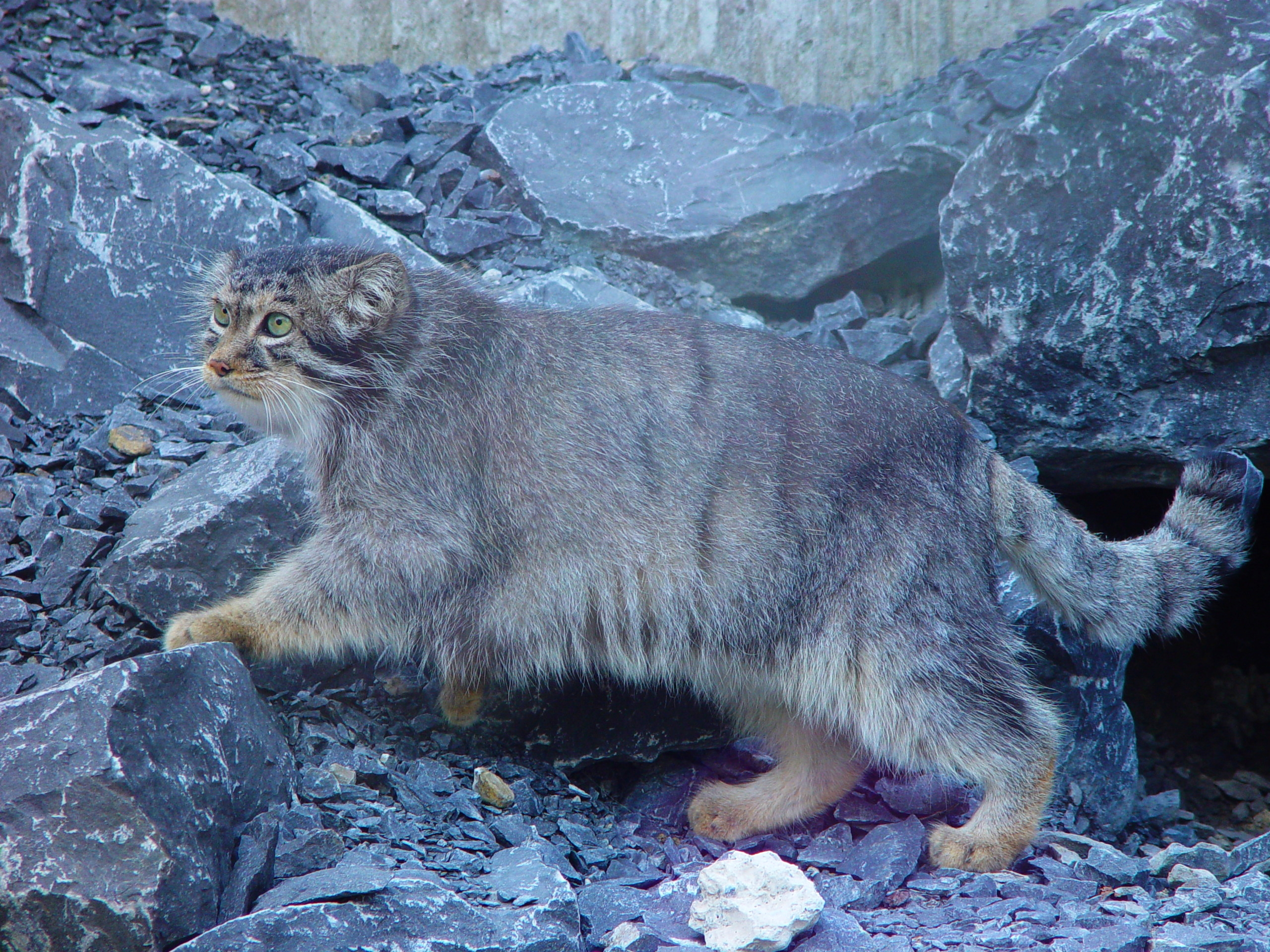
Pallas's cat

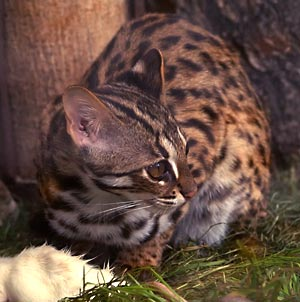
Leopard cat

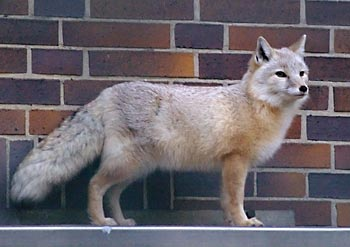
Corsac fox

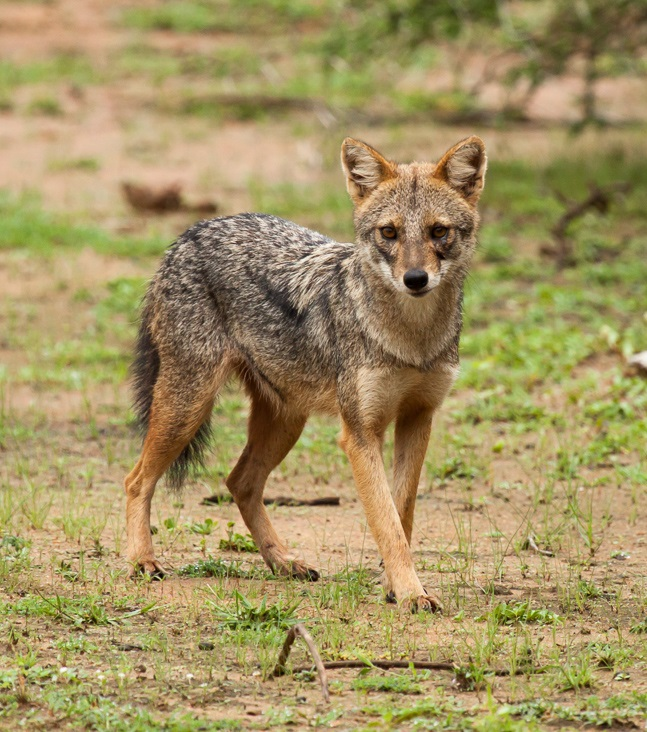
Golden jackal

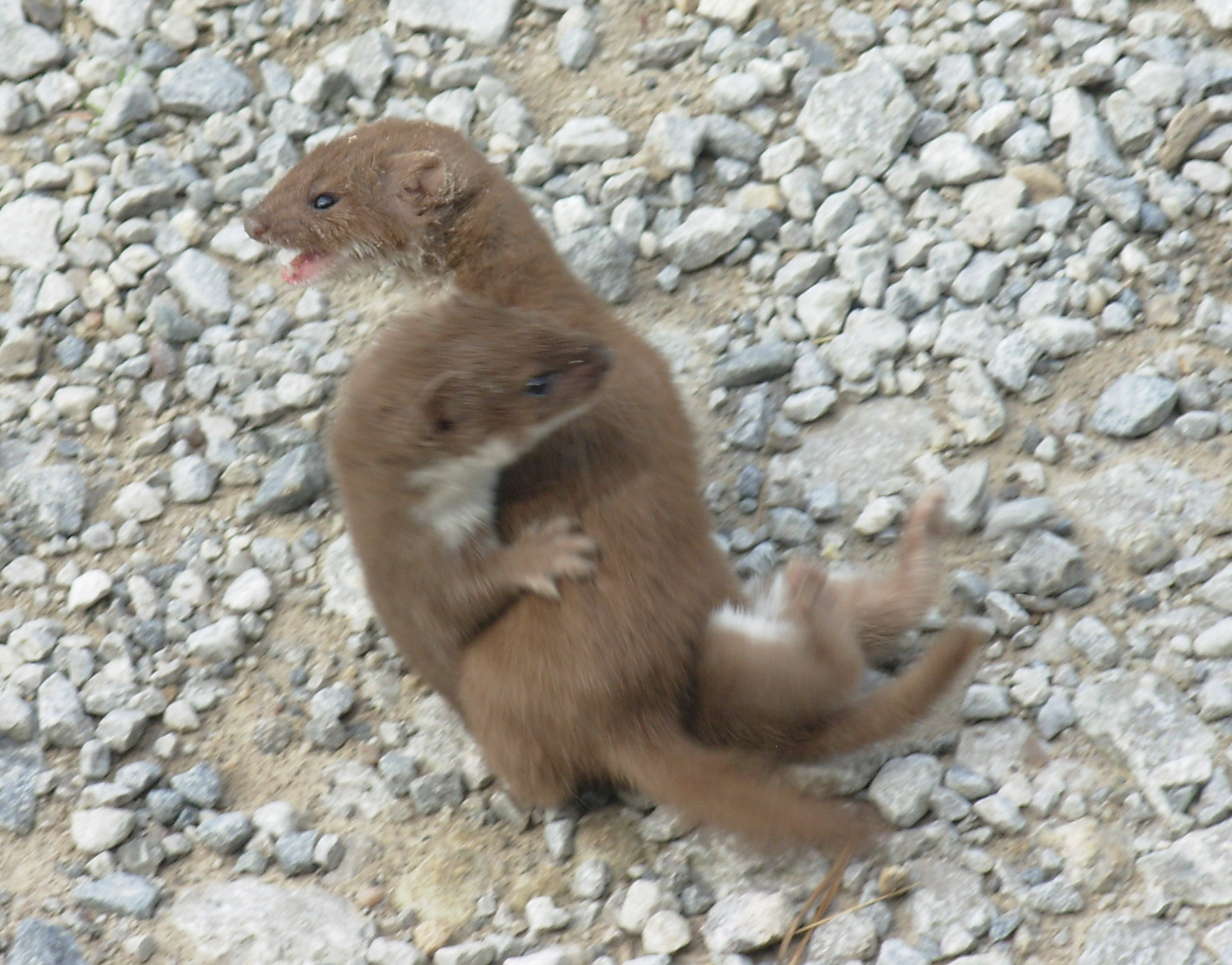
Least weasel

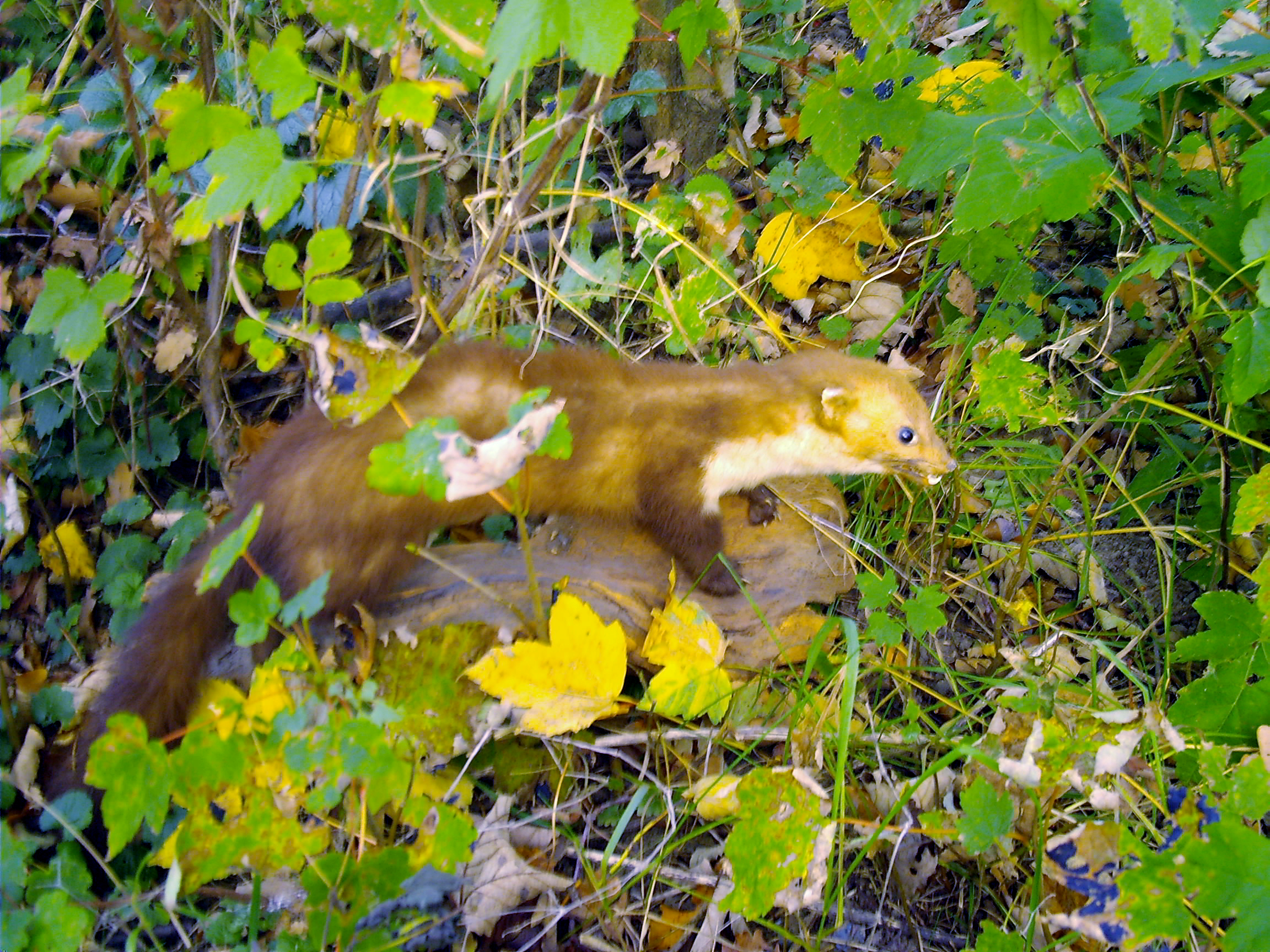
Beech marten

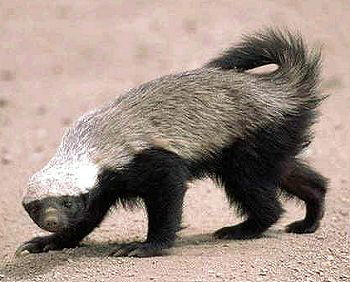
Honey badger

There are over 260 species of carnivorans, the majority of which eat meat as their primary dietary item. They have a characteristic skull shape and dentition.

The following species are listed as historically present:

- Suborder: Feliformia
  - Family: Felidae (cats)
    - Subfamily: Felinae
      - Genus: Caracal
        - Caracal, C. caracal LC
      - Genus: Felis
        - Jungle cat, F. chaus LC
        - African wildcat, F. lybica LC
          - Asiatic wildcat, F. l. ornata
      - Genus: Lynx
        - Eurasian lynx, L. lynx LC
      - Genus: Otocolobus
        - Pallas's cat, O. manul LC
      - Genus: Prionailurus
        - Leopard cat, P. bengalensis LC
    - Subfamily: Pantherinae
      - Genus: Panthera
        - Leopard, P. pardus VU
          - P. p. tulliana EN
        - Snow leopard, P. uncia VU
  - Family: Herpestidae (mongooses)
    - Genus: Urva
      - Small Indian mongoose, U. auropunctata LC
      - Indian grey mongoose, U. edwardsii LC
  - Family: Hyaenidae (hyaenas)
    - Genus: Hyaena
      - Striped hyena, H. hyaena NT
- Suborder: Caniformia
  - Family: Canidae (dogs, foxes)
    - Genus: Vulpes
      - Blanford's fox, V. cana LC
      - Corsac fox, V. corsac LC
      - Rueppell's fox, V. rueppelli LC
      - Red fox, V. vulpes LC
    - Genus: Canis
      - Golden jackal, C. aureus LC
      - Gray wolf, C. lupus LC
  - Family: Ursidae (bears)
    - Genus: Ursus
      - Brown bear, U. arctos LC
      - Asiatic black bear, U. thibetanus VU
  - Family: Mustelidae (mustelids)
    - Genus: Lutra
      - European otter, L. lutra NT
    - Genus: Martes
      - Yellow-throated marten, M. flavigula LC
      - Beech marten, M. foina LC
    - Genus: Meles
      - Caucasian badger, M. canescens NE presence uncertain
    - Genus: Mellivora
      - Honey badger, M. capensis LC
    - Genus: Mustela
      - Stoat, M. erminea LC
      - Least weasel, M. nivalis LC
    - Genus: Vormela
      - Marbled polecat, V. peregusna VU

== Order: Chiroptera (bats) ==
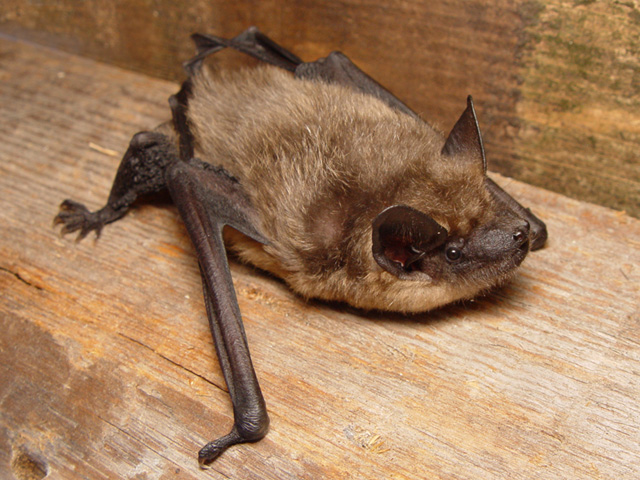
Serotine bat

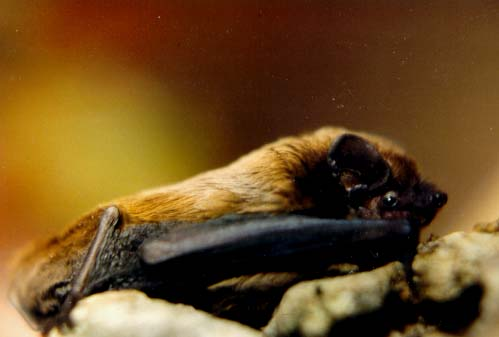
Lesser noctule

The bats' most distinguishing feature is that their forelimbs are developed as wings, making them the only mammals capable of flight. Bat species account for about 20% of all mammals.

- Family: Vespertilionidae
  - Subfamily: Myotinae
    - Genus: Myotis
      - Lesser mouse-eared bat, M. blythii LC
      - Geoffroy's bat, M. emarginatus LC
      - Hodgson's bat, M. formosus LC
      - Fraternal myotis, M. frater LC
      - Kashmir cave bat, M. longipes DD
      - Whiskered myotis, M. muricola LC
      - Whiskered bat, M. mystacinus LC
  - Subfamily: Vespertilioninae
    - Genus: Barbastella
      - Eastern barbastelle, B. leucomelas LC
    - Genus: Eptesicus
      - Botta's serotine, Eptesicus bottae LC
      - Gobi big brown bat, Eptesicus gobiensis LC
      - Serotine bat, Eptesicus serotinus LC
    - Genus: Hypsugo
      - Savi's pipistrelle, H. savii LC
    - Genus: Nyctalus
      - Lesser noctule, N. leisleri LC
      - Mountain noctule, Nyctalus montanus LC
    - Genus: Otonycteris
      - Desert long-eared bat, Otonycteris hemprichii LC
    - Genus: Pipistrellus
      - Indian pipistrelle, Pipistrellus coromandra LC
      - Java pipistrelle, Pipistrellus javanicus LC
      - Kuhl's pipistrelle, Pipistrellus kuhlii LC
      - Common pipistrelle, Pipistrellus pipistrellus LC
      - Least pipistrelle, Pipistrellus tenuis LC
    - Genus: Plecotus
      - Grey long-eared bat, Plecotus austriacus LC
    - Genus: Scotophilus
      - Greater Asiatic yellow bat, Scotophilus heathi LC
    - Genus: Vespertilio
      - Parti-coloured bat, Vespertilio murinus LC
    - Genus: Rhyneptesicus
      - Sind bat, R. nasutus LC
  - Subfamily: Miniopterinae
    - Genus: Miniopterus
      - Common bent-wing bat, M. schreibersii VU
- Family: Rhinopomatidae
  - Genus: Rhinopoma
    - Lesser mouse-tailed bat, Rhinopoma hardwickei LC
    - Small mouse-tailed bat, Rhinopoma muscatellum LC
- Family: Molossidae
  - Genus: Tadarida
    - European free-tailed bat, T. teniotis LC
- Family: Megadermatidae
  - Genus: Megaderma
    - Megaderma lyra LC
- Family: Rhinolophidae
  - Subfamily: Rhinolophinae
    - Genus: Rhinolophus
      - Blasius's horseshoe bat, R. blasii LC
      - Bokhara horseshoe bat, Rhinolophus bocharicus LC
      - Greater horseshoe bat, R. ferrumequinum LC
      - Lesser horseshoe bat, R. hipposideros LC
      - Blyth's horseshoe bat, Rhinolophus lepidus LC
      - Mehely's horseshoe bat, R. mehelyi VU
  - Subfamily: Hipposiderinae
    - Genus: Asellia
      - Trident leaf-nosed bat, Asellia tridens LC
    - Genus: Hipposideros
      - Fulvus roundleaf bat, Hipposideros fulvus LC

== Order: Erinaceomorpha (hedgehogs and gymnures) ==
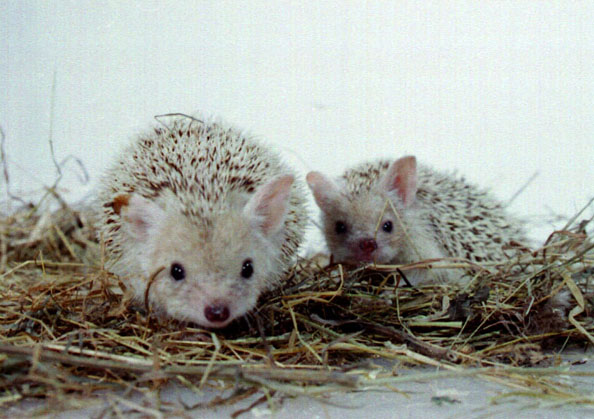
Long-eared hedgehog

The order Erinaceomorpha contains a single family, Erinaceidae, which comprise the hedgehogs and gymnures. The hedgehogs are easily recognised by their spines while gymnures look more like large rats.

- Family: Erinaceidae (hedgehogs)
  - Subfamily: Erinaceinae
    - Genus: Hemiechinus
      - Long-eared hedgehog, H. auritus LC
    - Genus: Paraechinus
      - Brandt's hedgehog, P. hypomelas LC

== Order: Lagomorpha (lagomorphs) ==
The lagomorphs comprise two families, Leporidae (hares and rabbits), and Ochotonidae (pikas). Though they can resemble rodents, and were classified as a superfamily in that order until the early 20th century, they have since been considered a separate order. They differ from rodents in a number of physical characteristics, such as having four incisors in the upper jaw rather than two.

- Family: Leporidae (rabbits, hares)
  - Genus: Lepus
    - Cape hare, L. capensis LC
    - Desert hare, L. tibetanus LC
    - Tolai hare, L. tolai LC
- Family: Ochotonidae (pikas)
  - Genus: Ochotona
    - Large-eared pika, O. macrotis LC
    - Afghan pika, O. rufescens LC
    - Turkestan red pika, O. rutila LC

== Order: Primates ==
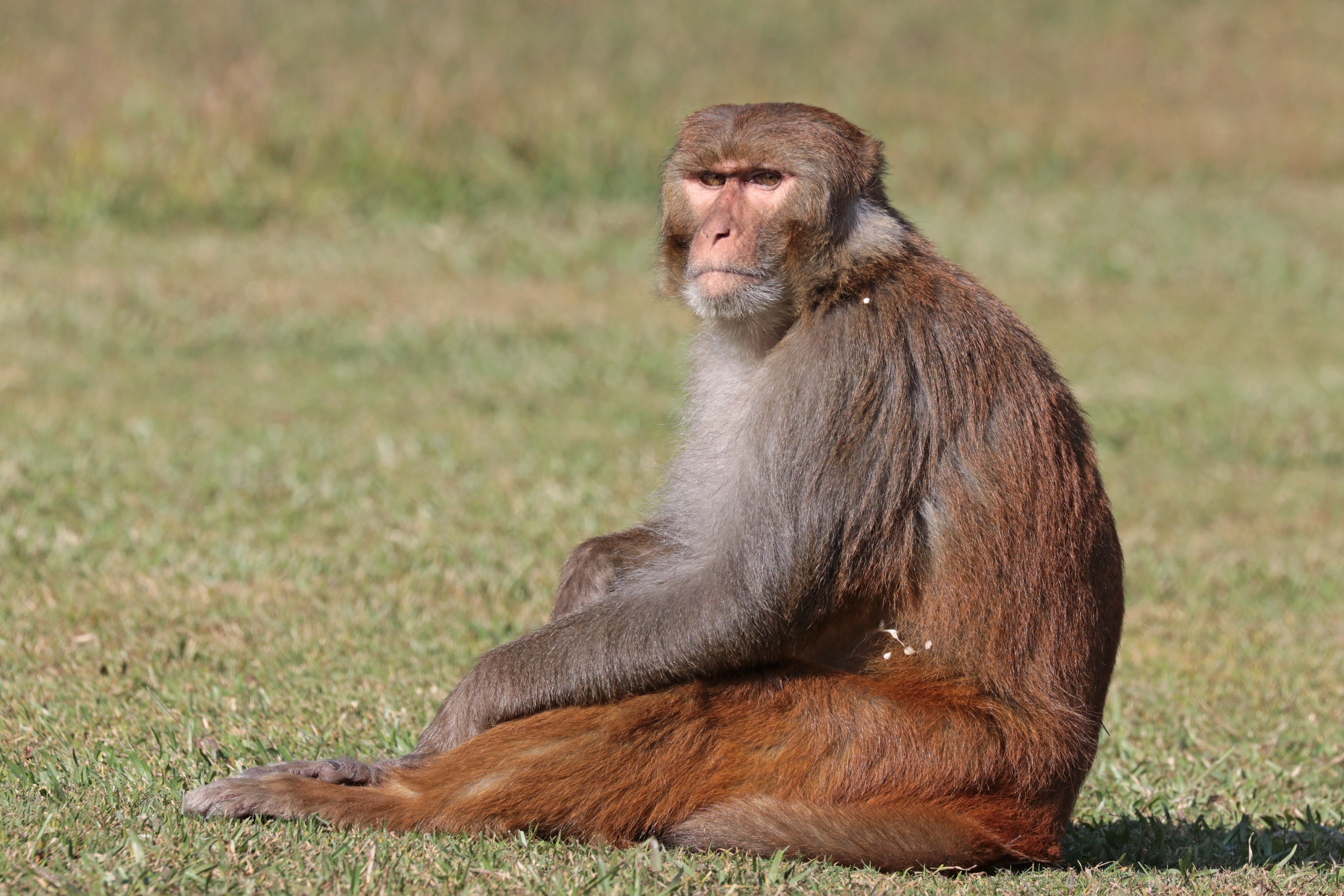
Rhesus macaque

The order Primates contains humans and their closest relatives: lemurs, lorisoids, monkeys, and apes.

- Family: Cercopithecidae (Old World monkeys)
  - Genus: Macaca
    - Rhesus macaque, M. mulatta LC
- Family: Hominidae (hominids)
  - Genus: Homo
    - Human, H. sapiens LC

== Order: Rodentia (rodents) ==
Rodents make up the largest order of mammals, with over 40 percent of mammalian species. They have two incisors in the upper and lower jaw which grow continually and must be kept short by gnawing. Most rodents are small though the capybara can weigh up to 45 kg (100 lb).

- Suborder: Hystricognathi
  - Family: Hystricidae (Old World porcupines)
    - Genus: Hystrix
      - Indian crested porcupine, H. indica LC
- Suborder: Sciurognathi
  - Family: Sciuridae (squirrels)
    - Subfamily: Sciurinae
      - Tribe: Pteromyini
        - Genus: Hylopetes
          - Afghan flying squirrel, H. baberi LC
        - Genus: Petaurista
          - Red giant flying squirrel, P. petaurista LC
    - Subfamily: Callosciurinae
      - Genus: Funambulus
        - Northern palm squirrel, Funambulus pennantii LC
    - Subfamily: Xerinae
      - Tribe: Xerini
        - Genus: Spermophilopsis
          - Long-clawed ground squirrel, Spermophilopsis leptodactylus LC
      - Tribe: Marmotini
        - Genus: Marmota
          - Long-tailed marmot, Marmota caudata LC
        - Genus: Spermophilus
          - Yellow ground squirrel, Spermophilus fulvus LC
  - Family: Gliridae (dormice)
    - Subfamily: Leithiinae
      - Genus: Dryomys
        - Forest dormouse, Dryomys nitedula LC
  - Family: Dipodidae (jerboas)
    - Subfamily: Allactaginae
      - Genus: Allactaga
        - Small five-toed jerboa, Allactaga elater LC
        - Euphrates jerboa, Allactaga euphratica LC
        - Hotson's jerboa, Allactaga hotsoni LC
    - Subfamily: Cardiocraniinae
      - Genus: Salpingotus
        - Thomas's pygmy jerboa, Salpingotus thomasi DD
    - Subfamily: Dipodinae
      - Genus: Jaculus
        - Blanford's jerboa, Jaculus blanfordi LC
  - Family: Calomyscidae
    - Genus: Calomyscus
      - Baluchi mouse-like hamster, Calomyscus baluchi LC
      - Afghan mouse-like hamster, Calomyscus mystax LC
  - Family: Cricetidae
    - Subfamily: Cricetinae
      - Genus: Cricetulus
        - Grey dwarf hamster, Cricetulus migratorius LC
    - Subfamily: Arvicolinae
      - Genus: Alticola
        - Silver mountain vole, Alticola argentatus LC
      - Genus: Blanfordimys
        - Afghan vole, Blanfordimys afghanus LC
        - Bucharian vole, Blanfordimys bucharicus LC
      - Genus: Ellobius
        - Southern mole vole, Ellobius fuscocapillus LC
      - Genus: Microtus
        - Juniper vole, Microtus juldaschi LC
        - Tien Shan vole, Microtus kirgisorum LC
        - Transcaspian vole, Microtus transcaspicus LC
  - Family: Muridae (mice, rats, voles, gerbils, hamsters, etc.)
    - Subfamily: Gerbillinae
      - Genus: Gerbillus
        - Swarthy gerbil, Gerbillus aquilus LC
        - Balochistan gerbil, Gerbillus nanus LC
      - Genus: Meriones
        - Sundevall's jird, Meriones crassus LC
        - Libyan jird, Meriones libycus LC
        - Mid-day jird, Meriones meridianus LC
        - Persian jird, Meriones persicus LC
        - Zarudny's jird, Meriones zarudnyi EN
      - Genus: Rhombomys
        - Great gerbil, Rhombomys opimus LC
      - Genus: Tatera
        - Indian gerbil, Tatera indica LC
    - Subfamily: Murinae
      - Genus: Apodemus
        - Ward's field mouse, Apodemus wardi LC
      - Genus: Millardia
        - Sand-colored soft-furred rat, Millardia gleadowi LC
      - Genus: Nesokia
        - Short-tailed bandicoot rat, Nesokia indica LC
      - Genus: Rattus
        - Tanezumi rat, Rattus tanezumi LC
        - Turkestan rat, Rattus turkestanicus LC

== Order: Soricomorpha (shrews, moles, and solenodons) ==
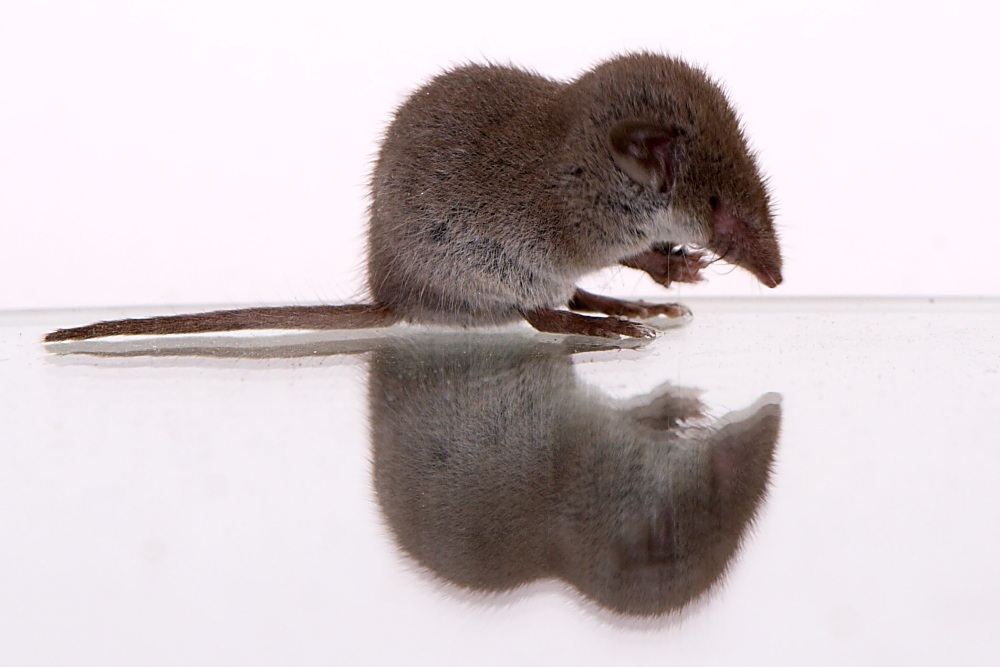
Lesser white-toothed shrew

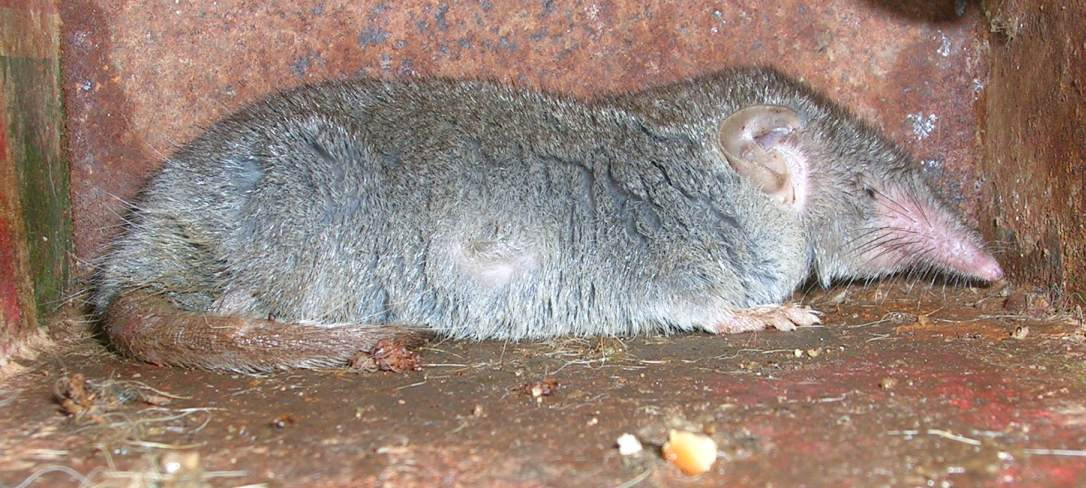
Asian house shrew

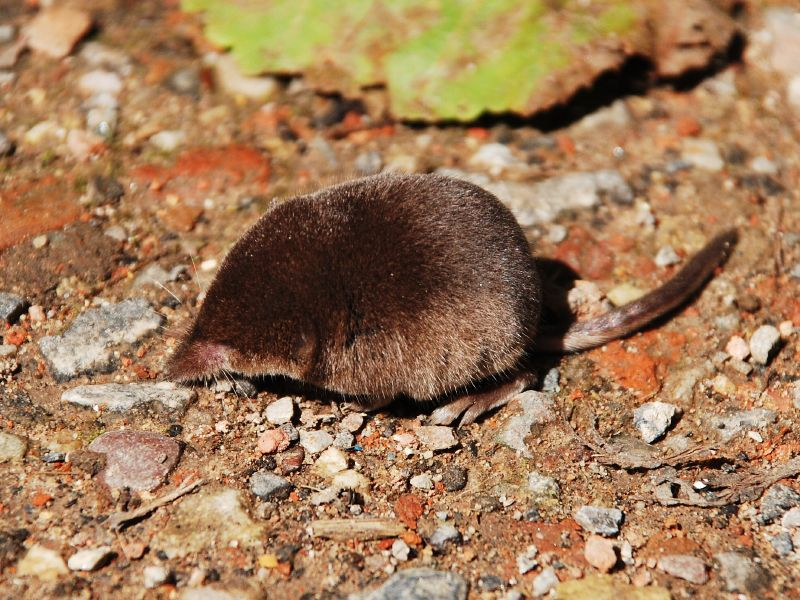
Eurasian pygmy shrew

The Soricomorpha are insectivorous mammals. The shrews and solenodons resemble mice while the moles are stout-bodied burrowers.

- Family: Soricidae (shrews)
  - Subfamily: Crocidurinae
    - Genus: Crocidura
      - Gmelin's white-toothed shrew, C. gmelini LC
      - Taiga shrew, C. pullata LC
      - Lesser white-toothed shrew, C. suaveolens LC
      - Zarudny's shrew, C. zarudnyi LC
    - Genus: Suncus
      - Etruscan shrew, S. etruscus LC
      - Asian house shrew, S. murinus LC
  - Subfamily: Soricinae
    - Tribe: Soricini
      - Genus: Sorex
        - Eurasian pygmy shrew, S. minutus LC

== Locally extinct ==
The following species are locally extinct in the country:

- Cheetah, Acinonyx jubatus
- Dhole, Cuon alpinus
- Onager, Equus hemionus
- Lion, Panthera leo
- Tiger, Panthera tigris

== See also ==
- List of chordate orders
- Lists of mammals by region
- Mammal classification
