= List of mammals of Uzbekistan =

This is a list of the mammal species recorded in Uzbekistan. There are 98 mammal species in Uzbekistan, of which one is critically endangered, three are endangered, six are vulnerable, and four are near threatened.

The following tags are used to highlight each species' conservation status as assessed by the International Union for Conservation of Nature:

EX	Extinct	No reasonable doubt that the last individual has died.
EW	Extinct in the wild	Known only to survive in captivity or as a naturalized populations well outside its previous range.
CR	Critically endangered	The species is in imminent risk of extinction in the wild.
EN	Endangered	The species is facing an extremely high risk of extinction in the wild.
VU	Vulnerable	The species is facing a high risk of extinction in the wild.
NT	Near threatened	The species does not meet any of the criteria that would categorise it as risking extinction but it is likely to do so in the future.
LC	Least concern	There are no current identifiable risks to the species.
DD	Data deficient	There is inadequate information to make an assessment of the risks to this species.

== Order: Rodentia (rodents) ==
Rodents make up the largest order of mammals, with over 40% of mammalian species. They have two incisors in the upper and lower jaw which grow continually and must be kept short by gnawing. Most rodents are small though the capybara can weigh up to 45 kg (99 lb).

- Suborder: Hystricognathi
  - Family: Hystricidae (Old World porcupines)
    - Genus: Hystrix
      - Indian crested porcupine, H. indica LC presence uncertain
- Suborder: Sciurognathi
  - Family: Sciuridae (squirrels)
    - Subfamily: Xerinae
      - Tribe: Xerini
        - Genus: Spermophilopsis
          - Long-clawed ground squirrel, S. leptodactylus LC
      - Tribe: Marmotini
        - Genus: Marmota
          - Long-tailed marmot, M. caudata LC
          - Menzbier's marmot, M. menzbieri VU
        - Genus: Spermophilus
          - Yellow ground squirrel, Spermophilus fulvus
          - Little ground squirrel, Spermophilus pygmaeus
  - Family: Gliridae (dormice)
    - Subfamily: Leithiinae
      - Genus: Dryomys
        - Forest dormouse, Dryomys nitedula
  - Family: Dipodidae (jerboas)
    - Subfamily: Allactaginae
      - Genus: Allactaga
        - Great jerboa, Allactaga major
        - Severtzov's jerboa, Allactaga severtzovi
        - Vinogradov's jerboa, Allactaga vinogradovi
      - Genus: Allactodipus
        - Bobrinski's jerboa, Allactodipus bobrinskii
    - Subfamily: Cardiocraniinae
      - Genus: Salpingotus
        - Heptner's pygmy jerboa, Salpingotus heptneri
    - Subfamily: Dipodinae
      - Genus: Dipus
        - Northern three-toed jerboa, Dipus sagitta
      - Genus: Eremodipus
        - Lichtenstein's jerboa, Eremodipus lichtensteini
      - Genus: Jaculus
        - Turkmen jerboa, Jaculus turcmenicus
      - Genus: Paradipus
        - Comb-toed jerboa, Paradipus ctenodactylus
      - Genus: Stylodipus
        - Thick-tailed three-toed jerboa, Stylodipus telum
  - Family: Cricetidae
    - Subfamily: Arvicolinae
      - Genus: Blanfordimys
        - Afghan vole, Blanfordimys afghanus
      - Genus: Ellobius
        - Zaisan mole vole, Ellobius tancrei
  - Family: Muridae (mice, rats, voles, gerbils, hamsters)
    - Subfamily: Gerbillinae
      - Genus: Meriones
        - Libyan jird, Meriones libycus LC
        - Midday jird, Meriones meridianus
        - Tamarisk jird, Meriones tamariscinus
    - Subfamily: Murinae
      - Genus: Nesokia
        - Short-tailed bandicoot rat, Nesokia indica LC

== Order: Lagomorpha (lagomorphs) ==
The lagomorphs comprise two families, Leporidae with hares and rabbits, and Ochotonidae with pikas. Though they can resemble rodents, and were classified as a superfamily in that order until the early 20th century, they have since been considered a separate order.

- Family: Leporidae
  - Genus: Lepus
    - Tolai hare, L. tolai LC
- Family: Ochotonidae
  - Genus: Ochotona
    - Turkestan red pika, O. rutila LC

== Order: Erinaceomorpha (hedgehogs and gymnures) ==
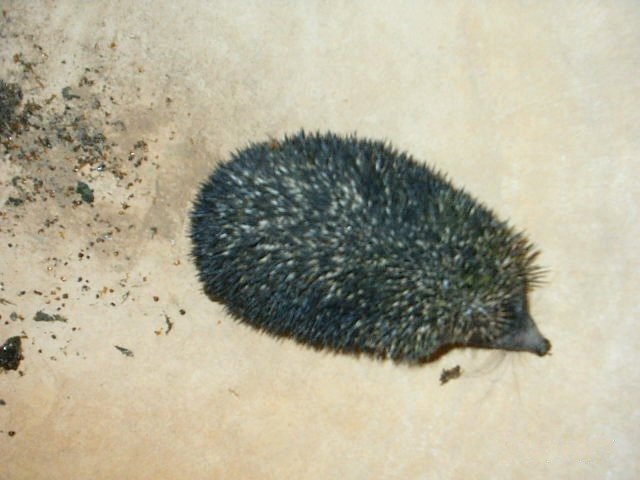
Brandt's hedgehog

The order Erinaceomorpha contains a single family, Erinaceidae, which comprise the hedgehogs and gymnures. The hedgehogs are easily recognised by their spines while gymnures look more like large rats.

- Family: Erinaceidae (hedgehogs)
  - Subfamily: Erinaceinae
    - Genus: Hemiechinus
      - Long-eared hedgehog, H. auritus LC
    - Genus: Paraechinus
      - Brandt's hedgehog, P. hypomelas LC

== Order: Soricomorpha (shrews, moles, and solenodons) ==
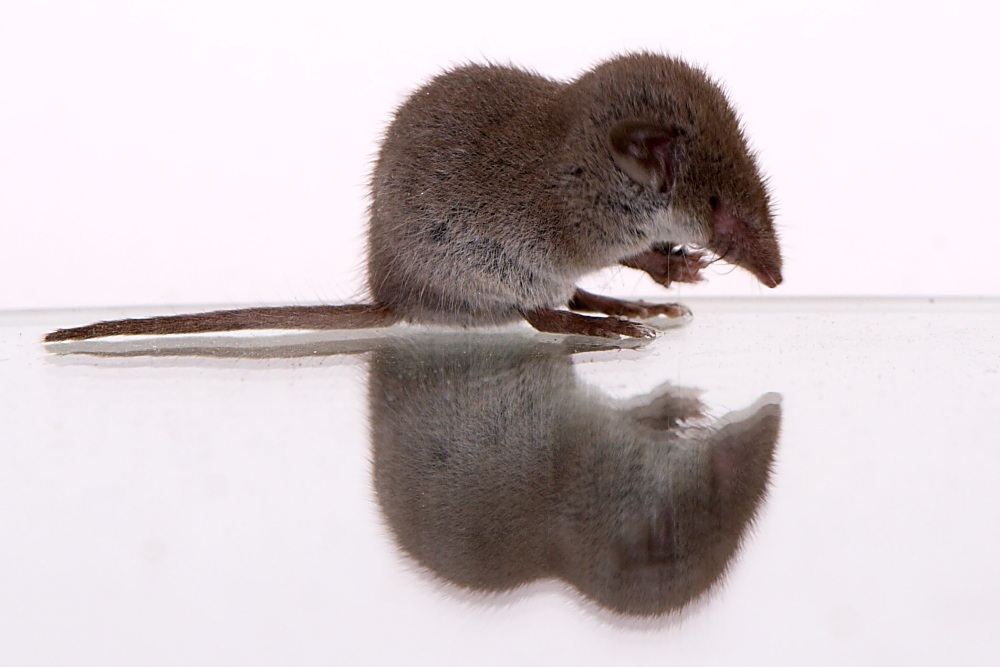
Lesser white-toothed shrew

The "shrew-forms" are insectivorous mammals. The shrews and solenodons closely resemble mice while the moles are stout-bodied burrowers.

- Family: Soricidae (shrews)
  - Subfamily: Crocidurinae
    - Genus: Crocidura
      - Gueldenstaedt's shrew, C. gueldenstaedtii LC
      - Lesser white-toothed shrew, C. suaveolens LC
    - Genus: Diplomesodon
      - Piebald shrew, D. pulchellum LC
  - Subfamily: Soricinae
    - Tribe: Soricini
      - Genus: Sorex
        - Eurasian pygmy shrew, S. minutus LC

== Order: Chiroptera (bats) ==
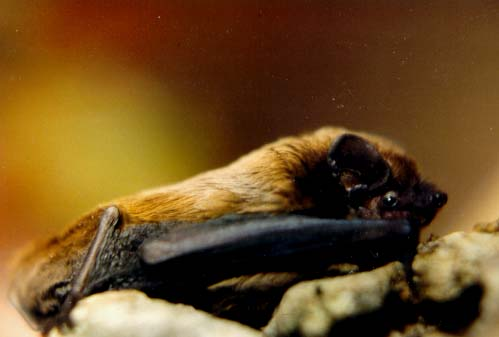
Lesser noctule

The bats' most distinguishing feature is that their forelimbs are developed as wings, making them the only mammals capable of flight. Bat species account for about 20% of all mammals.

- Family: Vespertilionidae
  - Subfamily: Myotinae
    - Genus: Myotis
      - Long-fingered bat, M. capaccinii VU
      - Geoffroy's bat, M. emarginatus LC
      - Fraternal myotis, M. frater LC
      - Bokhara whiskered bat, M. bucharensis DD
  - Subfamily: Vespertilioninae
    - Genus: Eptesicus
      - Bobrinski's serotine, E. bobrinskoi LC
      - Botta's serotine, E. bottae LC
      - Serotine, E. serotinus LC
    - Genus: Nyctalus
      - Greater noctule bat, N. lasiopterus NT
      - Lesser noctule, N. leisleri LC
- Family: Rhinolophidae
  - Subfamily: Rhinolophinae
    - Genus: Rhinolophus
      - Bokhara horseshoe bat, R. bocharicus LC
      - Greater horseshoe bat, R. ferrumequinum LC
      - Lesser horseshoe bat, R. hipposideros LC

== Order: Carnivora (carnivorans) ==
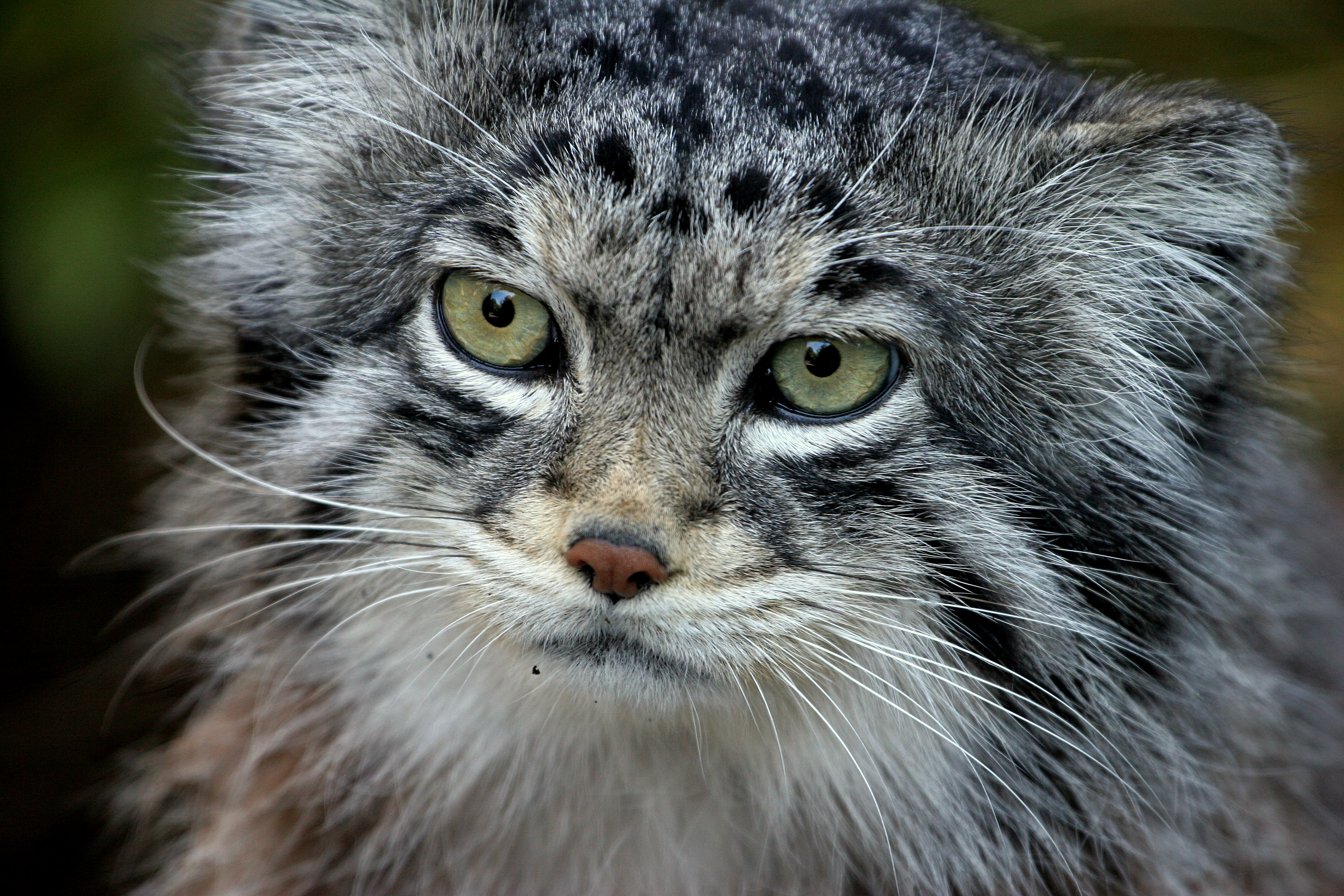
Pallas's cat

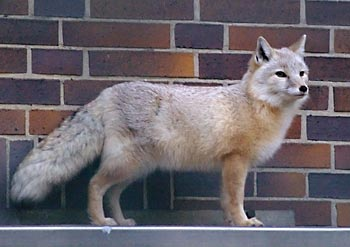
Corsac fox

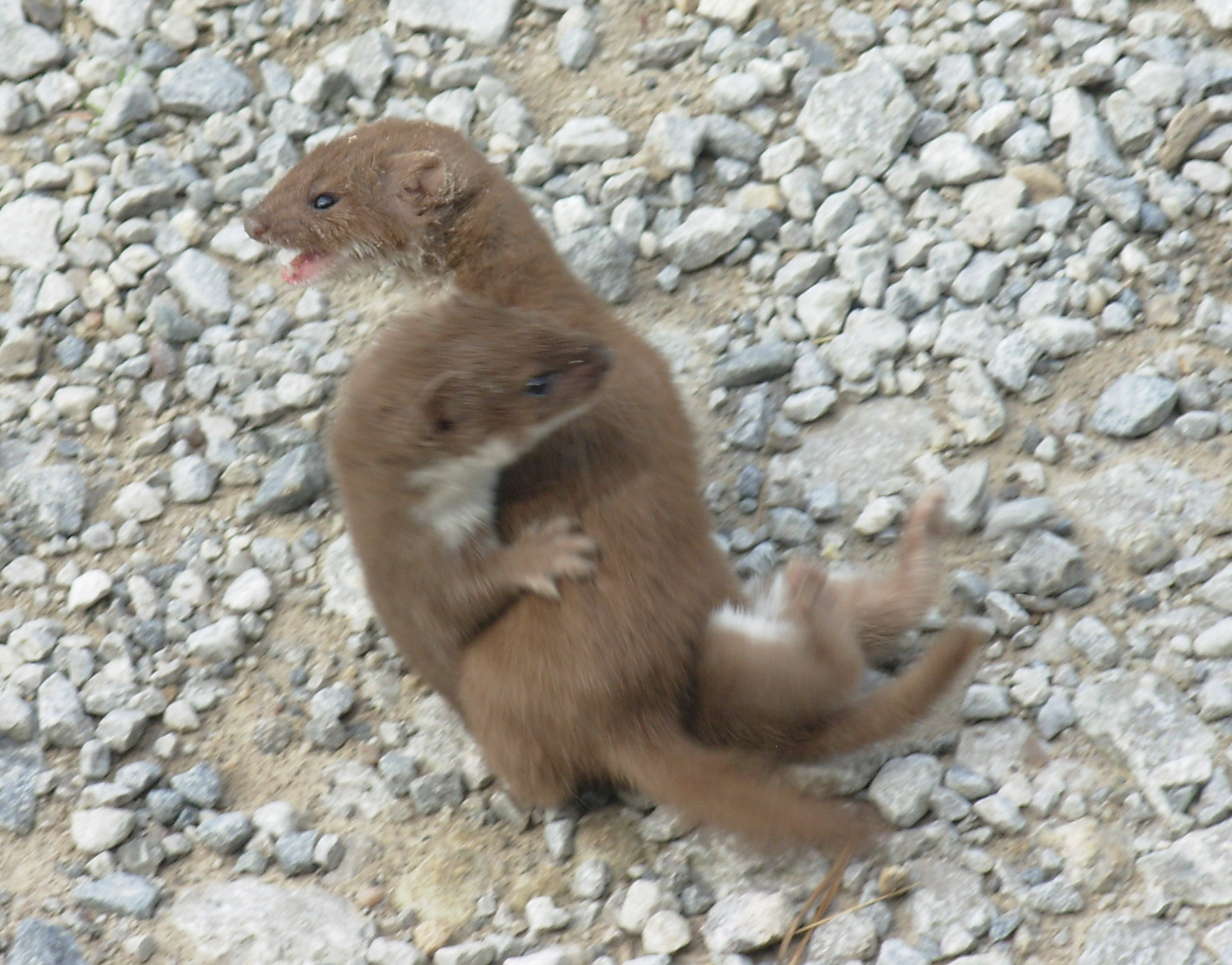
Least weasel

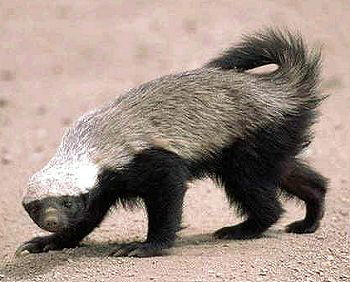
Honey badger

There are over 260 species of carnivorans, the majority of which feed primarily on meat. They have a characteristic skull shape and dentition.

- Suborder: Feliformia
  - Family: Felidae (cats)
    - Subfamily: Felinae
      - Genus: Caracal
        - Caracal, C. caracal LC
      - Genus: Felis
        - Jungle cat, F. chaus LC
        - African wildcat, F. lybica LC
          - Asiatic wildcat, F. l. ornata
        - Sand cat, F. margarita LC
      - Genus: Lynx
        - Eurasian lynx, L. lynx LC
      - Genus: Otocolobus
        - Pallas's cat, O. manul LC
    - Subfamily: Pantherinae
      - Genus: Panthera
        - Snow leopard, P. uncia VU
  - Family: Hyaenidae (hyaenas)
    - Genus: Hyaena
      - Striped hyena, H. hyaena NT
- Suborder: Caniformia
  - Family: Canidae (dogs, foxes)
    - Genus: Canis
      - Golden jackal, C. aureus LC
      - Gray wolf, C. lupus LC
    - Genus: Vulpes
      - Corsac fox, V. corsac LC
      - Red fox, V. vulpes LC
  - Family: Ursidae (bears)
    - Genus: Ursus
      - Brown bear, U. arctos LC
  - Family: Mustelidae (mustelids)
    - Genus: Lutra
      - Eurasian otter, L. lutra NT
    - Genus: Meles
      - Asian badger, M. leucurus LC
    - Genus: Mustela
      - Stoat, M. erminea LC
      - Steppe polecat, M. eversmannii LC
      - Least weasel, M. nivalis LC
    - Genus: Vormela
      - Marbled polecat, V. peregusna VU

== Order: Perissodactyla (odd-toed ungulates) ==
The odd-toed ungulates are browsing and grazing mammals. They are usually large to very large, and have relatively simple stomachs and a large middle toe.

- Family: Equidae (horses etc.)
  - Genus: Equus
    - Onager, E. hemionus NT
      - Turkmenian kulan, E. h. kulan EN

== Order: Artiodactyla (even-toed ungulates) ==
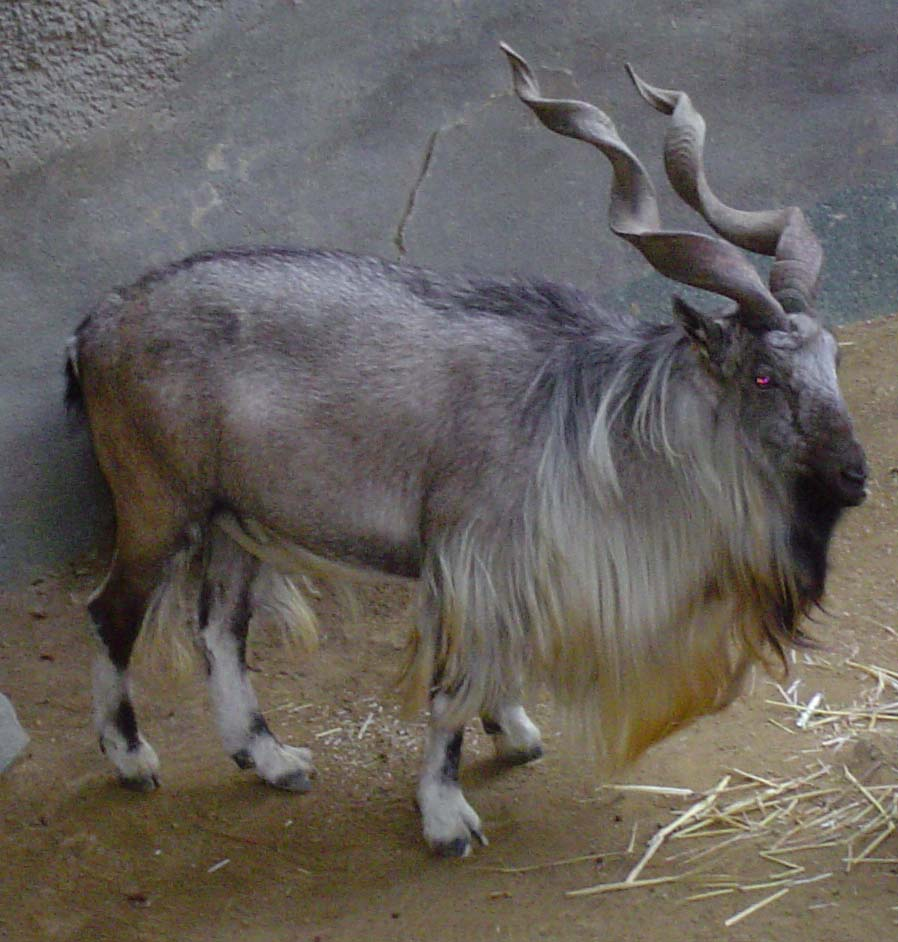
Markhor

The even-toed ungulates are ungulates whose weight is borne about equally by the third and fourth toes, rather than mostly or entirely by the third as in perissodactyls. There are about 220 artiodactyl species, including many that are of great economic importance to humans.

- Family: Cervidae (deer)
  - Subfamily: Cervinae
    - Genus: Cervus
      - Central Asian red deer C. hanglu LC
        - Bactrian deer, C. h. bactrianus
- Family: Bovidae (cattle, antelope, sheep, goats)
  - Subfamily: Antilopinae
    - Genus: Gazella
      - Goitered gazelle, G. subgutturosa VU
    - Genus: Saiga
      - Saiga antelope, S. tatarica NT
  - Subfamily: Caprinae
    - Genus: Capra
      - Markhor, C. falconeri NT
      - Siberian ibex, C. sibirica NT
    - Genus: Ovis
      - Argali, O. ammon NT
      - Urial, O. vignei VU

== Locally extinct ==
The following species are locally extinct in Uzbekistan:

- Cheetah, Acinonyx jubatus
- Dhole, Cuon alpinus
- Leopard, Panthera pardus
- Tiger, Panthera tigris

== See also ==
- List of chordate orders
- Lists of mammals by region
- Mammal classification
