= Bocharic myotis =

Conservation status
- Data Deficient (IUCN 3.1)

Scientific classification
- Kingdom: Animalia
- Phylum: Chordata
- Class: Mammalia
- Order: Chiroptera
- Family: Vespertilionidae
- Genus: Myotis
- Species: M. bucharensis

Binomial name
- Myotis bucharensis Kuzyakin, 1950
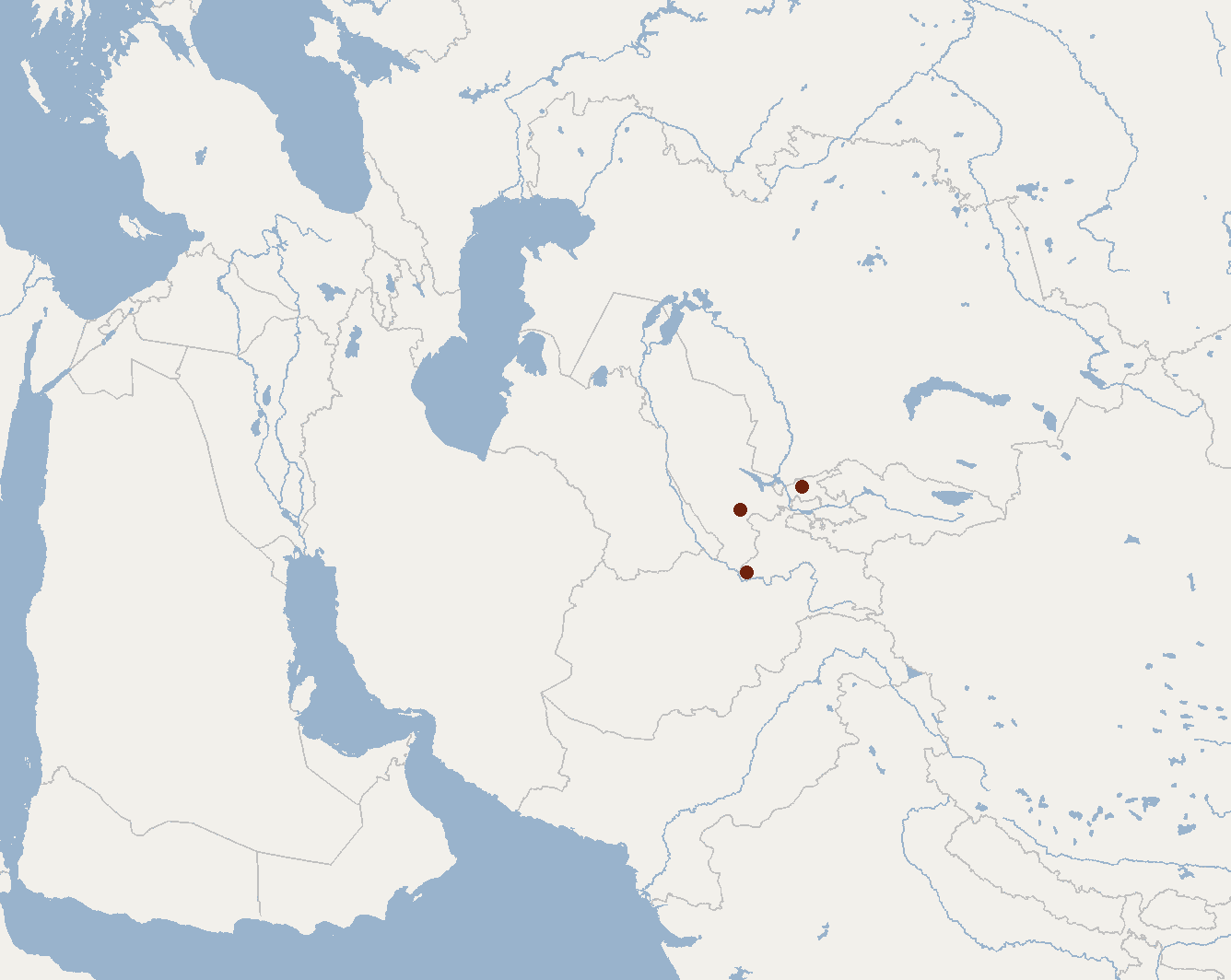

Species of bat

The Bocharic myotis or Bokhara whiskered bat (Myotis bucharensis) is a species of mouse-eared bat in the family Vespertilionidae, described in 1950, and indigenous to Tajikistan, and Uzbekistan.

== Taxonomy ==
The Bocharic myotis was described as a new subspecies of Myotis longicaudatus in 1950 by Alexander Petrovitch Kuzyakin (also known as Aleksandr Petrovich Kuzâkin). The holotype had been collected near Kurgan-Tjubinskaja in Tajikistan. When M. longicaudatus was later recognized as a synonym of the fraternal myotis, the Bocharic myotis had a trinomen of Myotis frater bucharensis. Publications in 2000 and 2001 reasserted its status as a full species rather than a subspecies, however. Based on the analysis of two genes, one nuclear and one mitochondrial, the Bocharic myotis is part of a species complex including the fraternal myotis. Its sister taxon is likely the long-tailed myotis (M. longicaudatus).

== Range ==
The Bocharic myotis is only known from Central Asia. The species was first documented in Tajikistan; between 1959 and 1963, four individuals were documented near Samarqand and Tashkent, Uzbekistan. It has been speculated that it may also occur in Afghanistan and Kyrgyzstan.

== Conservation ==
Since investigators failed to locate the species during field trips in the 1970s and 1980s, the International Union for Conservation of Nature suggested that M. bucharensis was potentially extinct in Tajikistan and Uzbekistan. In 2019, a male Bocharic myotis was captured near the Zeravshan river in Tajikistan, confirming that the species is still present there.

== See also ==
- List of mammals of Afghanistan
- List of mammals of Kyrgyzstan
- List of mammals of Tajikistan
- List of mammals of Uzbekistan
