= Long-tailed bat =

Long-tailed bat may refer to:

- New Zealand long-tailed bat (Chalinolobus tuberculatus)
- Myotis frater from Central and East Asia
- Choeroniscus (several species) from Central and South America
- Rhinopoma (several species) from Africa and Asia
