= Long-tailed myotis =

Conservation status
- Least Concern (IUCN 3.1)

Scientific classification
- Kingdom: Animalia
- Phylum: Chordata
- Class: Mammalia
- Infraclass: Placentalia
- Order: Chiroptera
- Family: Vespertilionidae
- Genus: Myotis
- Species: M. longicaudatus

Binomial name
- Myotis longicaudatus Ognev, 1927
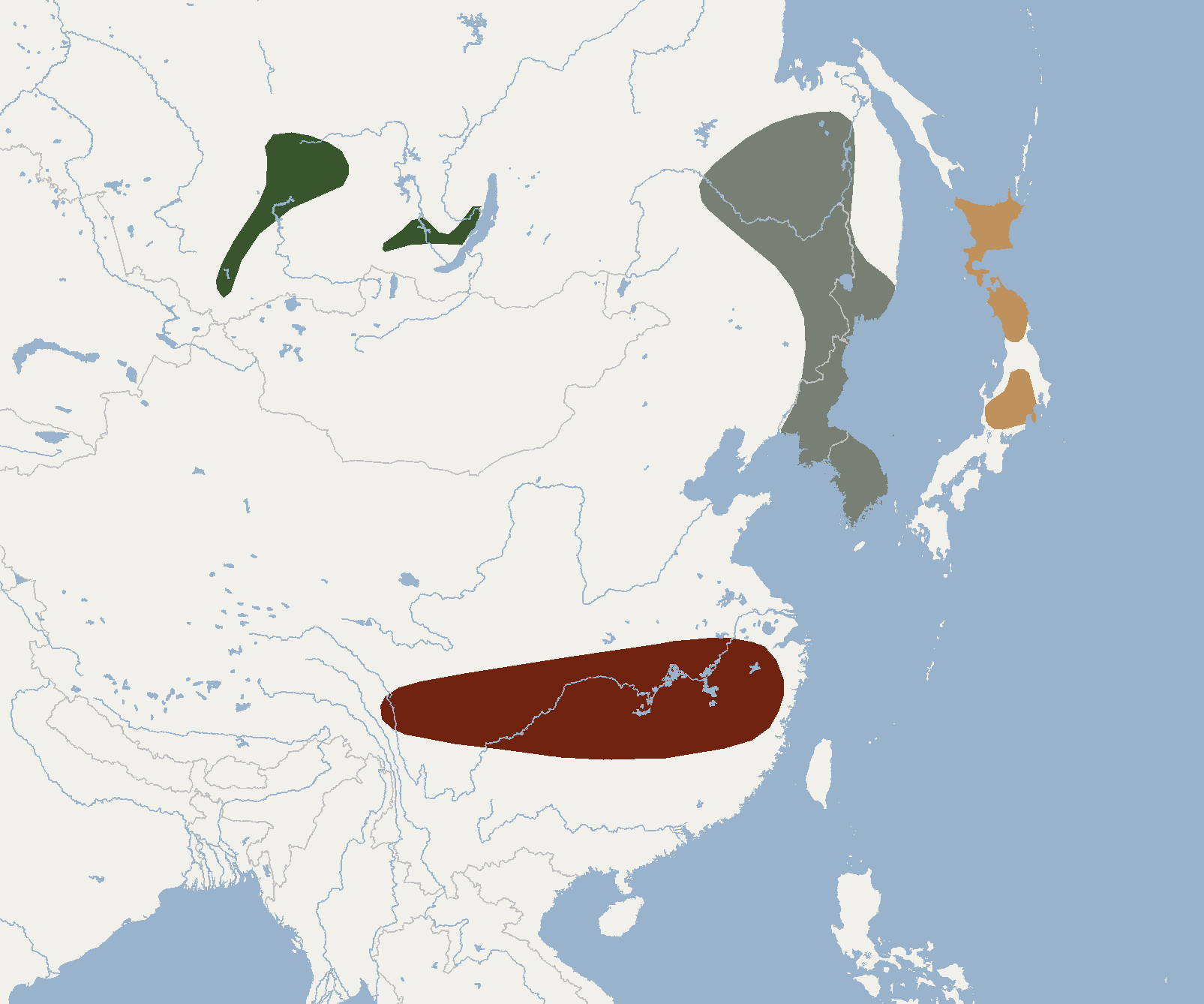
- M. longicaudatus subspecies: M. l. eniseensis M. l. longicaudatus M. l. kaguyae

Synonyms
- Myotis frater longicaudatus

Species of vesper bat

The long-tailed myotis (Myotis longicaudatus) is a species of vesper bat found in northern and eastern Asia.

== Taxonomy ==
Previously thought to be a subspecies of the fraternal myotis (M. frater), it was split as a distinct species by a 2015 study based on molecular evidence. This has also been followed by the American Society of Mammalogists, the IUCN Red List, and the ITIS. The study found it to be basal to a clade containing M. frater, the reddish myotis (M. soror), and Daubenton's bat (M. daubentonii). Other studies have also recovered the Bocharic myotis (M. bucharensis) as its sister species.

== Distribution and habitat ==
It has a wide distribution across North Asia and East Asia east of the Altai Mountains, from southern Siberia and Mongolia south to Korea and Japan. It is found in a wide range of habitats, both natural and artificial, and is thus considered a generalist species. In Japan, it has been observed roosting in tree cavities, tunnels, bridges, and buildings. It has been observed foraging along streets in Hokkaido.

== Description ==
It is a relatively small bat with dark brown wings. Its hind legs are slightly longer than other Myotis species, and the tail length is similar to the head-to-body length. Its pelage is dorsally dark brown and ventrally dark ivory. Its ears are short, dark brown in color, and have a pointed tragus.

== Behavior ==
During the summer, this species may sometimes share roosting caves with the eastern water bat (M. petax); however, both species hibernate separately during the winter.

== Status ==
Due to its wide range and generalist nature, it is not thought to have any major threats. However, it may be threatened by roadkills in Hokkaido, and in general may be at risk from forest degradation and disturbances to roosting sites. Despite a wide distribution, it is a naturally rare species.
