= Reddish myotis =

Conservation status
- Data Deficient (IUCN 3.1)

Scientific classification
- Kingdom: Animalia
- Phylum: Chordata
- Class: Mammalia
- Order: Chiroptera
- Family: Vespertilionidae
- Genus: Myotis
- Species: M. soror

Binomial name
- Myotis soror Ruedi, Csorba, Lin, & Chou, 2015

Species of mammal

The reddish myotis (Myotis soror) is a species of vesper bat. It is endemic to Taiwan.

It was first discovered to science in 2003, and described in a 2015 study of the phylogenetics of Myotis bats of Taiwan and eastern China. It is thought to be most closely related to the fraternal myotis (M. frater), and its specific epithet, soror, references this, with frater meaning "brother" and soror meaning "sister" in Latin. As its name suggests, it has a striking cinnamon-brown pelage with golden-brown hair tips.

It is only known from temperate evergreen forests in the Central Mountain Range. It may be a very rare forest-dwelling species, explaining its rarity in studies. Due to this rarity, it is classified as Data Deficient on the IUCN Red List.
