= Bucharian vole =

Conservation status
- Least Concern (IUCN 3.1)

Scientific classification
- Kingdom: Animalia
- Phylum: Chordata
- Class: Mammalia
- Order: Rodentia
- Family: Cricetidae
- Subfamily: Arvicolinae
- Genus: Microtus
- Subgenus: Blanfordimys
- Species: M. bucharensis

Binomial name
- Microtus bucharensis Vinogradov, 1930

Synonyms
- Blanfordimys bucharensis (Vinogradov, 1930); Blanfordimys bucharicus (Vinogradov, 1930) [orth. error]

Species of rodent

The Bucharian vole (Microtus bucharensis) is a species of rodent in the family Cricetidae. It is found in Afghanistan, Tajikistan, Uzbekistan, and Turkmenistan. Its natural habitat is temperate desert.

== Taxonomy ==
Two subspecies of the Bucharian vole are recognized:

M. b. bucharensis, described by Vinogradov in 1930, and M. b. davydovi, described by Golenishchev and Sablina in 1991. M. b. bucharensis is distributed across eastern Uzbekistan (Navoiy, Samarqand, Jizzakh, and Qashqadaryo regions) and northwestern Tajikistan (Sughd Region).

M. b. davydovi occurs in southeastern Uzbekistan (Surxondaryo Region), eastern Turkmenistan (Kugitang Mountains), and southwestern Tajikistan (Karategin and northwestern Khatlon regions).

== Description ==
It is a small rodent characterized by a compact, rounded body, short tail, and small, rounded ears and is pale brownish-gray to gray on the upperparts, while the underparts are whitish. Its body length can be up to 12.7 cm (5.0 in), but generally between 9 and 12 cm (3.5 and 4.7 in) with an average tail length of 34 mm (1.3 in), varying between 2 and 4 cm (0.79 and 1.57 in). It normally weighs 20 to 40 g (0.71 to 1.41 oz) but can reach 53 g (1.9 oz). It has minimal sexual dimorphism, both males and females present similar body sizes and coloration. The tail is relatively short, measuring approximately 25% of the head-body length, and is light in color with a faintly bicolored appearance.

The Bucharian vole can be distinguished from closely related Microtus species through specific anatomical characteristics especially skull morphology, dental patterns, and reproductive structures. Notable features include large, inflated auditory bullae (hollow, bubble-like bony structure located on the ventral (underside) and posterior portion of the skull in most mammals that encloses parts of the middle and inner ear), six plantar pads on the soles of the feet, and distinctive molar structures with a relatively long baculum and a broad base and short median and lateral processes. Additionally, the species has a diploid chromosome number of 48 (2n = 48) and a fundamental number of 54 (FN = 54).

== Habitat and distribution ==
This palearctic vole is found mostly throughout temperate desert and shrubland across the region of Tajikistan south of the Fergana Valley, mainly in Bukhara-Gissar region (another way to tell it apart from related species) and in neighbouring regions of Uzbekistan, Turkmenistan and Afghanistan. One source lists it as endemic to Tajikistan. They live mainly in rocky outcrops, alpine meadows, and scrubby mountain and hill slopes with grasses and low vegetation, preferably near water sources within their semi-arid ranges. They use talus slopes to evade predators and extreme weather.

== Behaviour ==
The Bucharian vole lives primarily in large colonies or family groups, with each colony occupying a complex burrow system that includes nesting chambers and interconnected tunnels at varying depths. It is active throughout the day and night, although activity may vary with environmental conditions and as a rule is it crepuscular (active at dawn and dusk). Its feeds mainly on green plant parts, grasses, and seeds, making it an important primary consumer and distributor in its mountain ecosystem. It also serves as a food source for predators such as birds of prey, snakes, and small carnivores.

Breeding occurs mainly between January and May, with peak activity in February and March. Females typically produce 2 litters per year, each containing 3–6 young. Females primarily care for and nurse their offspring until weaning, which likely occurs within a few weeks, while sexual maturity is reached at approximately 1–2 months and wild individuals have an estimated lifespan of 1–2 years due to predation pressure. The species' burrowing and feeding activities contribute to its ecological role, while its colonies may compete with other small rodents for available food and habitat resources. They communicate by scent marking of territories and burrows, some vocalizations and body posture.

== Conservation ==
The species is listed as "Least Concern" by the IUCN on the Red List, but it's numbers, population trends and other key details are largely unknown.
