= Juniper vole =

Conservation status
- Least Concern (IUCN 3.1)

Scientific classification
- Kingdom: Animalia
- Phylum: Chordata
- Class: Mammalia
- Infraclass: Placentalia
- Order: Rodentia
- Family: Cricetidae
- Subfamily: Arvicolinae
- Genus: Microtus
- Subgenus: Blanfordimys
- Species: M. yuldaschi

Binomial name
- Microtus yuldaschi (Severtzov, 1879)

Synonyms
- Microtus juldaschi (Severtzov, 1879); Arvicola juldaschi Severtzov, 1879; Neodon juldaschi (Severtzov, 1879)

Species of rodent

The juniper vole (Microtus yuldaschi) is a species of rodent in the family Cricetidae. It is found in Afghanistan, China, Pakistan and Tajikistan. It was formerly classified in the genus Neodon, but genetic evidence supports classifying it within the subgenus Blanfordimys in Microtus.
