= Microtus (Blanfordimys) =

Scientific classification
- Kingdom: Animalia
- Phylum: Chordata
- Class: Mammalia
- Order: Rodentia
- Family: Cricetidae
- Subfamily: Arvicolinae
- Genus: Microtus
- Subgenus: Blanfordimys; Argyropulo, 1933

Species
- Microtus afghanus Microtus bucharensis Microtus yuldaschi

Genus of rodents

Blanfordimys is a subgenus of voles in the genus Microtus. It was formerly considered a distinct genus, but taxonomic studies group it within the Microtus radiation.

It contains the following species:

- Afghan vole (Microtus afghanus)
- Bucharian vole (Microtus bucharensis)
- Juniper vole (Microtus yuldaschi)
