= Afghan vole =

Conservation status
- Least Concern (IUCN 3.1)

Scientific classification
- Kingdom: Animalia
- Phylum: Chordata
- Class: Mammalia
- Order: Rodentia
- Family: Cricetidae
- Subfamily: Arvicolinae
- Genus: Microtus
- Subgenus: Blanfordimys
- Species: M. afghanus

Binomial name
- Microtus afghanus Thomas, 1912

Synonyms
- Blanfordimys afganensis Agadzhanyan and Yatsenko, 1984; Blanfordimys balchanensis (Heptner and Shukurov, 1950); Blanfordimys dangarinensis Golenishchev and Sablina, 1991 Blanfordimys afghanus

Species of rodent

The Afghan vole (Microtus afghanus) is a species of rodent in the family Cricetidae. It is found in south-central Asia.

== Characteristics ==
The Afghan vole has a small, stocky body, a blunt, rounded muzzle and rounded ears. The colour varies across its range from pale-yellow-ochre to grayish-yellow. The short tail is a similar colour and the underparts are creamy gray. A diploid set of chromosomes (2n=58) is characteristic of this species. The length of the body is 110 millimetres (4.3 in) with a tail of 30 millimetres (1.2 in). The foot is 16 millimetres (5/8 in) long and usually has six sole pads though there are occasionally five.

== Distribution ==
This species is widely distributed in semi-desert, steppes and mountainous areas of southern Turkmenistan, southern Uzbekistan, northeastern Iran, Tajikistan and central Afghanistan, where it has been recorded at up to 3,400 metres (11,150 ft). In most of its distribution area it lives at heights of 500–600 metres (1,640–1,970 ft) above sea level but occasionally up to 1,700 metres (5,580 ft).

== Ecology ==
This vole favours fallow and dry lands, rough grassland and scrub. It mainly eats the green parts of plants but also feeds on seeds, fruits, flowers and roots. It stores food supplies of up to 4.5 kilograms (9.9 lb) for winter use. It is a colonial species and forms complex burrows. These can cover as much as 180 square metres (1,900 sq ft) with the number of entrance holes varying from 20 to 145 and number of voles from four to ten individuals. Reproduction occurs in the autumn, winter and spring with a pause during summer drought. Litter sizes vary from one to ten and in some years, population sizes can increase substantially.
