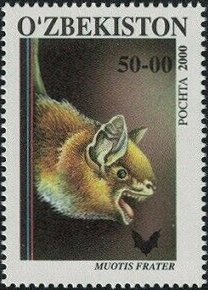
- on stamp from Uzbekistan

Conservation status
- Least Concern (IUCN 3.1)

Scientific classification
- Kingdom: Animalia
- Phylum: Chordata
- Class: Mammalia
- Order: Chiroptera
- Family: Vespertilionidae
- Genus: Myotis
- Species: M. frater

Binomial name
- Myotis frater (G.M. Allen, 1923)
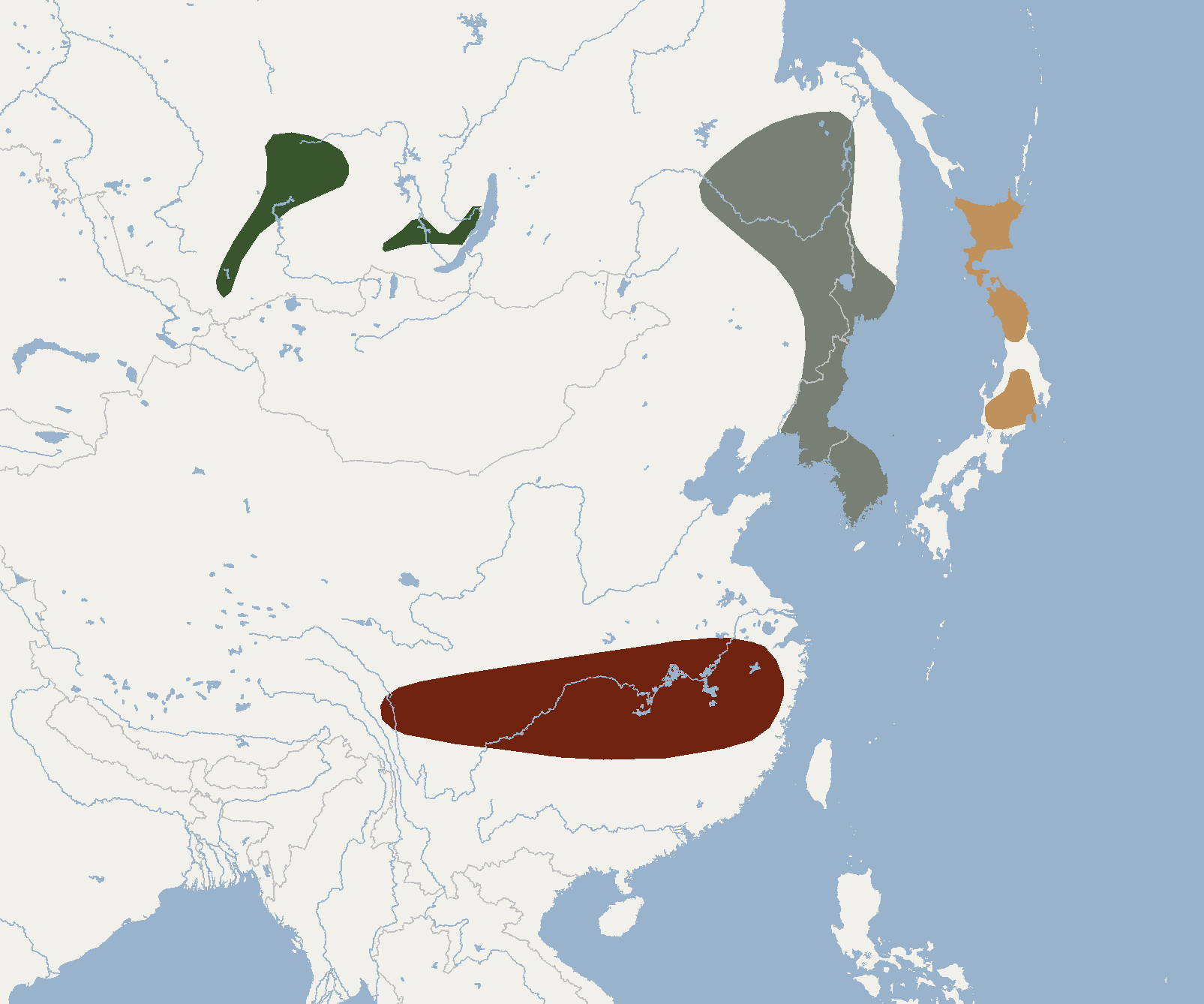
- Fraternal myotis range in red (does not include Taiwan range)

= Fraternal myotis =

Species of bat

The fraternal myotis (Myotis frater) is a species of vesper bat native to East Asia.

== Taxonomy ==
The long-tailed myotis (M. longicaudatus) was split as a distinct species by a 2015 study based on molecular evidence. This has also been followed by the American Society of Mammalogists, the IUCN Red List, and the ITIS. Phylogenetic evidence supports the reddish myotis (M. soror) of Taiwan being the sister species to M. frater.

== Description ==
An adult fraternal myotis has a body length of about 5 cm (2 in), a tail of about 4.5 cm (2 in), and a forearm length of about 3.8 cm (1 in).

== Distribution ==
The species is found throughout China and Taiwan. Bats that could potentially belong to this species have also been collected in Uttarkhand, India, but their taxonomy remains unresolved.

== Status ==
There are no major threats to this species, although it may be threatened by roadkill in Taiwan. It may be sensitive to climate change, but this was based on the old classification that included M. longicaudatus within the species, and thus this remains unconfirmed.
