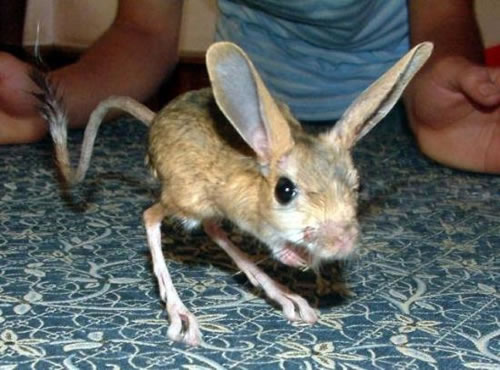

Conservation status
- Data Deficient (IUCN 3.1)

Scientific classification
- Kingdom: Animalia
- Phylum: Chordata
- Class: Mammalia
- Order: Rodentia
- Family: Dipodidae
- Genus: Scarturus
- Species: S. tetradactylus

Binomial name
- Scarturus tetradactylus (Lichtenstein, 1823)
- Geographic range

= Four-toed jerboa =

Species of mammal

The four-toed jerboa (Scarturus tetradactylus) is a rodent of the family Dipodidae and genus Scarturus that has four digits. Four-toed jerboas are native to Egypt and Libya, and thus the only species of Allactaginae found outside West and Central Asia. They live in coastal salt marshes and dry deserts.

== Physical appearance ==
Similar to the other jerboas in the genera Allactaga and Scarturus, the four-toed jerboa are small hopping rodents with large ears and a long tail, with a black band near the white, feathery tip. The tail assists and serves as support when the jerboa is standing upright. They have long hind feet and short forelegs. The pelt of the four-toed jerboa is velvety in texture and the upper-parts are speckled black and orange, the rump orange, and the sides gray. The four-toed jerboa hind-limbs have one digit less than other jerboas in the subfamily Allactaginae, but one more hind digit than other jerboas. The extra digit is smaller in size and nonfunctional compared to the other three digits.

== Nutrition ==
Emerging at night, the four-toed jerboa eats grass, leaves, and soft seeds. The low crown molars and soft palates help the four-toed jerboa chew plant material and seeds.

The four-toed jerboa is a host of the acanthocephalan intestinal parasite Moniliformis aegyptiacus.

== Conservation status ==
The four-toed jerboa was listed as on the IUCN Red List of Threatened Species. They are at very high risk of extinction due to habitat loss and restricted range.
