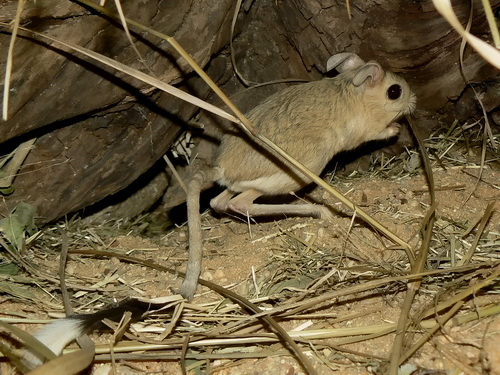

Conservation status
- Least Concern (IUCN 3.1)

Scientific classification
- Kingdom: Animalia
- Phylum: Chordata
- Class: Mammalia
- Order: Rodentia
- Family: Dipodidae
- Genus: Scarturus
- Species: S. elater

Binomial name
- Scarturus elater (H. Lichtenstein, 1825)
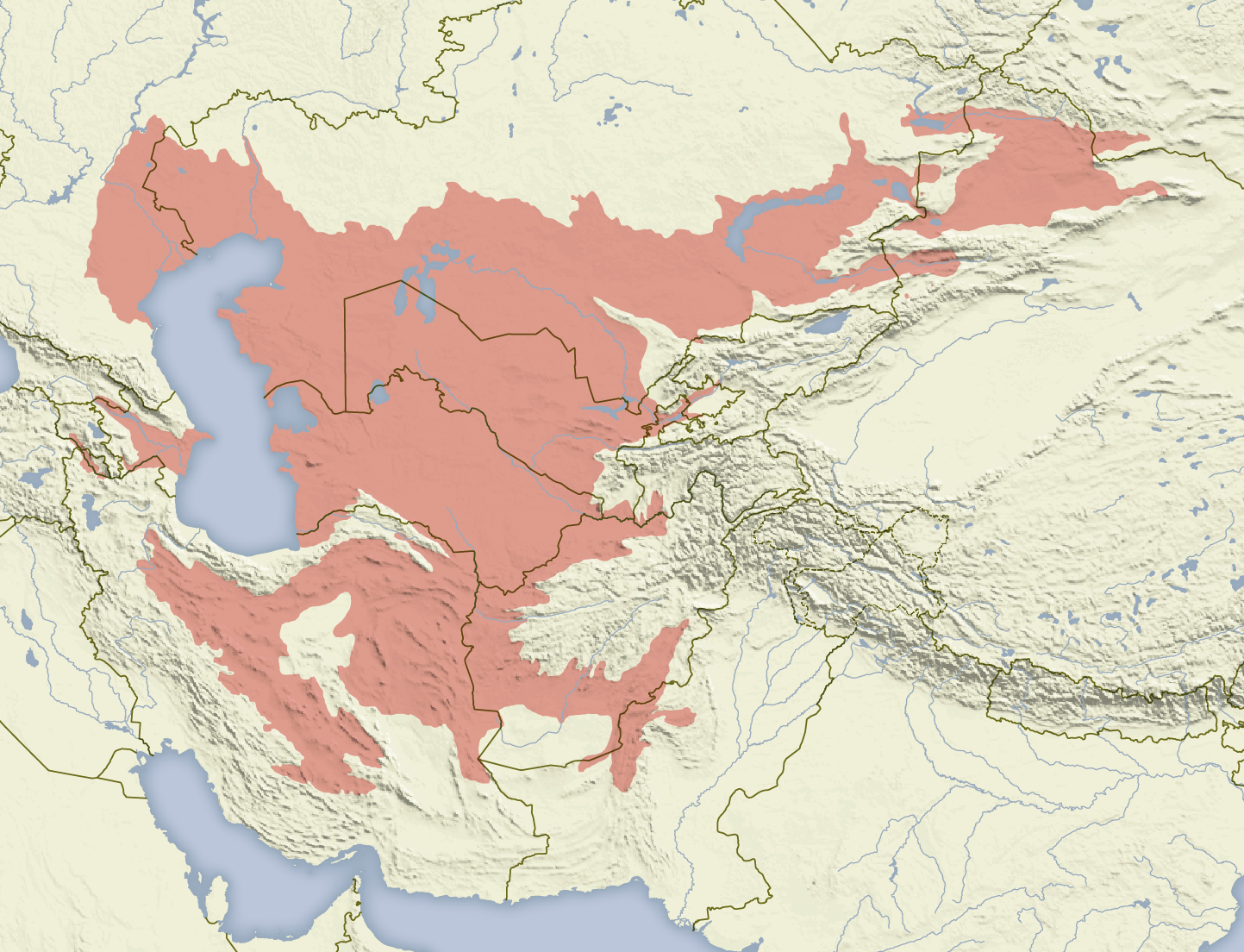
- Small five-toed jerboa range map

Synonyms
- List: Allactaga elater; Dipus elater

= Small five-toed jerboa =

Species of mammal

The small five-toed jerboa (Scarturus elater) is a rodent of the family Dipodidae and genus Scarturus, that has five digits. They are hopping rodents of the rocky deserts in Asia. They have been found in Afghanistan, Armenia, Azerbaijan, China, Georgia, Iran, Kazakhstan, Pakistan, Russia, Tajikistan, Turkey, and Turkmenistan. They have long hind feet, short forelimbs, and walk upright. The jerboa body length ranges from 5–15 cm and has a tail ranging from 7–25 cm. They have large ears in comparison to their body size and a large tail. The tail assists and serves as support when the jerboa is standing upright. These hopping rodents can reach a speed up to 48 km/h. The forelimbs of the jerboa serve as a pair of hands for feeding, grooming, etc. The male jerboa is usually larger in size and weight in comparison to the female jerboa. The pelt of the jerboa is either silky or velvety in texture and light in color, the coloration helps camouflage into surroundings to avoid predators. "Its coloration varies from sandy or buff to dark russet or black with pale under parts and a white strip on the hip”.

== Adaptation to temperature conditions ==
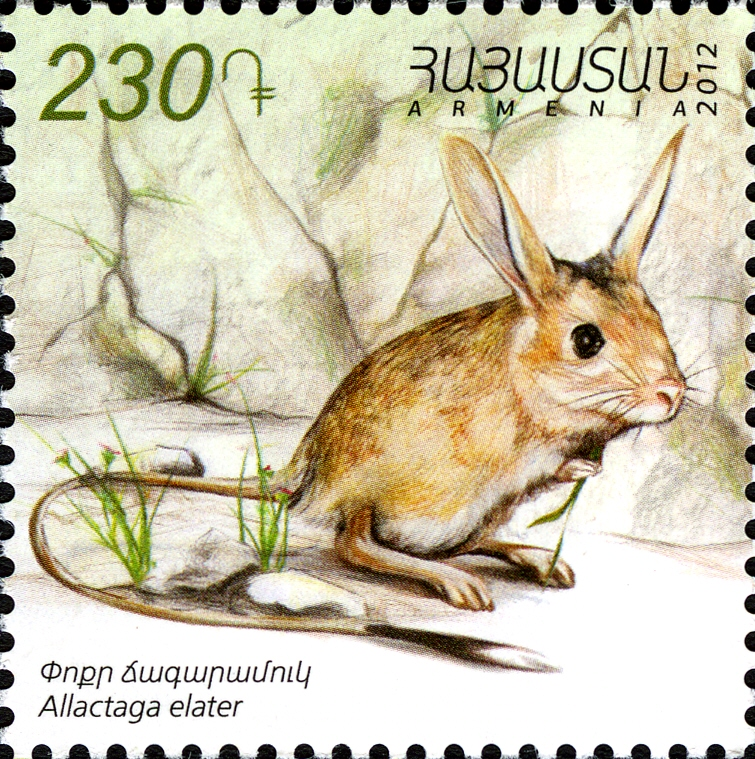
Allactaga elater on a 2012 Armenian stamp

Jerboas are adapted to live in the desert, therefore they are called xerocole animals. In hot temperature conditions, they spend most of their day burrowed under sand to avoid the heat. Burrowing under the sand, they evade the heat from the sun, minimizing water loss and avoiding dehydration. In cold temperature conditions, the Small five-toed Jerboa are capable of adjusting their body temperature 1–2 °C from the optimal temperature to minimize heat lost.
