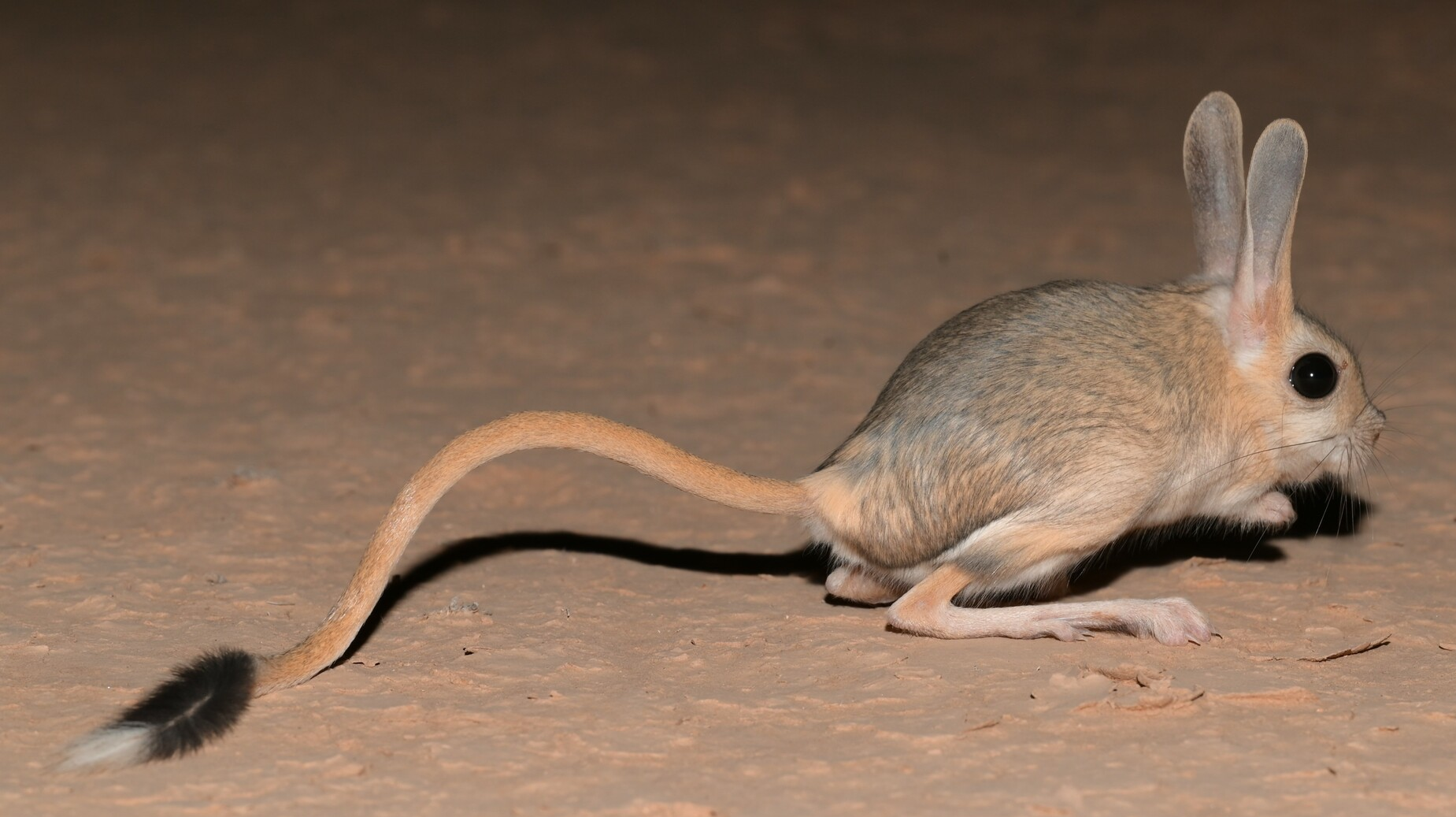
- Near Rafha, Saudi Arabia

Conservation status
- Least Concern (IUCN 3.1)

Scientific classification
- Kingdom: Animalia
- Phylum: Chordata
- Class: Mammalia
- Infraclass: Placentalia
- Order: Rodentia
- Family: Dipodidae
- Genus: Scarturus
- Species: S. euphraticus

Binomial name
- Scarturus euphraticus (Thomas, 1881)

Synonyms
- Allactaga euphraticus

= Euphrates jerboa =

Species of mammal

The Euphrates jerboa (Scarturus euphraticus) is a rodent of the family Dipodidae and genus Scarturus. They are characteristically known as hopping rodents. They have been found in Pakistan, Afghanistan, Iran, Iraq, Jordan, Kuwait, Saudi Arabia, Syria, Lebanon, and also occurs very marginally in southeastern Turkey. The Euphrates jerboa's natural habitats are subtropical or tropical dry lowland grassland, shrubland, and hot deserts.

== Description ==
Similar to the other jerboas in the genera Allactaga and Scarturus, Euphrates jerboas are small hopping rodents of desert regions and have large ears and a long tail. The tail assists and serves as support when the jerboa is standing upright. They have "long hind feet and short forelegs, and always walk upright". The forelimbs of the Euphrates jerboa serve as a pair of hands for feeding, grooming, etc. The male Euphrates jerboa is usually larger in size and weight in comparison to the female.

== Reproduction ==
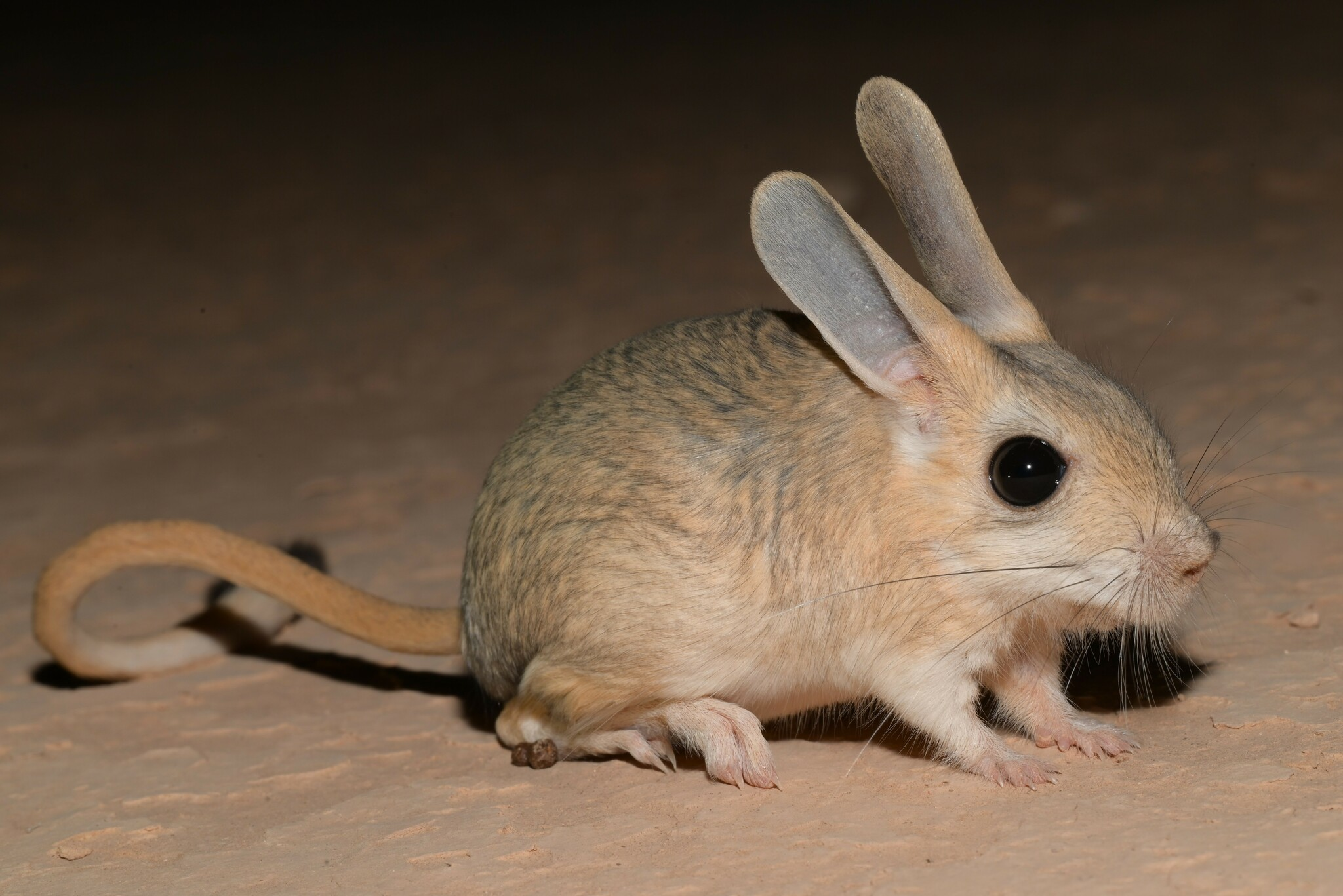
In Saudi Arabia

The Euphrates jerboa reproductive activity depends on the seasons. Females may give birth to up to nine young. In Turkey, breeding season spans from March to July. In Iraq, breeding season ranges from February to May. It is possible for the female to have three litters per year. The Euphrates jerboa is born an average weight of 2.74 grams.

== Conservation status ==
The Euphrates jerboa was listed on the Least Concern List by the IUCN Red List.

== Gallery ==
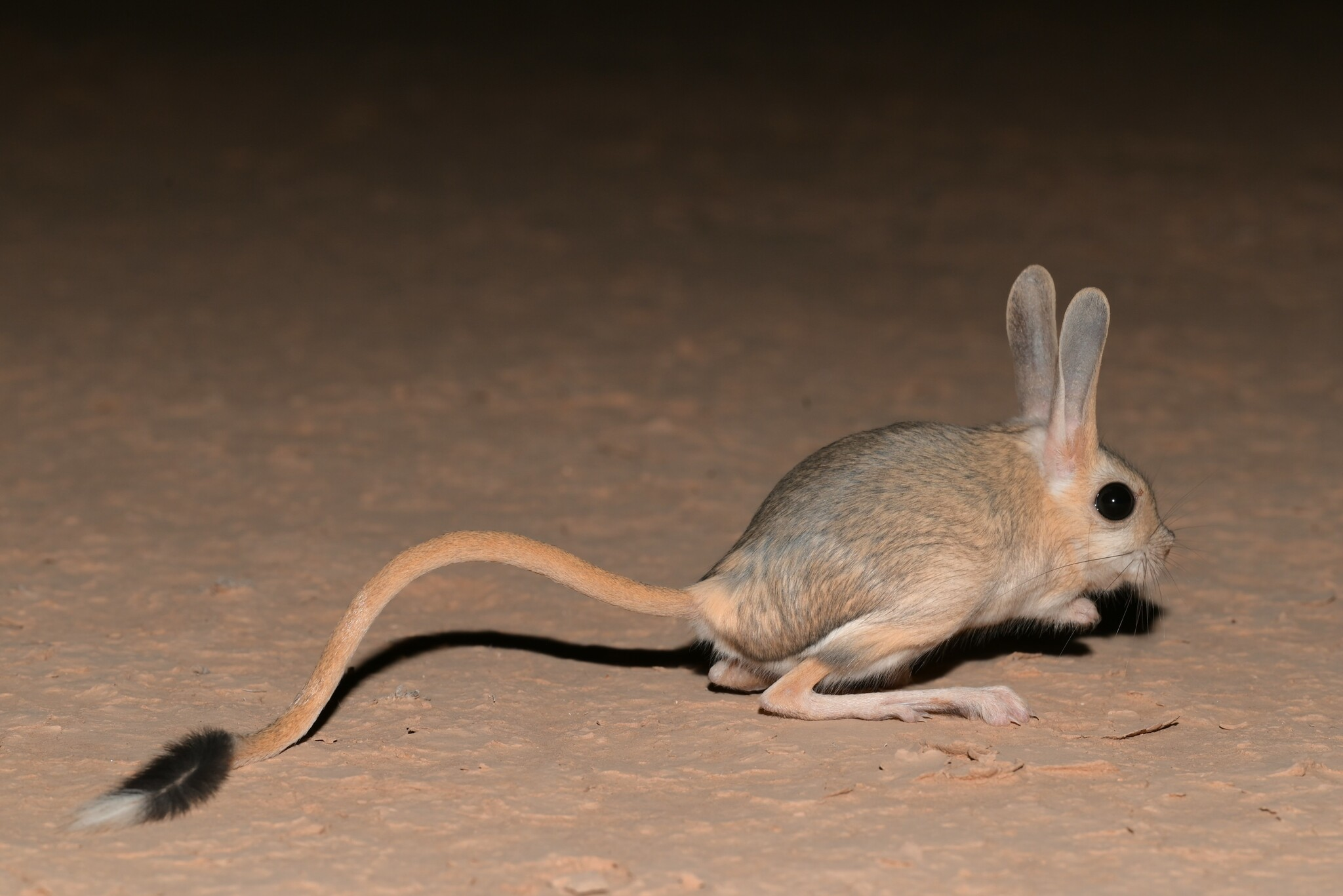

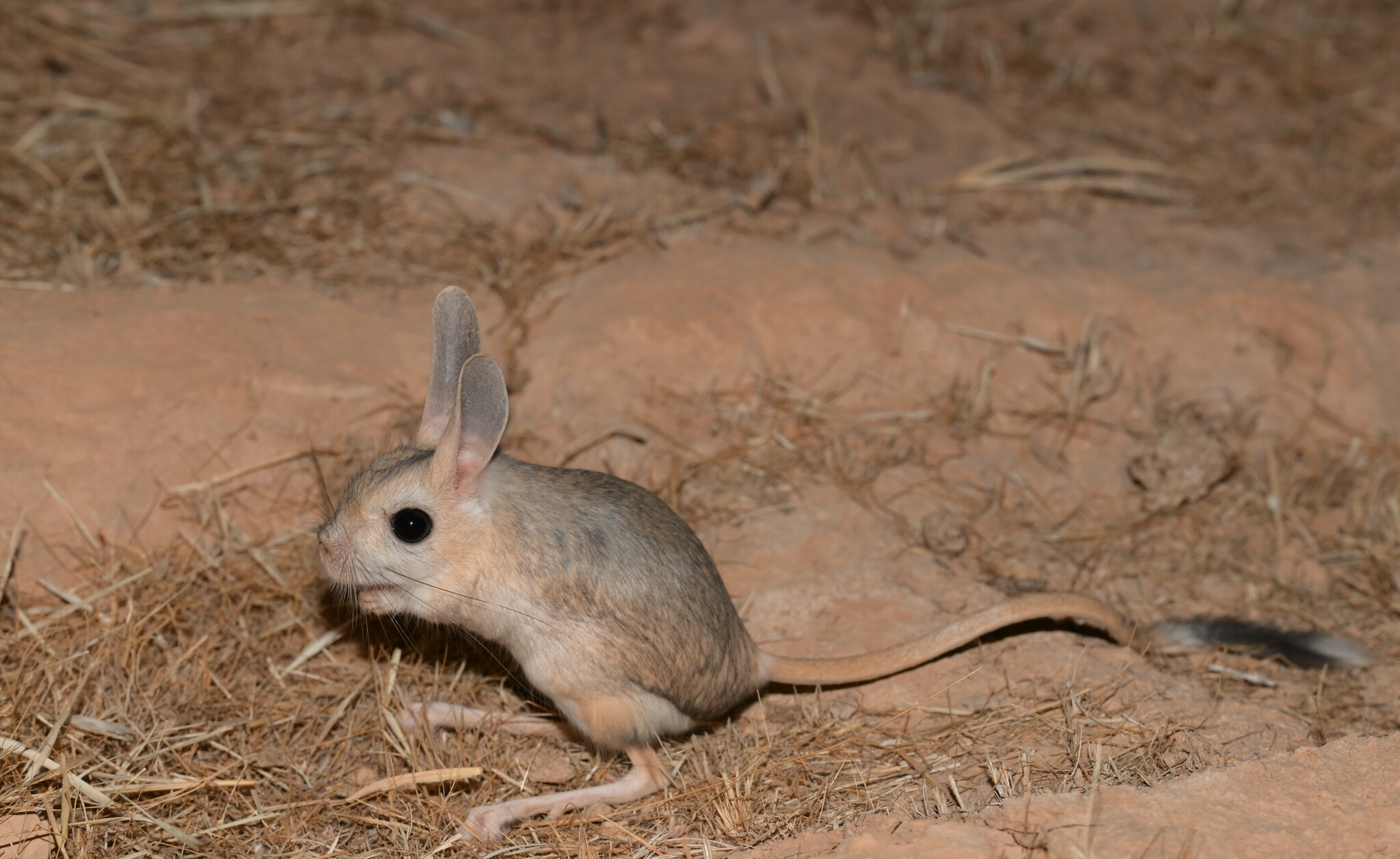

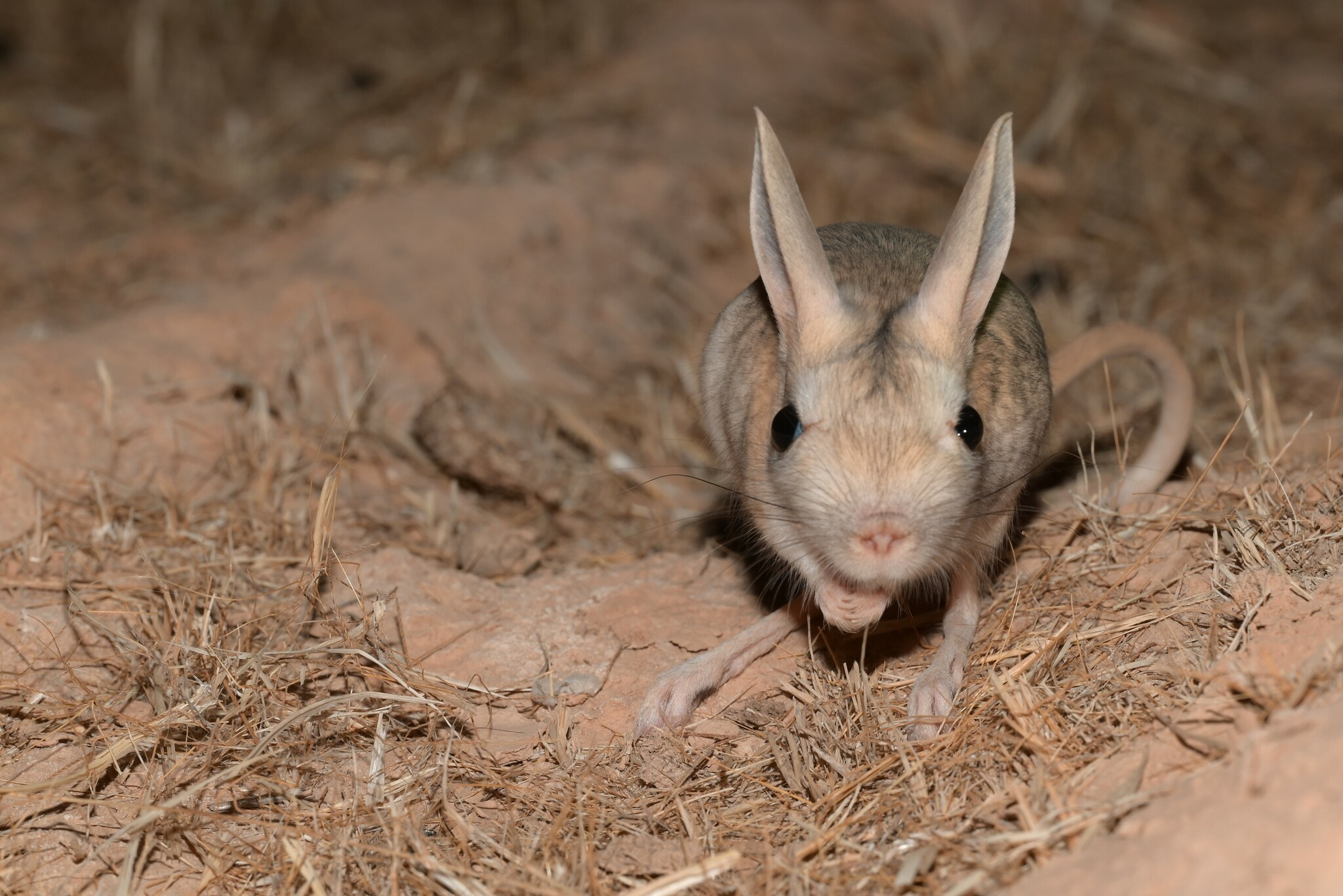

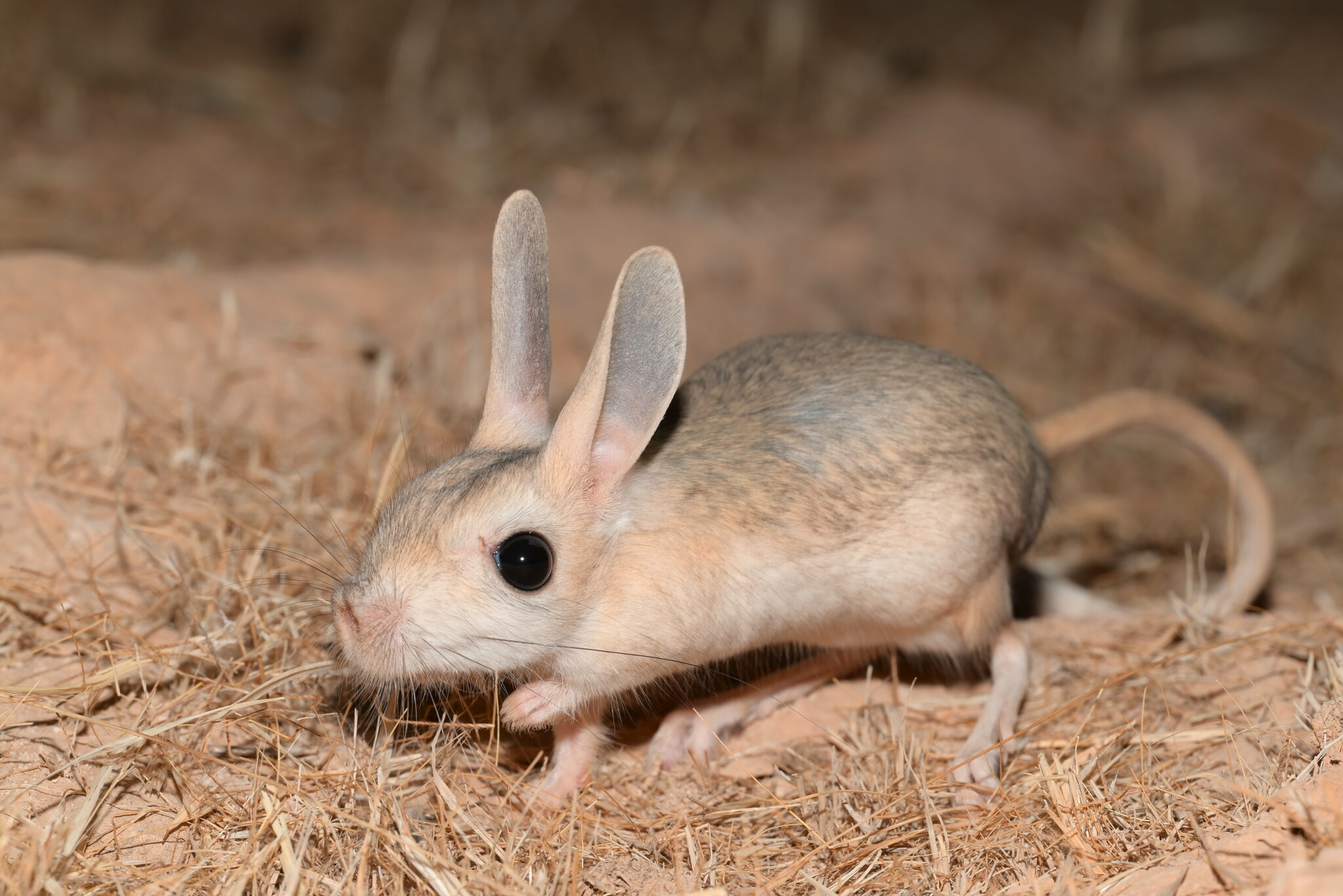

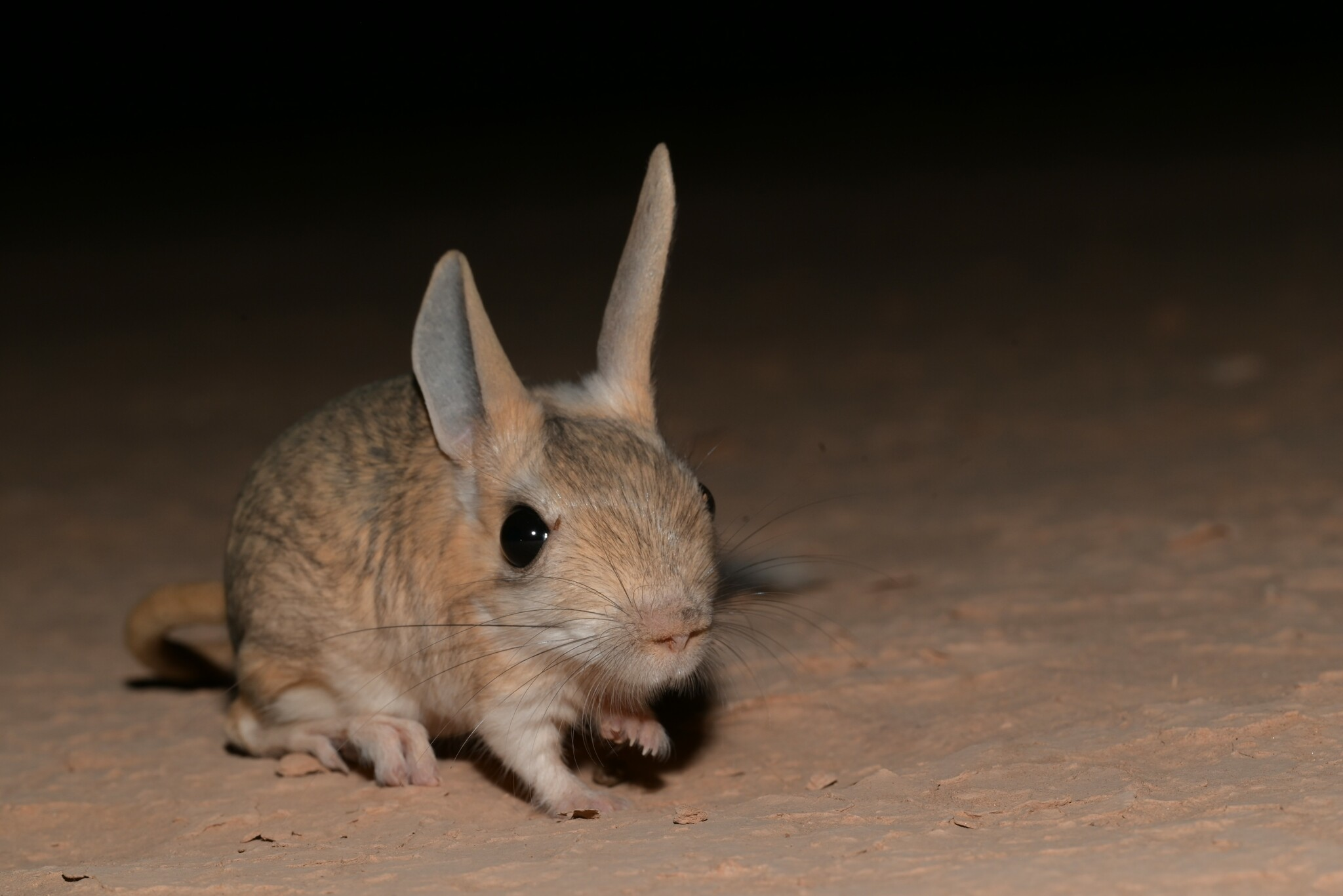

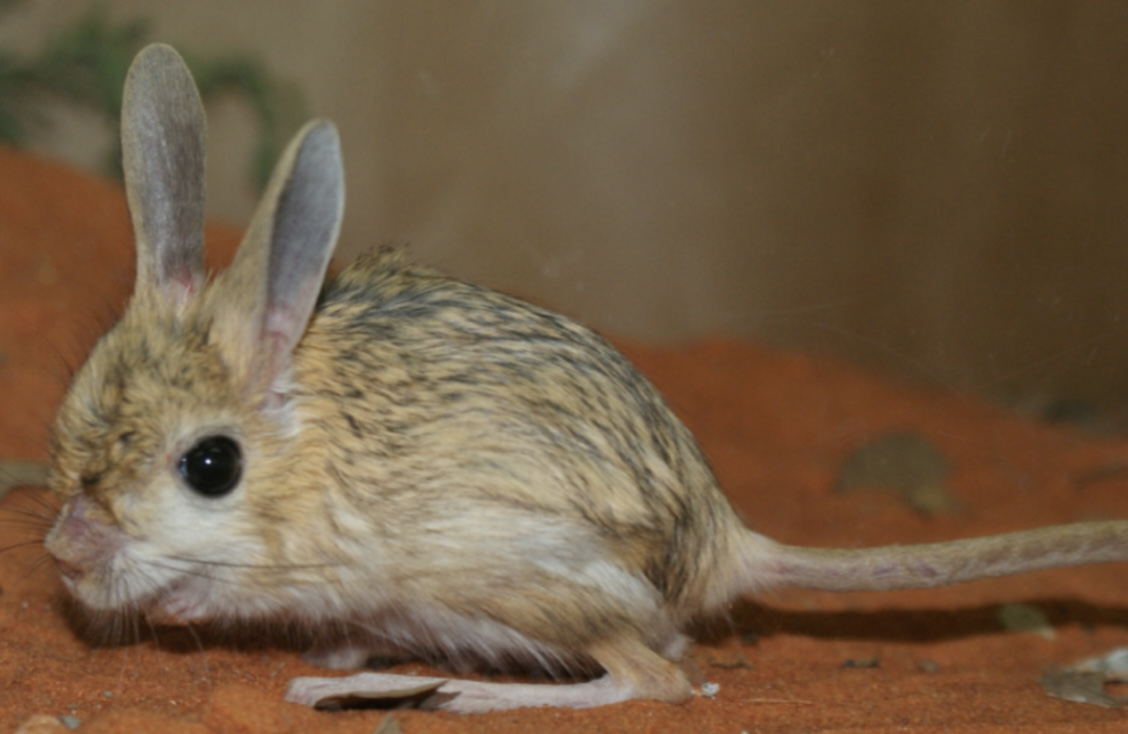
