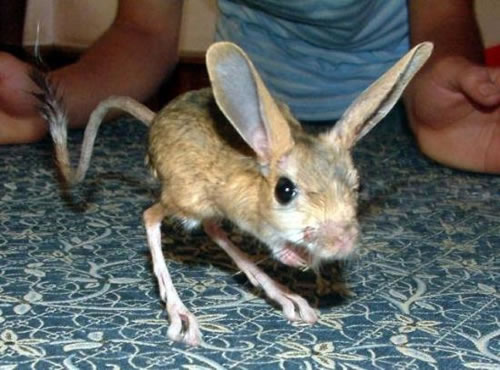
- A four-toed jerboa

Scientific classification
- Kingdom: Animalia
- Phylum: Chordata
- Class: Mammalia
- Infraclass: Placentalia
- Order: Rodentia
- Family: Dipodidae
- Subfamily: Allactaginae
- Genus: Scarturus; Gloger, 1841

Type species
- Dipus tetradactyla Lichtenstein, 1823

Species
- Scarturus elater Scarturus euphraticus Scarturus tetradactyla Scarturus vinogradovi Scarturus williamsi
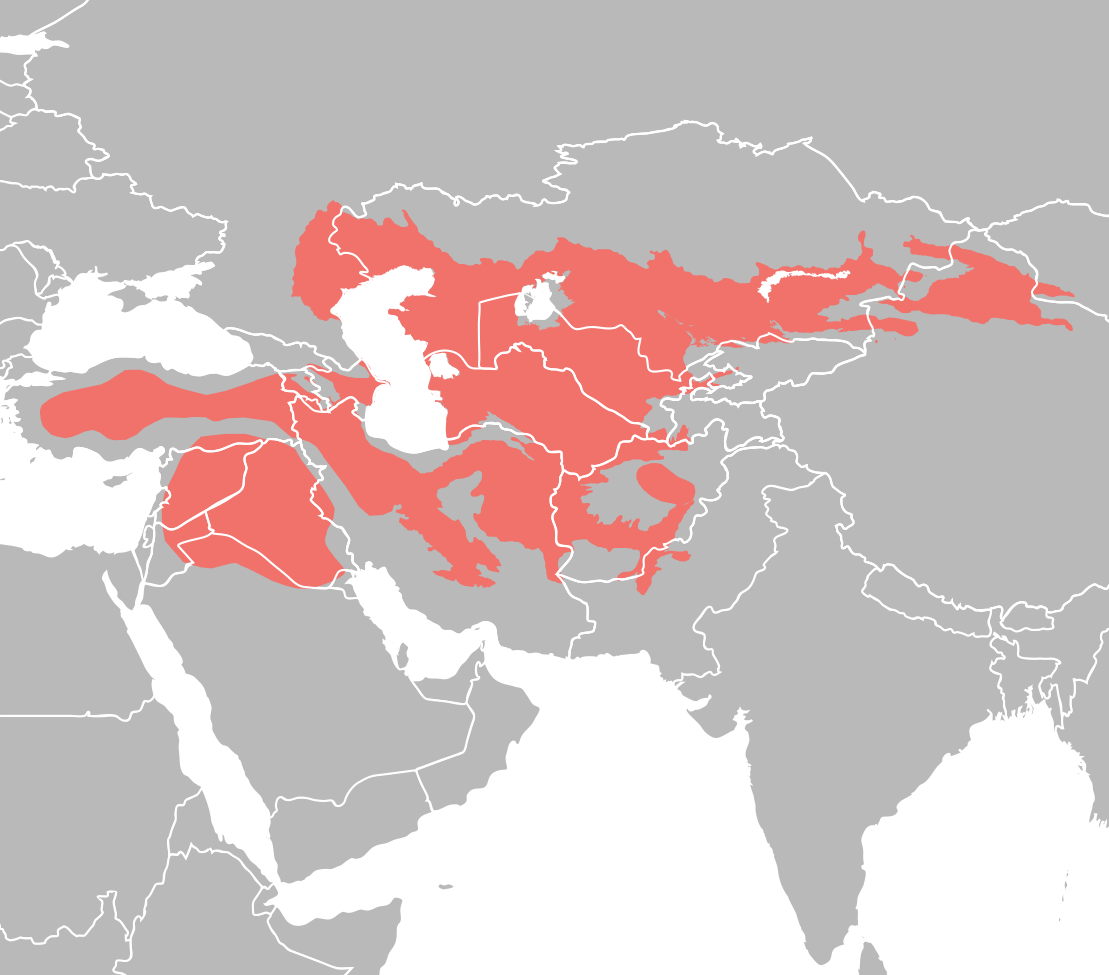
- Scarturus distribution

= Scarturus =

Genus of rodents

Scarturus is a genus of rodent in the family Dipodidae. It contains the following species: (Note: The list is based on The Third edition of Wilson & Reeder's Mammal Species of the World (2005) except where both the Mammal Diversity Database and IUCN agree on the change.)

- Small five-toed jerboa (Scarturus elater)
- Euphrates jerboa (Scarturus euphraticus)
- Four-toed jerboa (Scarturus tetradactyla)
- Vinogradov's jerboa (Scarturus vinogradovi)
- Williams's jerboa (Scarturus williamsi)
