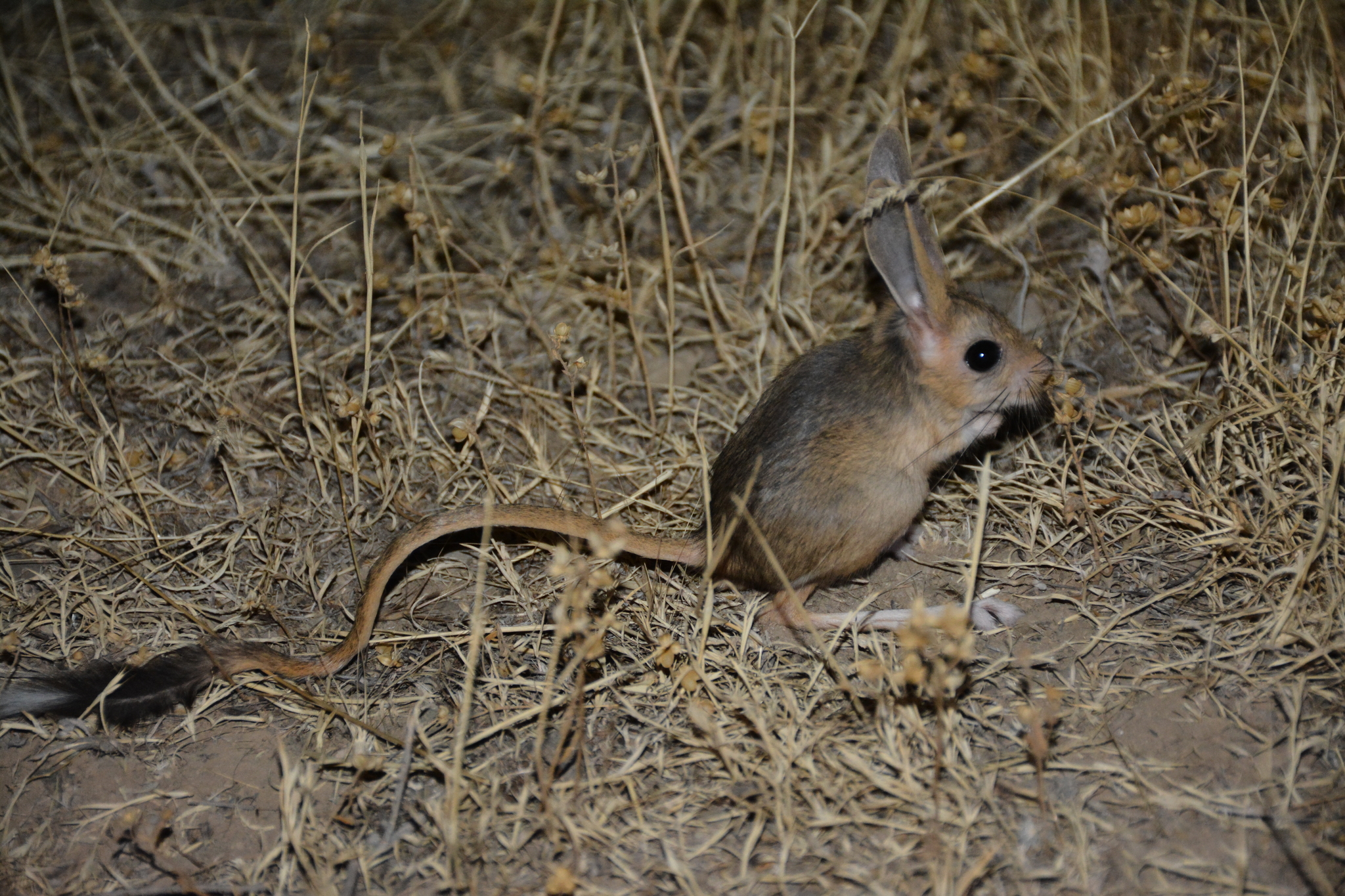

Conservation status
- Least Concern (IUCN 3.1)

Scientific classification
- Kingdom: Animalia
- Phylum: Chordata
- Class: Mammalia
- Order: Rodentia
- Family: Dipodidae
- Genus: Scarturus
- Species: S. williamsi

Binomial name
- Scarturus williamsi (Thomas, 1897)

Synonyms
- Allactaga williamsi

= Williams's jerboa =

Species of mammal

Williams's jerboa (Scarturus williamsi) is a species of jerboas native to Afghanistan, Armenia, Azerbaijan, Iran and Turkey.

== Description ==
Similar to the other jerboas in the Allactaga and Scarturus genera, the Williams's Jerboa are small hopping rodents of desert regions and have large ears and a long tail. The tail assists and serves as support when the jerboa is standing upright. They have long hind feet and short forelegs. The forelimbs of the jerboa serve as a pair of hands for feeding, grooming, etc. The males in this species do not have bacula.

== Distribution and habitat ==
Williams's jerboa is native to Anatolia, Armenia, Azerbaijan, Georgia, Iran, Turkey and northwestern Iran. A separate population is found in central Afghanistan. Its typical habitat is steppe with scanty vegetation cover. It occurs in disturbed areas when sufficient suitable habitat remain but is not normally found in cultivated areas. It favours semi-arid regions and the foothills of mountainous regions. In the west of its range it is found at altitudes of up to 360 metres (1,180 ft) but ranges as high as 3,200 metres (10,500 ft) in Afghanistan.

== Behaviour ==
Williams's jerboa is mainly nocturnal and spends the day in a system of burrows. Emerging at night, it feeds on insects and plant material. The Williams's jerboa is a common food source for the long-eared owl in Turkey. Breeding takes place in spring and summer when two litters, each consisting of three to six young, are reared.

== Status ==
Williams's jerboa has a wide range and, although it is found at relatively low densities, its total population is presumed to be large. It is common in parts of Azerbaijan but is rarer and has become locally extinct in parts of Turkey. The major threat it faces is the conversion of its steppe habitat into cultivated land. The International Union for Conservation of Nature has listed its conservation status as being of "least concern".
