= List of mammals of Turkey =

This list shows the IUCN Red List status of the 150 wild mammal fauna of Turkey.

Icons which state each species' global IUCN status:
EN	Endangered	Facing an extremely high risk of extinction in the wild
VU	Vulnerable	Facing a high risk of extinction in the wild
NT	Near Threatened	Doesn't meet any criteria that would categorise it as risking extinction but likely to in the future
LC	Least Concern	No current identifiable risks to this species
DD	Data Deficient	Inadequate information to make an assessment of the risks to this species

== Order: Rodentia (rodents) ==
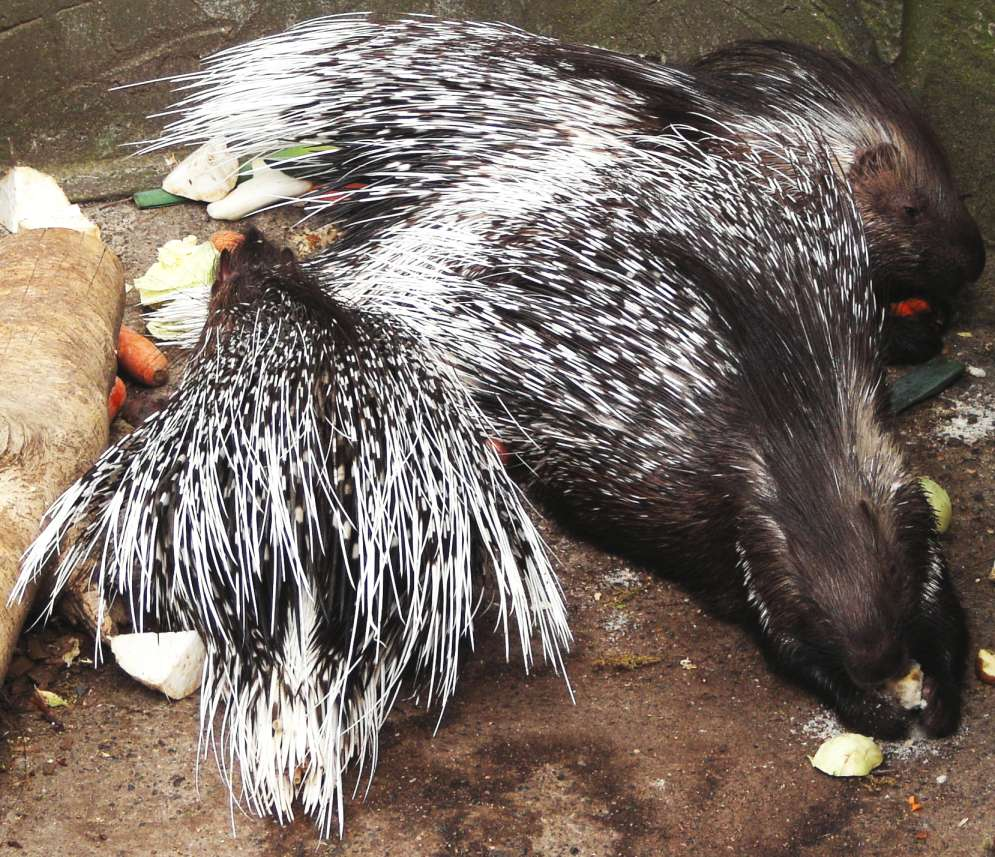
Indian porcupine

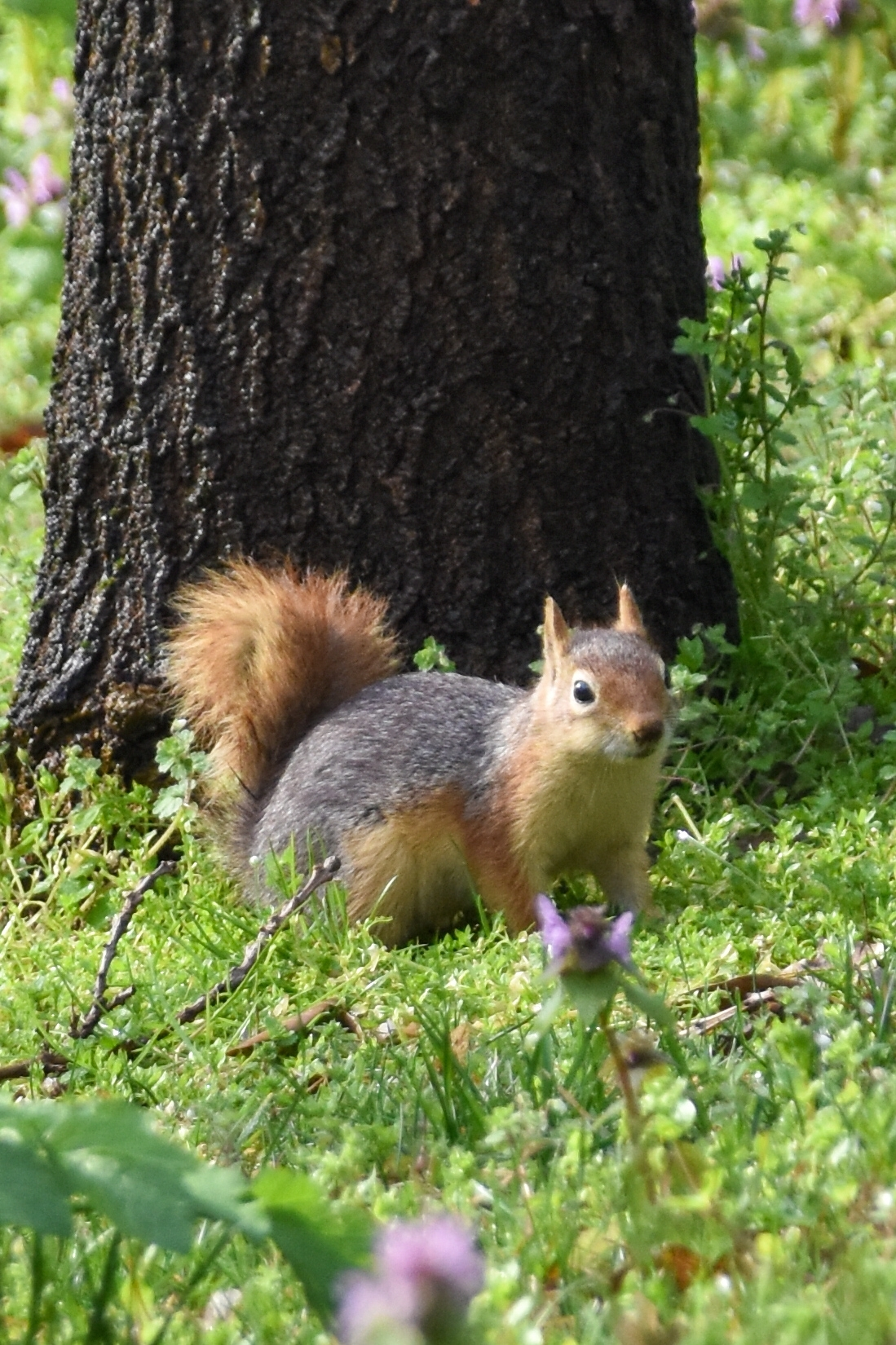
Caucasian squirrel

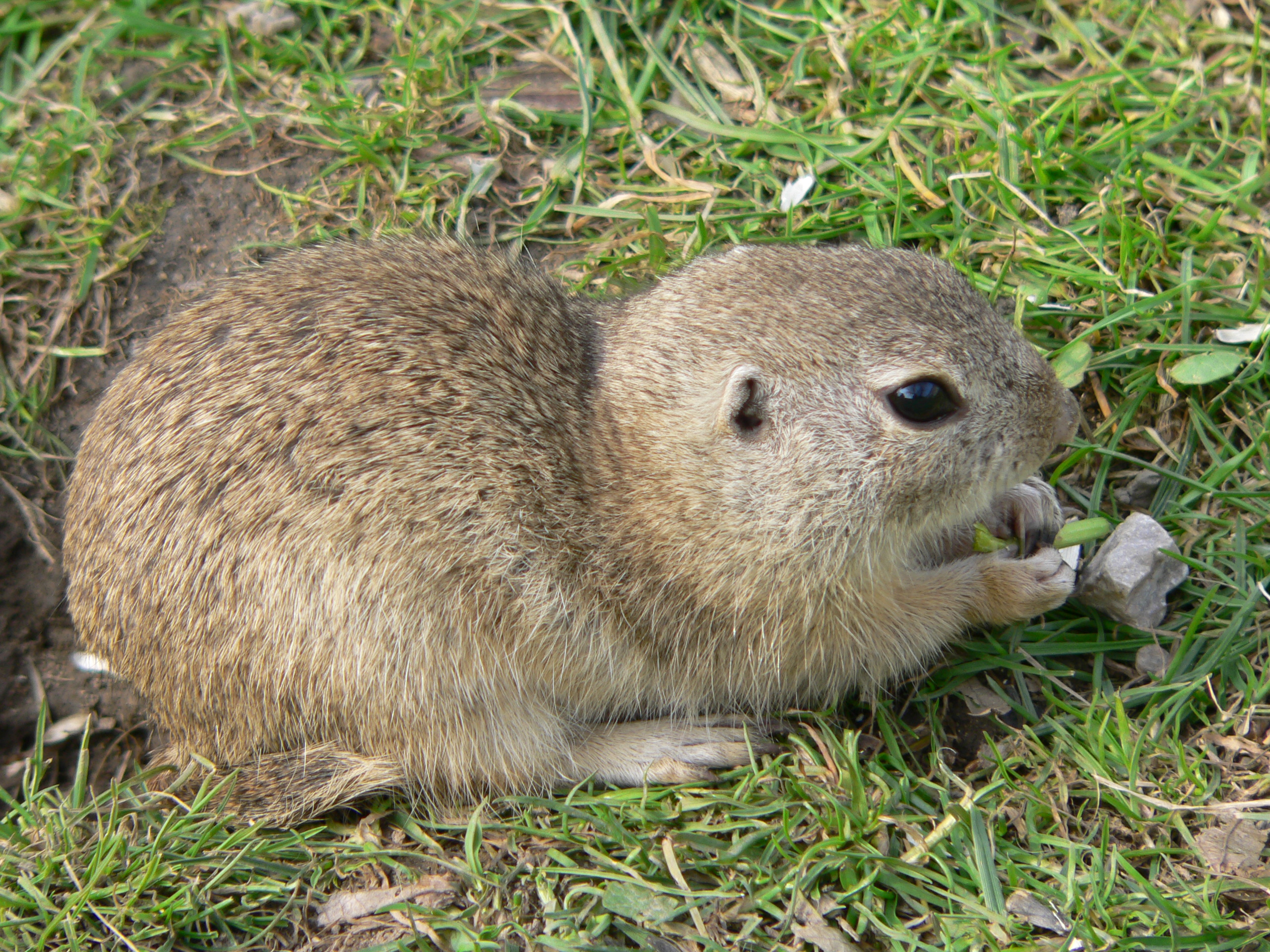
European ground squirrel

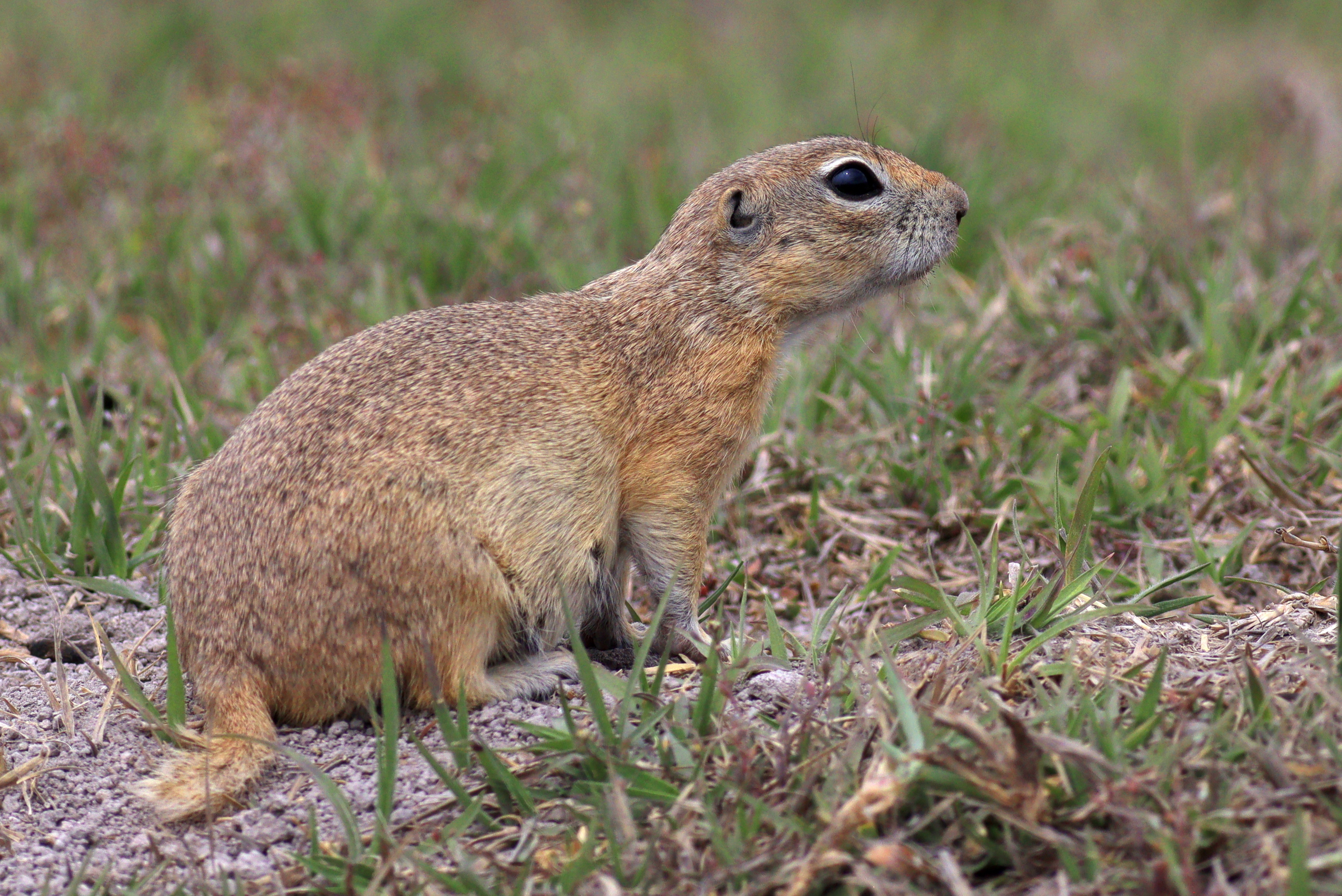
Asia Minor ground squirrel

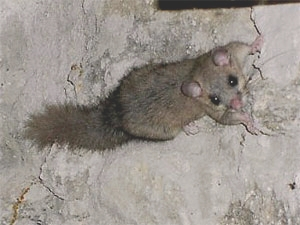
Edible dormouse

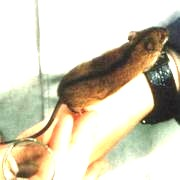
Striped field mouse

Rodents make up the largest order of mammals with over 40% of mammalian species. They have two incisors in the upper and lower jaw, which grow continually and are kept short by gnawing. Most rodents are small though the porcupines can weigh up to 20 kg (44 lb).

- Suborder: Hystricognathi
  - Family: Hystricidae (Old World porcupines)
    - Genus: Hystrix
      - Indian crested porcupine, H. indica LC
- Suborder: Sciurognathi
  - Family: Sciuridae (squirrels)
    - Subfamily: Sciurinae
      - Tribe: Sciurini
        - Genus: Sciurus
          - Caucasian squirrel, S. anomalus LC
          - Eurasian red squirrel, S. vulgaris LC
    - Subfamily: Xerinae
      - Genus: Spermophilus
        - European ground squirrel, S. citellus EN
        - Asia Minor ground squirrel, Spermophilus xanthoprymnus NT
        - Taurus ground squirrel, Spermophilus taurensis LC
  - Family: Cricetidae
    - Subfamily: Cricetinae
      - Genus: Cricetulus
        - Grey dwarf hamster, C. migratorius LC
      - Genus: Mesocricetus
        - Golden hamster, Mesocricetus auratus EN
        - Turkish hamster, Mesocricetus brandti NT
    - Subfamily: Arvicolinae
      - Genus: Arvicola
        - European water vole, A. amphibius LC
      - Genus: Chionomys
        - Caucasian snow vole, Chionomys gud LC
        - European snow vole, Chionomys nivalis LC
        - Robert's snow vole, Chionomys roberti LC
      - Genus: Clethrionomys
        - Bank vole, Clethrionomys glareolus LC
      - Genus: Ellobius
        - Transcaucasian mole vole, Ellobius lutescens LC
      - Genus: Microtus
        - Common vole, Microtus arvalis LC
        - Günther's vole, Microtus guentheri LC
        - Persian vole, Microtus irani VU
        - Southern vole, Microtus rossiaemeridionalis LC
        - Social vole, Microtus socialis LC
        - European pine vole, Microtus subterraneus LC
      - Genus: Prometheomys
        - Long-clawed mole vole, Prometheomys schaposchnikowi LC
  - Family: Gliridae (dormice)
    - Subfamily: Leithiinae
      - Genus: Dryomys
        - Woolly dormouse, Dryomys laniger DD
        - Forest dormouse, Dryomys nitedula LC
      - Genus: Eliomys
        - Asian garden dormouse, E. melanurus LC
      - Genus: Muscardinus
        - Hazel dormouse, Muscardinus avellanarius LC
      - Genus: Myomimus
        - Roach's mouse-tailed dormouse, Myomimus roachi VU
    - Subfamily: Glirinae
      - Genus: Glis
        - European edible dormouse, Glis glis LC
  - Family: Dipodidae (jerboas)
    - Subfamily: Allactaginae
      - Genus: Allactaga
        - Small five-toed jerboa, Allactaga elater LC
        - Euphrates jerboa, Allactaga euphratica LC
  - Family: Spalacidae
    - Subfamily: Spalacinae
      - Genus: Nannospalax
        - Middle East blind mole-rat, Nannospalax ehrenbergi LC
        - Lesser mole rat, Nannospalax leucodon LC
        - Nehring's blind mole-rat, Nannospalax nehringi LC
  - Family: Muridae (mice, rats, voles, gerbils, hamsters)
    - Subfamily: Deomyinae
      - Genus: Acomys
        - Asia Minor spiny mouse, Acomys cilicicus DD
    - Subfamily: Gerbillinae
      - Genus: Meriones
        - Persian jird, Meriones persicus LC
        - Tristram's jird, Meriones tristrami LC
        - Vinogradov's jird, Meriones vinogradovi LC
    - Subfamily: Murinae
      - Genus: Apodemus
        - Striped field mouse, Apodemus agrarius LC
        - Yellow-necked mouse, Apodemus flavicollis LC
        - Yellow-breasted field mouse, Apodemus fulvipectus LC
        - Black Sea field mouse, Apodemus ponticus LC
        - Wood mouse, Apodemus sylvaticus LC
        - Ural field mouse, Apodemus uralensis LC
      - Genus: Micromys
        - Eurasian harvest mouse, Micromys minutus LC
      - Genus: Mus
        - Macedonian mouse, Mus macedonicus LC
        - House mouse, M. musculus LC
  - Family: Echimyidae
    - Subfamily: Echimyinae
      - Genus: Myocastor
        - Coypu Myocastor coypus LC (invasive)

== Order: Lagomorpha (rabbits, hares and picas) ==
- Family: Leporidae
  - Genus: Lepus
    - European hare, L. europaeus LC

== Order: Eulipotyphla (hedgehogs, shrews and moles) ==
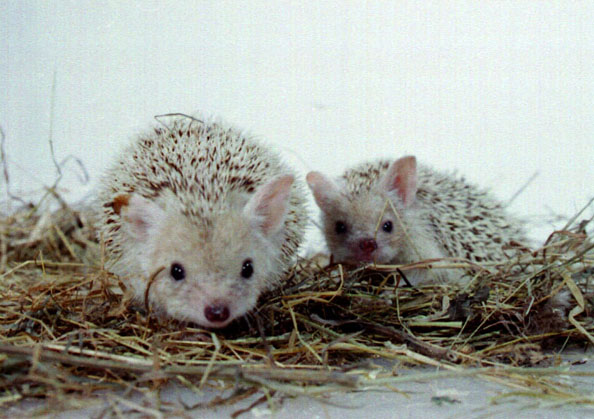
Long-eared hedgehog

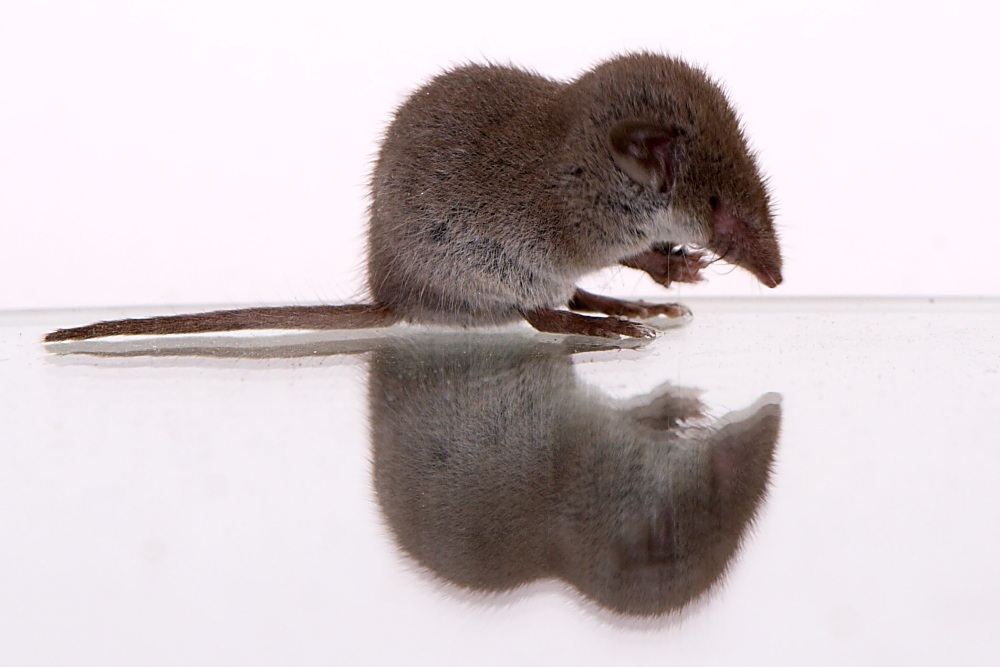
Lesser white-toothed shrew

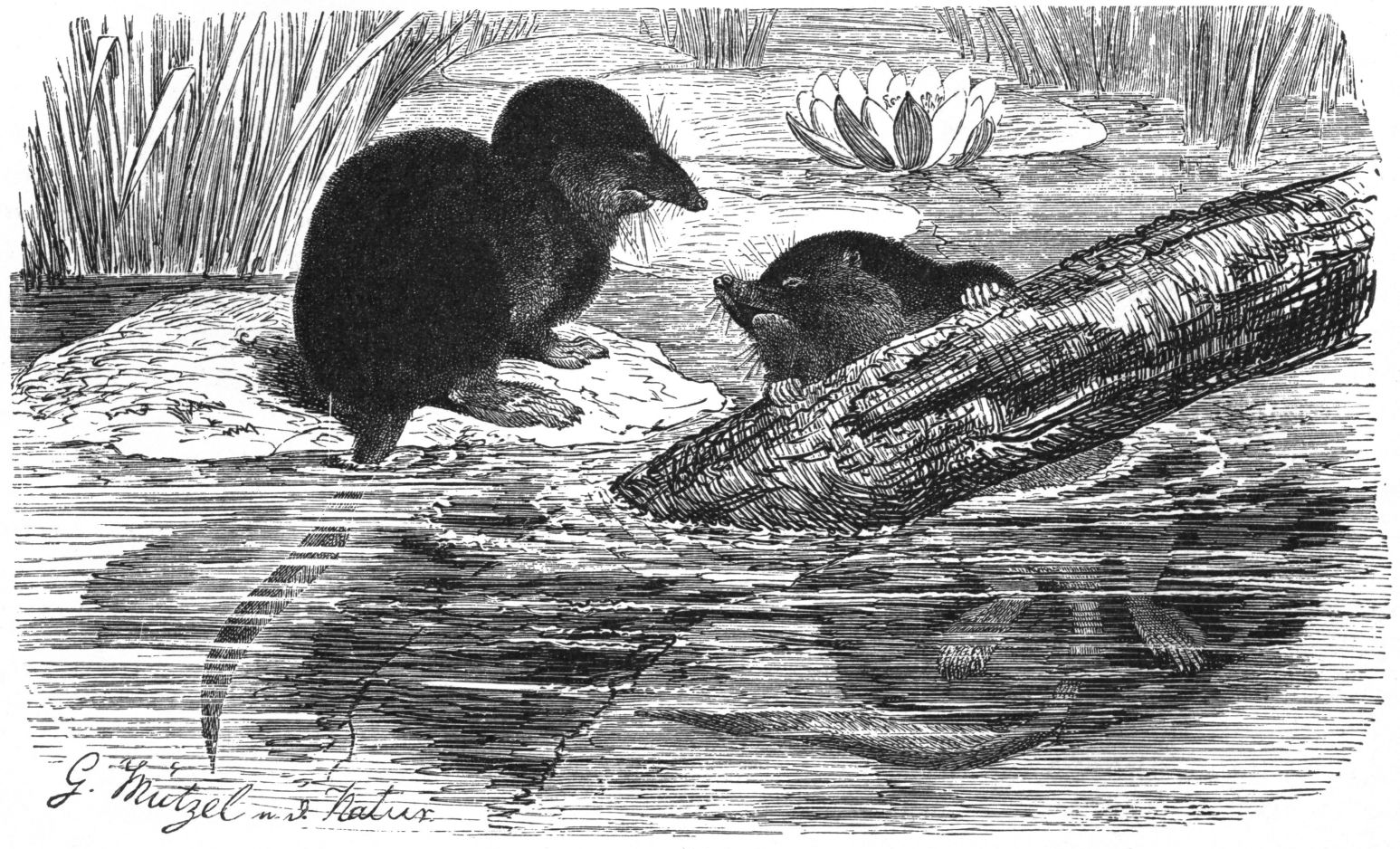
Eurasian water shrew

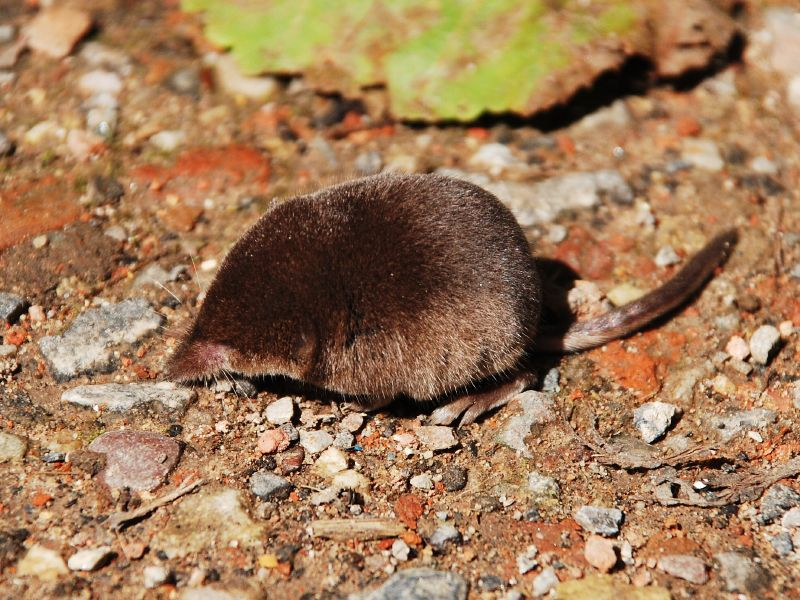
Eurasian pygmy shrew

Hedgehogs are easily recognised by their spines, shrews closely resemble mice, and moles are stout-bodied burrowers.

- Family: Erinaceidae (hedgehogs)
  - Subfamily: Erinaceinae
    - Genus: Erinaceus
      - Northern white-breasted hedgehog, E. roumanicus LC
      - Southern white-breasted hedgehog, E. concolor LC
    - Genus: Hemiechinus
      - Long-eared hedgehog, H. auritus LC
- Family: Soricidae (shrews)
  - Subfamily: Crocidurinae
    - Genus: Crocidura
      - Gueldenstaedt's shrew, C. gueldenstaedtii LC
      - Bicolored shrew, C. leucodon LC
      - Serezkaya shrew, C. serezkyensis LC
      - Lesser white-toothed shrew, C. suaveolens LC
    - Genus: Suncus
      - Etruscan shrew, S. etruscus LC
  - Subfamily: Soricinae
    - Tribe: Nectogalini
      - Genus: Neomys
        - Southern water shrew, N. anomalus LC
        - Eurasian water shrew, N. fodiens LC
        - Transcaucasian water shrew, N. schelkovnikovi LC
    - Tribe: Soricini
      - Genus: Sorex
        - Common shrew, S. araneus LC
        - Eurasian pygmy shrew, S. minutus LC
        - Radde's shrew, S. raddei LC
        - Caucasian shrew, S. satunini LC
        - Caucasian pygmy shrew, S. volnuchini LC
- Family: Talpidae (moles)
  - Subfamily: Talpinae
    - Tribe: Talpini
      - Genus: Talpa
        - European mole, T. europaea LC
        - Levantine mole, T. levantis LC

== Order: Chiroptera (bats) ==
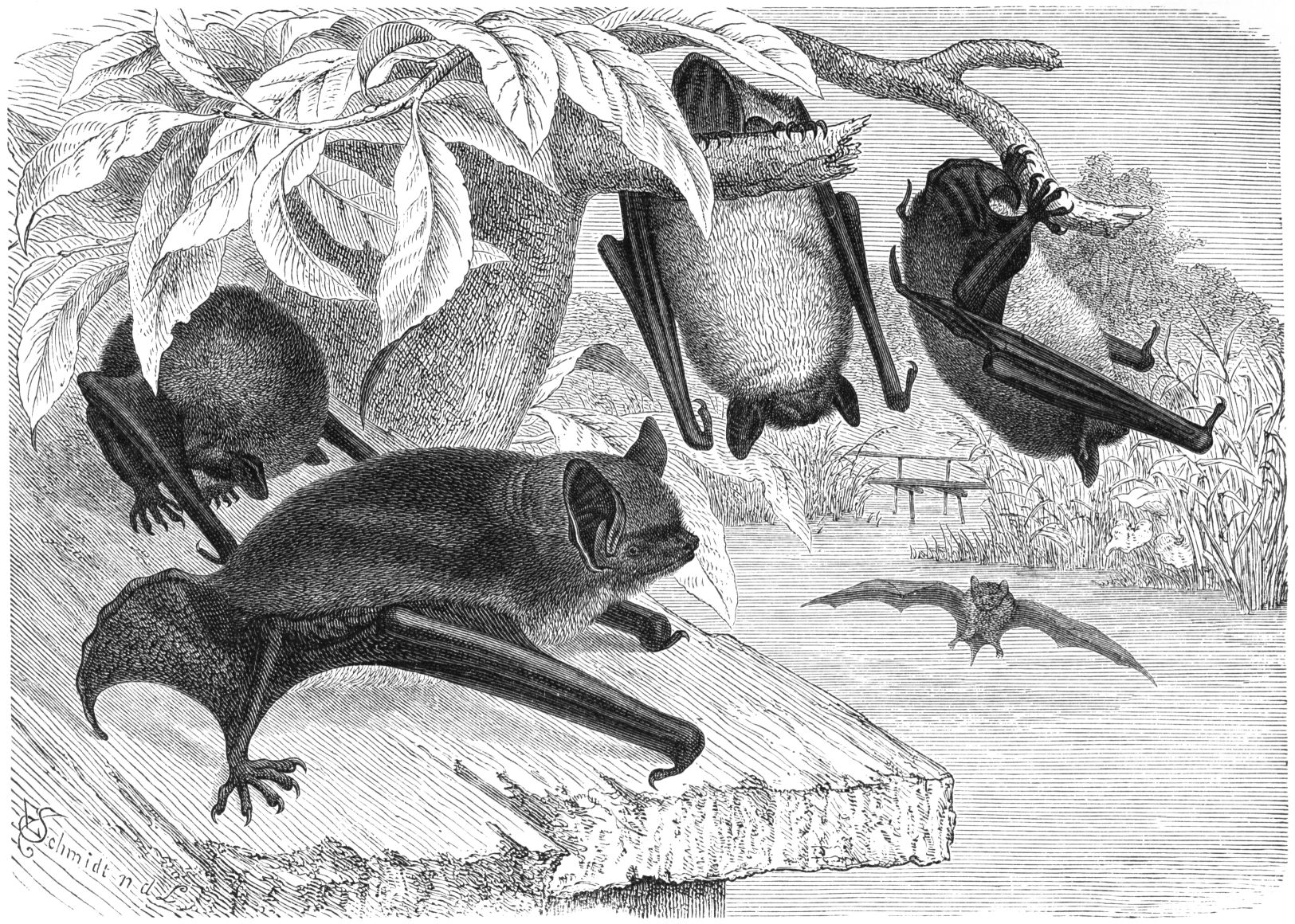
Daubenton's bat

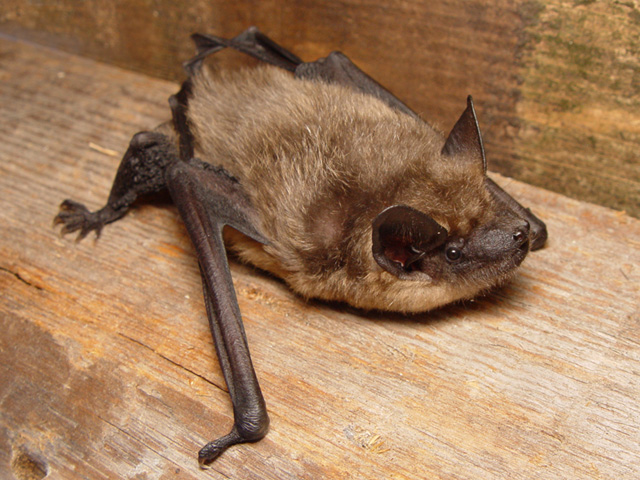
Serotine bat

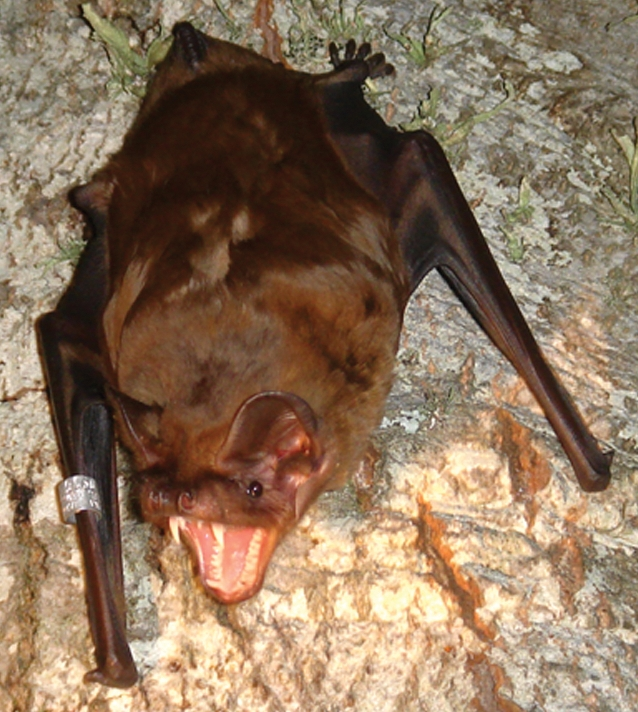
Greater noctule bat

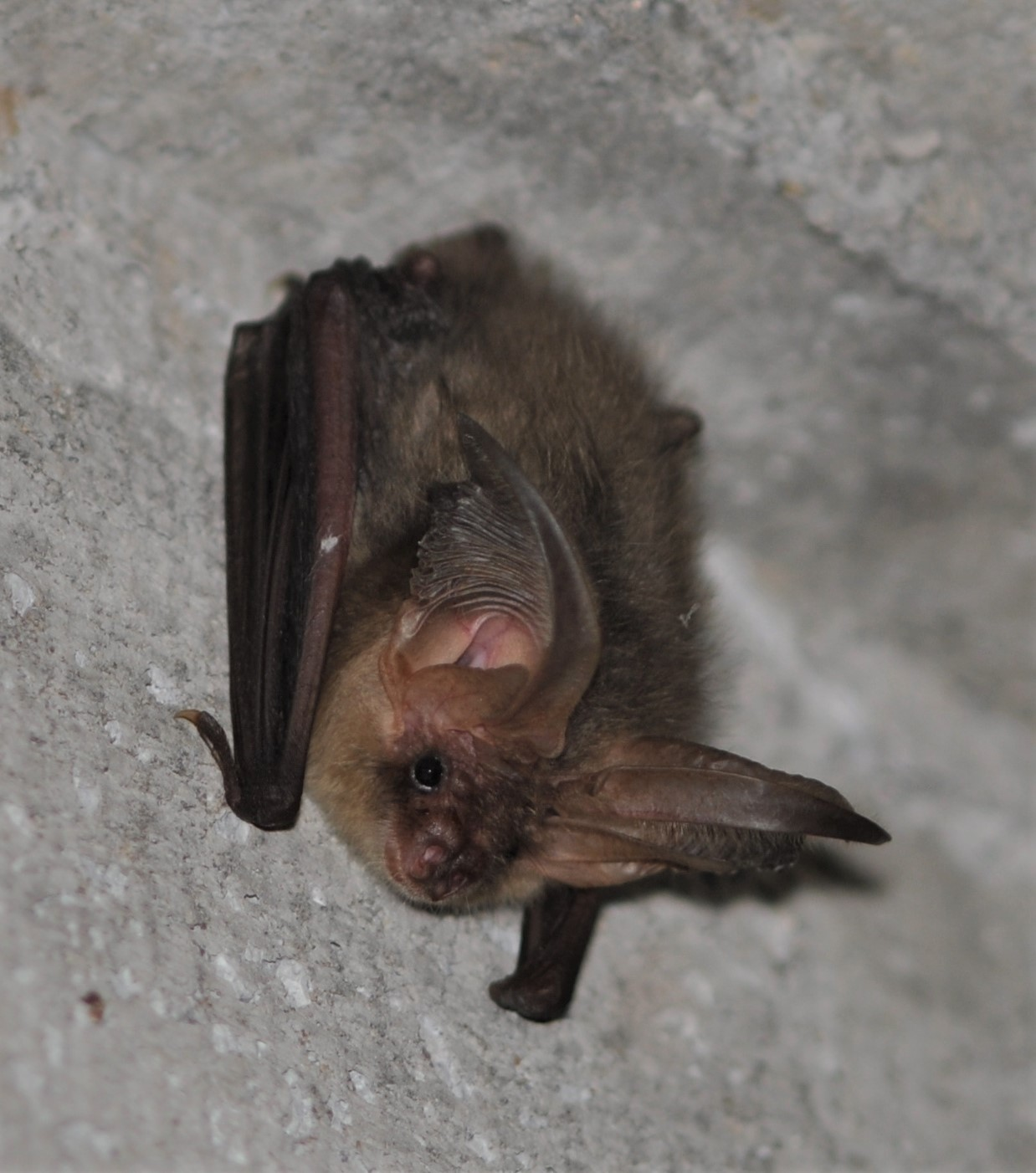
Brown long-eared bat

The bats' distinguishing feature is that their forelimbs are developed as wings, making them the only mammals capable of flight. Bat species account for about 20% of all mammals.

- Family: Pteropodidae (flying foxes, Old World fruit bats)
  - Subfamily: Pteropodinae
    - Genus: Rousettus
      - Egyptian fruit bat, R. aegyptiacus LC
- Family: Vespertilionidae
  - Subfamily: Myotinae
    - Genus: Myotis
      - Bechstein's bat, M. bechsteini NT
      - Greater mouse-eared bat, M. myotis LC
      - Brandt's bat, M. brandti LC
      - Long-fingered bat, M. capaccinii VU
      - Daubenton's bat, M. daubentonii LC
      - Geoffroy's bat, M. emarginatus LC
      - Whiskered bat, M. mystacinus LC
      - Natterer's bat, M. nattereri LC
  - Subfamily: Vespertilioninae
    - Genus: Barbastella
      - Western barbastelle, B. barbastellus NT
    - Genus: Eptesicus
      - Botta's serotine, Eptesicus bottae LC
      - Northern bat, E. nilssoni LC
      - Serotine bat, E. serotinus LC
    - Genus: Hypsugo
      - Savi's pipistrelle, H. savii LC
    - Genus: Nyctalus
      - Greater noctule bat, N. lasiopterus VU
      - Lesser noctule, N. leisleri LC
      - Common noctule, N. noctula LC
    - Genus: Pipistrellus
      - Kuhl's pipistrelle, P. kuhlii LC
      - Nathusius' pipistrelle, P. nathusii LC
      - Common pipistrelle, P. pipistrellus LC
    - Genus: Plecotus
      - Brown long-eared bat, P. auritus LC
      - Grey long-eared bat, P. austriacus NT
    - Genus: Vespertilio
      - Parti-coloured bat, V. murinus LC
  - Subfamily: Miniopterinae
    - Genus: Miniopterus
      - Common bent-wing bat, M. schreibersii VU
- Family: Molossidae
  - Genus: Tadarida
    - European free-tailed bat, T. teniotis LC
- Family: Emballonuridae
  - Genus: Taphozous
    - Naked-rumped tomb bat, T. nudiventris LC
- Family: Rhinolophidae
  - Subfamily: Rhinolophinae
    - Genus: Rhinolophus
      - Blasius's horseshoe bat, R. blasii LC
      - Mediterranean horseshoe bat, R. euryale NT
      - Greater horseshoe bat, R. ferrumequinum LC
      - Lesser horseshoe bat, R. hipposideros LC
      - Mehely's horseshoe bat, R. mehelyi VU

== Order: Cetacea (whales, dolphins, and porpoises) ==
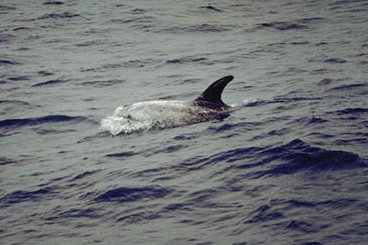
Risso's dolphin

The order Cetacea includes whales, dolphins and porpoises. They are the mammals most fully adapted to aquatic life with a spindle-shaped nearly hairless body, protected by a thick layer of blubber, and forelimbs and tail modified to provide propulsion underwater.

Species listed below also includes species being recorded in Levantine Sea.

- Suborder: Mysticeti
  - Family: Balaenopteridae
    - Genus: Balaenoptera
      - Common minke whale, B. acutorostrata LC
      - Fin whale, B. physalus VU
- Subfamily: Megapterinae
  - Genus: Megaptera
    - Humpback whale, M. novaeangliae LC
- Suborder: Odontoceti
  - Family: Physeteridae (sperm whales)
    - Genus: Physeter
      - Sperm whale, P. macrocephalus VU
    - Family: Ziphidae
      - Genus: Ziphius
        - Cuvier's beaked whale, Z. cavirostris LC
  - Superfamily: Platanistoidea
    - Family: Phocoenidae
      - Genus: Phocoena
        - Harbour porpoise, P. phocoena LC
    - Family: Delphinidae (marine dolphins)
      - Genus: Tursiops
        - Common bottlenose dolphin, T. truncatus LC
      - Genus: Delphinus
        - Short-beaked common dolphin, D. delphis LC
      - Genus: Stenella
        - Striped dolphin, S. coeruleoalba LC
      - Genus: Grampus
        - Risso's dolphin, G. griseus LC
      - Genus: Orcinus
        - Orca, O. orca DD
      - Genus: Pseudorca
        - False killer whale, P. crassidens NT
      - Genus: Globicephala
        - Long-finned pilot whale, G. melas LC

== Order: Carnivora (carnivorans) ==
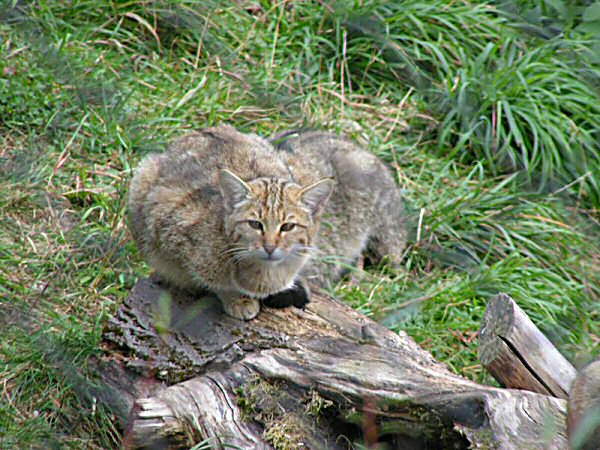
European wildcat

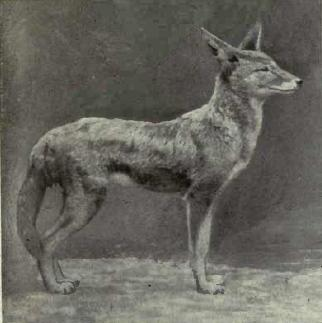
The European jackal (Canis aureus moreotica) is common in Aegean and Mediterranean coasts of the country

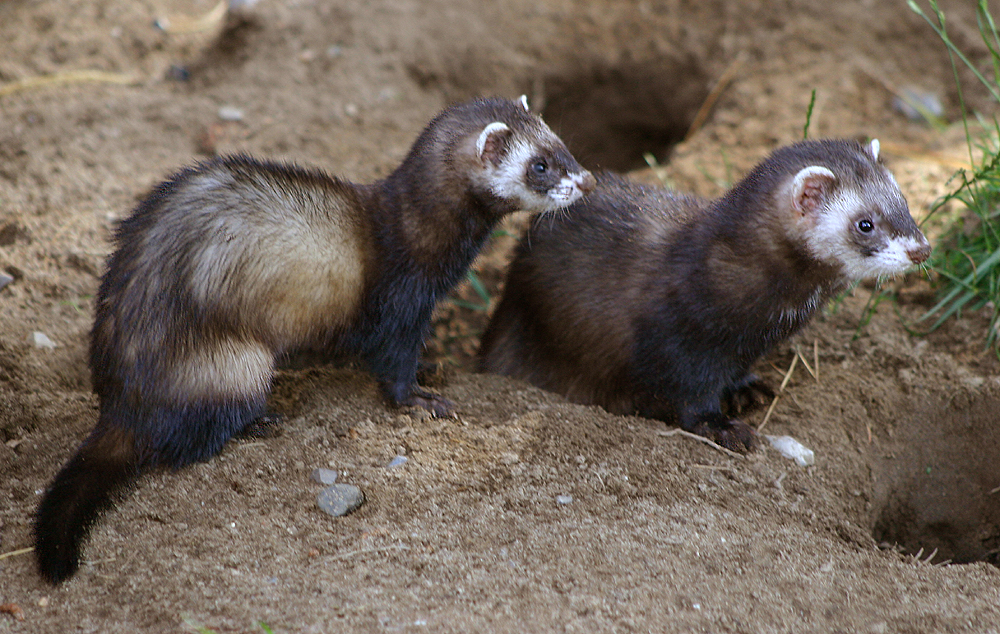
European polecat

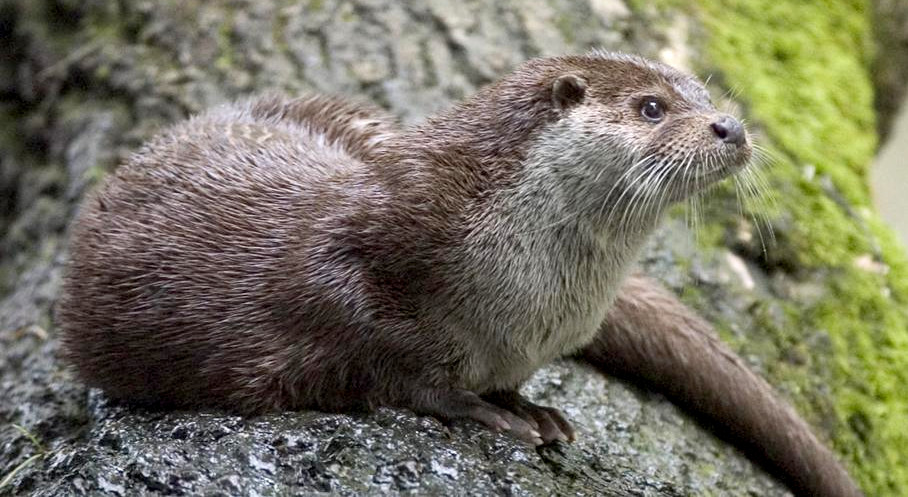
European otter

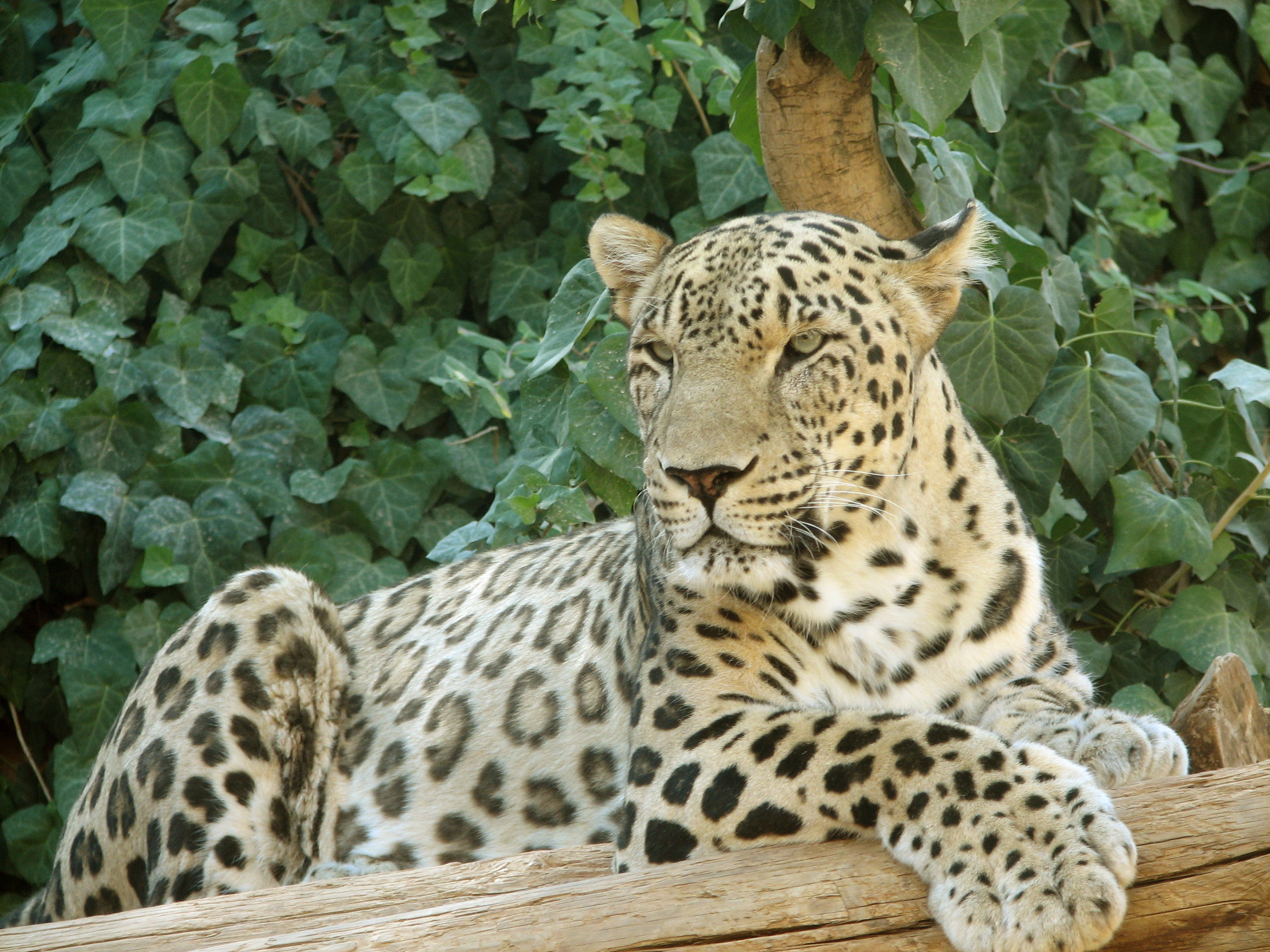
Persian leopard

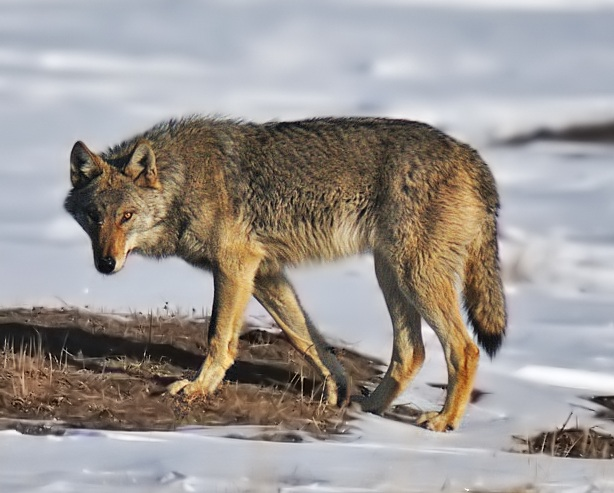
Gray wolf near Erzurum

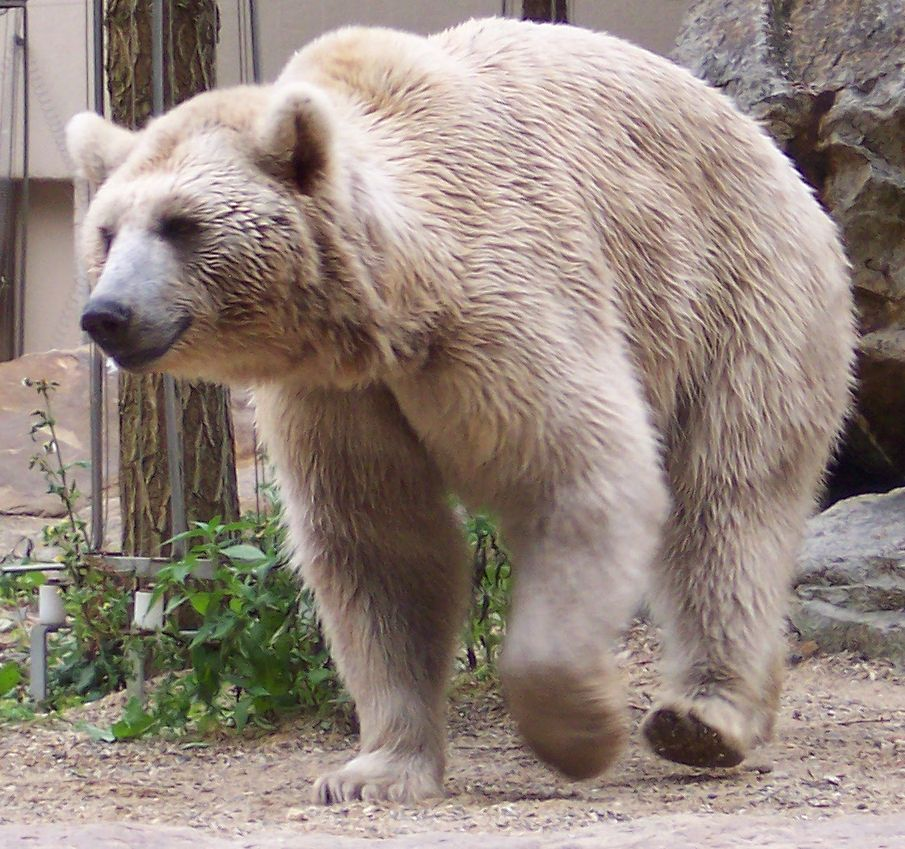
Syrian brown bear

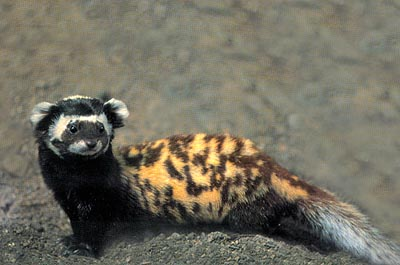
Marbled polecat

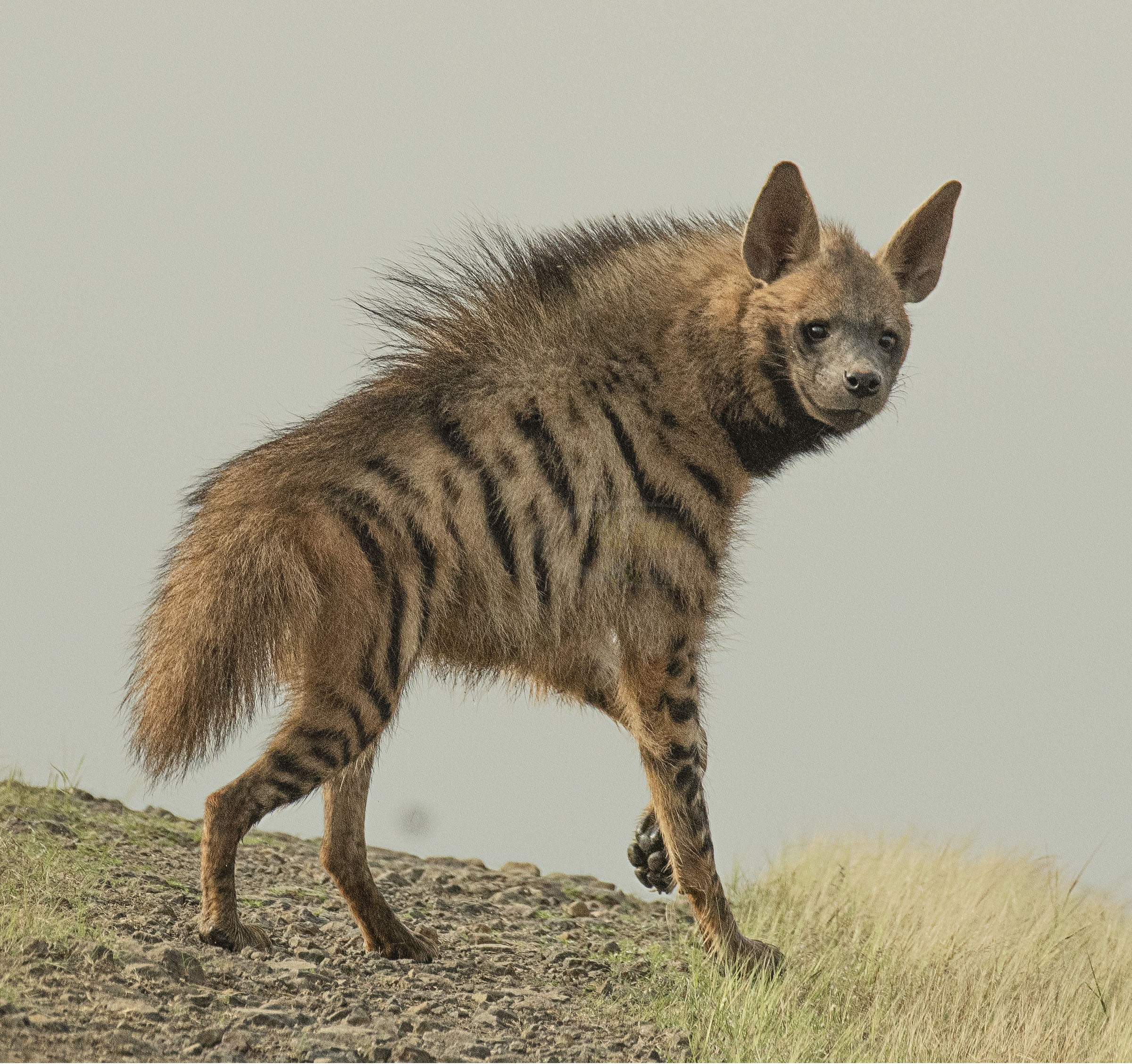
Striped hyena

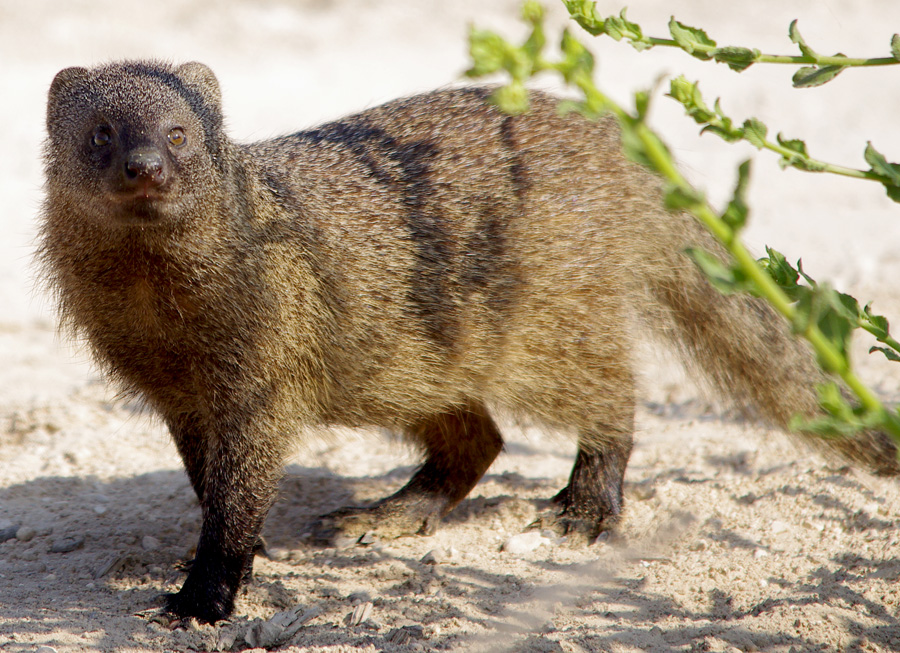
Egyptian mongoose

There are over 260 species of carnivorans, the majority of which feed primarily on meat. They have a characteristic skull shape and dentition.

- Suborder: Feliformia
  - Family: Felidae (cats)
    - Subfamily: Felinae
      - Genus: Caracal
        - Caracal, C. caracal LC
      - Genus: Felis
        - Jungle cat, F. chaus LC
        - African wildcat, F. lybica LC
          - Asiatic wildcat, F. l. ornata
        - European wildcat, F. silvestris LC
          - Caucasian wildcat, F. s. caucasica
      - Genus: Lynx
        - Eurasian lynx, L. lynx LC
          - Caucasian lynx, L. l. dinniki
    - Subfamily: Pantherinae
      - Genus: Panthera
        - Leopard, P. pardus VU
          - P. p. tulliana, EN
  - Family: Herpestidae (mongooses)
    - Genus: Herpestes
      - Egyptian mongoose, H. ichneumon LC
    - Genus: Urva
      - Indian grey mongoose, U. edwardsii LC
  - Family: Hyaenidae (hyaenas)
    - Genus: Hyaena
      - Striped hyena, H. hyaena NT
- Suborder: Caniformia
  - Family: Canidae (dogs, foxes)
    - Genus: Canis
      - Golden jackal, C. aureus LC
        - European jackal, C. a. moreoticus
      - Gray wolf, C. lupus LC
        - Steppe wolf, C. l. campestris
        - Indian wolf, C. l. pallipes
    - Genus: Vulpes
      - Red fox, V. vulpes LC
  - Family: Ursidae (bears)
    - Genus: Ursus
      - Brown bear, U. arctos LC
  - Family: Mustelidae (mustelids)
    - Genus: Lutra
      - European otter, L. lutra NT
    - Genus: Martes
      - Beech marten, M. foina LC
      - European pine marten, M. martes LC
    - Genus: Meles
      - Caucasian badger, M. canescens
    - Genus: Mustela
      - Stoat, M. erminea LC
      - Least weasel, M. nivalis LC
      - European polecat, M. putorius LC
    - Genus: Vormela
      - Marbled polecat, V. peregusna VU
  - Family: Phocidae (earless seals)
    - Genus: Monachus
      - Mediterranean monk seal, M. monachus VU

== Order: Artiodactyla (even-toed ungulates) ==
Even-toed ungulates' weight is borne about equally by the third and fourth toes, rather than mostly or entirely by the third as in perissodactyls. There are about 220 artiodactyl species, including many that are of great economic importance to humans.

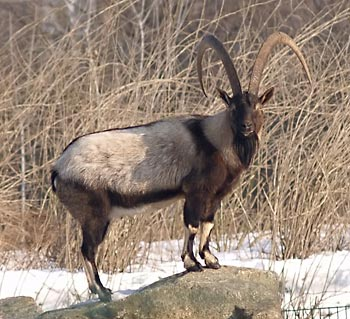
Wild goat

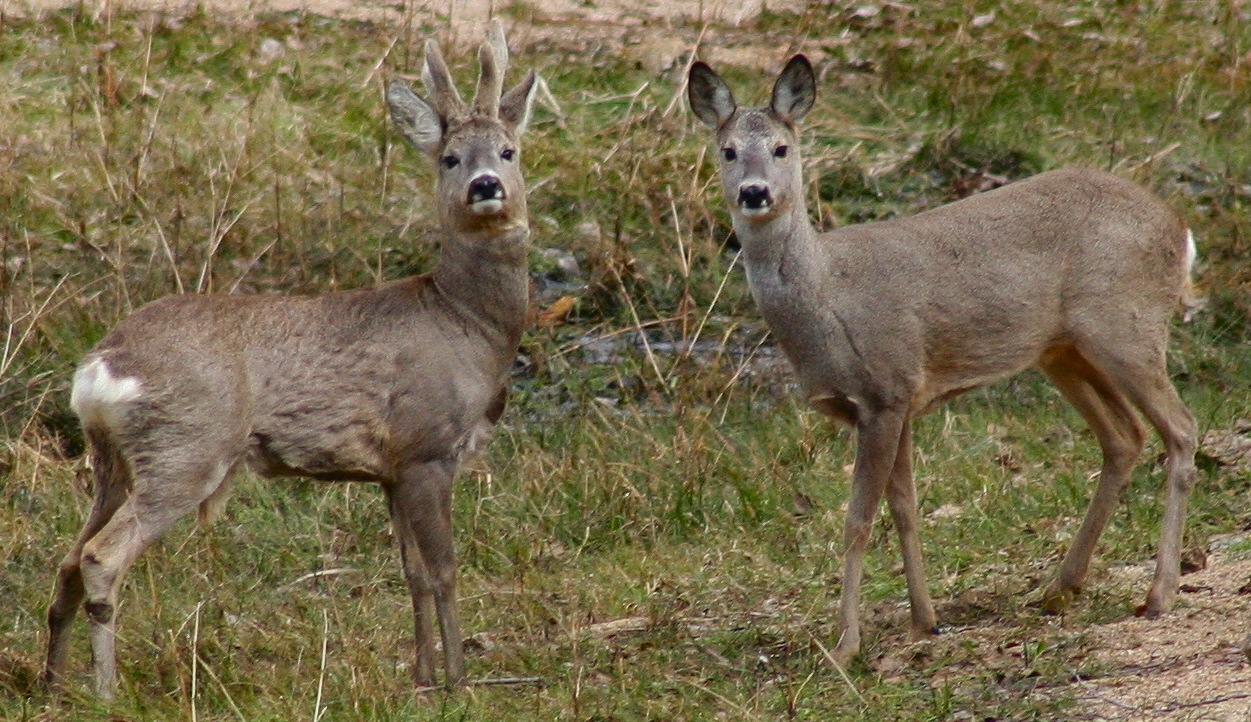
Roe deer

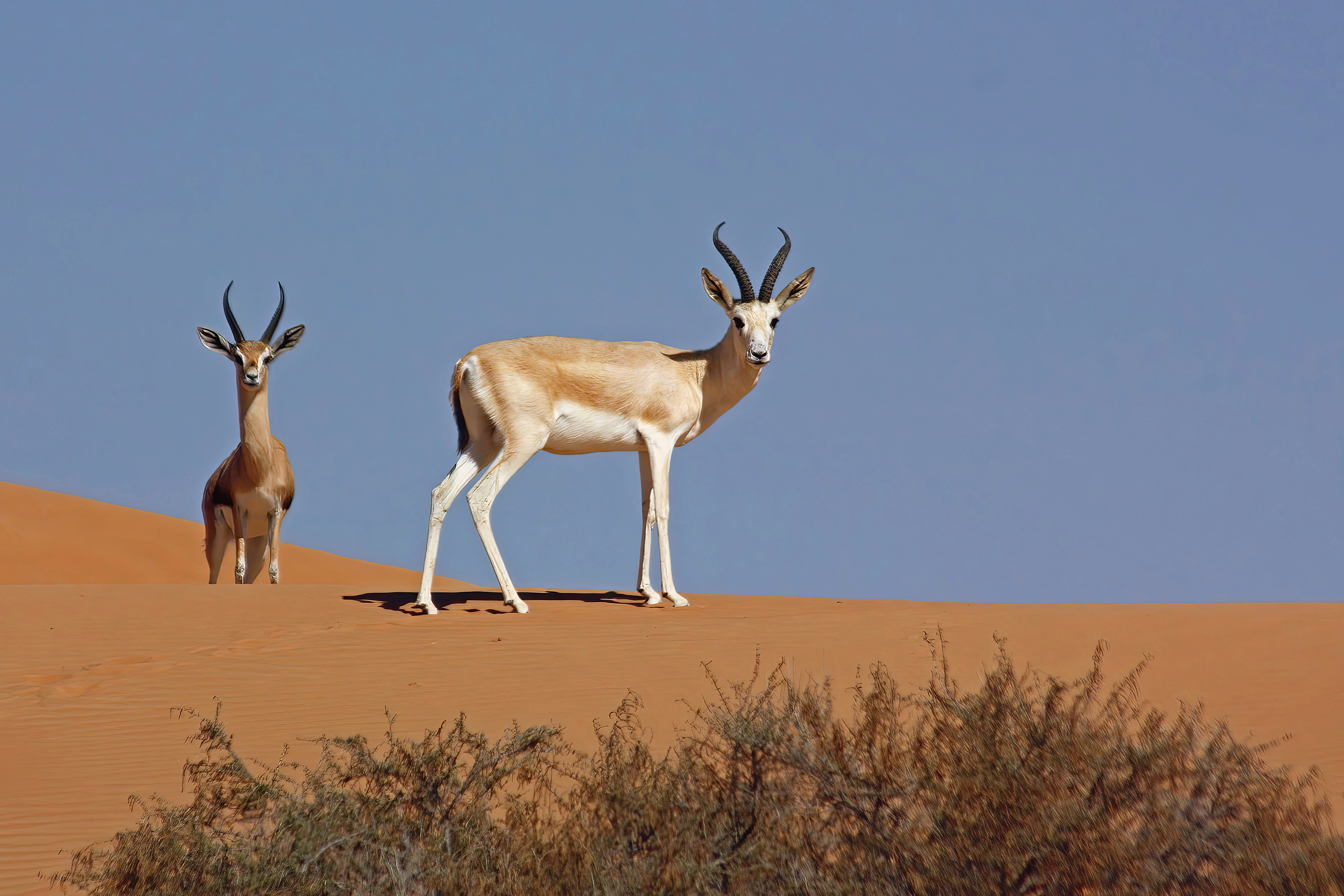
Mountain gazelle and Arabian sand gazelle

- Family: Bovidae
  - Subfamily: Antilopinae
    - Genus: Gazella
      - Mountain gazelle, G. gazella EN
      - Arabian sand gazelle, G. marica VU reintroduced
      - Goitered gazelle, G. subgutturosa VU
  - Subfamily: Caprinae
    - Genus: Capra
      - Wild goat, C. aegagrus NT
    - Genus: Ovis
      - Mouflon, O. gmelini NT
    - Genus: Rupicapra
      - Chamois, R. rupicapra LC
- Family: Cervidae (deer)
  - Subfamily: Cervinae
    - Genus: Cervus
      - Red deer, C. elaphus LC
    - Genus: Dama
      - European fallow deer, D. dama LC
  - Subfamily: Capreolinae
    - Genus: Capreolus
      - Roe deer, C. capreolus LC
- Family: Suidae
  - Subfamily: Suinae
    - Genus: Sus
      - Wild boar, S. scrofa LC

== Locally extinct ==
The following species are locally extinct in Turkey:

- Eurasian beaver, Castor fiber
- Persian fallow deer, Dama mesopotamica
- Onager, Equus hemionus
- Lion, Panthera leo
- Tiger, Panthera tigris

== See also ==
- Wildlife of Turkey
- List of chordate orders
- Lists of mammals by region
- Mammal classification
- Mammal Species of the World
