= List of mammals of South Ossetia =

This is a list of the mammal species recorded in South Ossetia.

The following tags are used to highlight each species' conservation status as assessed by the International Union for Conservation of Nature:

EX	Extinct	No reasonable doubt that the last individual has died.
EW	Extinct in the wild	Known only to survive in captivity or as a naturalized populations well outside its previous range.
CR	Critically endangered	The species is in imminent risk of extinction in the wild.
EN	Endangered	The species is facing an extremely high risk of extinction in the wild.
VU	Vulnerable	The species is facing a high risk of extinction in the wild.
NT	Near threatened	The species does not meet any of the criteria that would categorise it as risking extinction but it is likely to do so in the future.
LC	Least concern	There are no current identifiable risks to the species.
DD	Data deficient	There is inadequate information to make an assessment of the risks to this species.

Some species were assessed using an earlier set of criteria. Species assessed using this system have the following instead of near threatened and least concern categories:

LR/cd	Lower risk/conservation dependent	Species which were the focus of conservation programmes and may have moved into a higher risk category if that programme was discontinued.
LR/nt	Lower risk/near threatened	Species which are close to being classified as vulnerable but are not the subject of conservation programmes.
LC	Lower risk/least concern	Species for which there are no identifiable risks.

== Order: Rodentia (rodents) ==
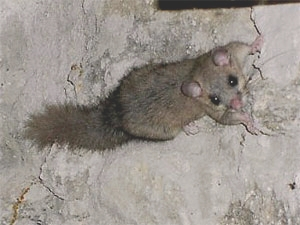
European edible dormouse

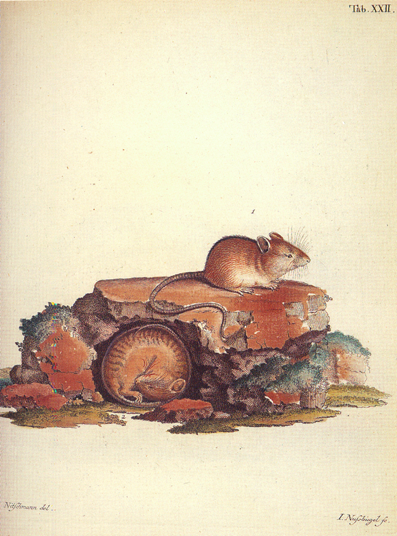
Northern birch mouse

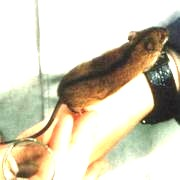
Striped field mouse

- Suborder: Sciurognathi
    - Family: Sciuridae (squirrels)
      - Subfamily: Sciurinae
        - Tribe: Sciurini
          - Genus: Sciurus
            - Caucasian squirrel, S. anomalus LC
      - Subfamily: Xerinae
        - Tribe: Marmotini
          - Genus: Spermophilus
            - Caucasian mountain ground squirrel, Spermophilus musicus LC
            - Little ground squirrel, Spermophilus pygmaeus LC
    - Family: Gliridae (dormice)
      - Subfamily: Leithiinae
        - Genus: Dryomys
          - Forest dormouse, Dryomys nitedula LR/nt
      - Subfamily: Glirinae
        - Genus: Glis
          - European edible dormouse, Glis glis LR/nt
    - Family: Dipodidae (jerboas)
      - Subfamily: Allactaginae
        - Genus: Allactaga
          - Small five-toed jerboa, Allactaga elater LC
      - Subfamily: Sicistinae
        - Genus: Sicista
          - Northern birch mouse, Sicista betulina LR/nt
          - Caucasian birch mouse, Sicista caucasica LC
          - Kazbeg birch mouse, Sicista kazbegica DD
    - Family: Cricetidae
      - Subfamily: Cricetinae
        - Genus: Cricetus
          - European hamster, Cricetus cricetus LC
          - Ciscaucasian hamster, Mesocricetus raddei LC
      - Subfamily: Arvicolinae
        - Genus: Chionomys
          - Caucasian snow vole, Chionomys gud LR/nt
          - Robert's snow vole, Chionomys roberti LR/nt
        - Genus: Ellobius
          - Transcaucasian mole vole, Ellobius lutescens LC
        - Genus: Microtus
          - Altai vole, Microtus obscurus LC
    - Family: Muridae (mice, rats, voles, gerbils, hamsters, etc.)
      - Subfamily: Murinae
        - Genus: Apodemus
          - Striped field mouse, Apodemus agrarius LC
          - Yellow-breasted field mouse, Apodemus fulvipectus LC
          - Black Sea field mouse, Apodemus ponticus LC
          - Ural field mouse, Apodemus uralensis LC
        - Genus: Micromys
          - Harvest mouse, Micromys minutus LR/nt

== Order: Erinaceomorpha (hedgehogs and gymnures) ==
The order Erinaceomorpha contains a single family, Erinaceidae, which comprise the hedgehogs and gymnures. The hedgehogs are easily recognised by their spines.

  - Family: Erinaceidae (hedgehogs)
    - Subfamily: Erinaceinae
      - Genus: Erinaceus
        - Southern white-breasted hedgehog, Erinaceus concolor LC

== Order: Soricomorpha (shrews, moles, and solenodons) ==
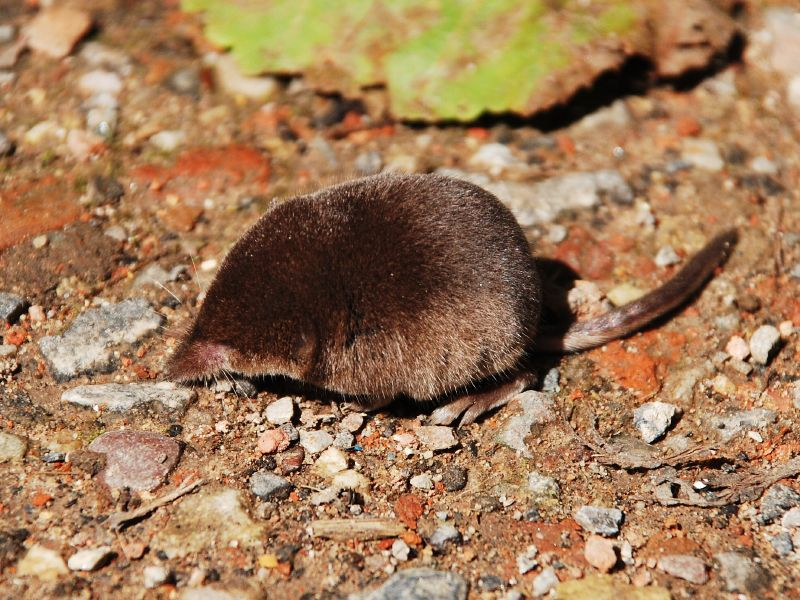
Eurasian pygmy shrew

The Soricomorpha are insectivorous mammals. The shrews and solenodons resemble mice.

  - Family: Soricidae (shrews)
    - Subfamily: Crocidurinae
      - Genus: Crocidura
        - Gueldenstaedt's shrew, Crocidura gueldenstaedtii LC
        - Bicolored shrew, Crocidura leucodon LC
        - Lesser white-toothed shrew, Crocidura suaveolens LC
      - Tribe: Soricini
        - Genus: Sorex
          - Eurasian pygmy shrew, Sorex minutus LC
          - Radde's shrew, Sorex raddei LC
          - Caucasian pygmy shrew, Sorex volnuchini LC

== Order: Chiroptera (bats) ==
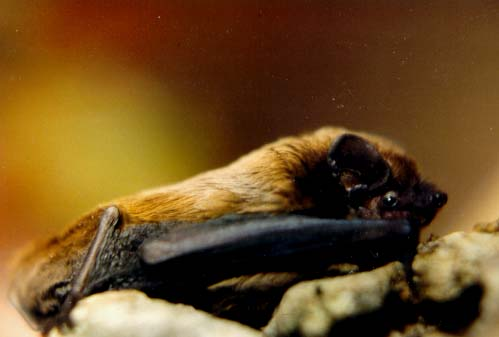
Lesser noctule

The bats' most distinguishing feature is that their forelimbs are developed as wings, making them the only mammals capable of flight.

  - Family: Vespertilionidae
    - Subfamily: Myotinae
      - Genus: Myotis
        - Bechstein's bat, Myotis bechsteini VU
        - Lesser mouse-eared bat, Myotis blythii LC
        - Geoffroy's bat, Myotis emarginatus VU
        - Natterer's bat, Myotis nattereri LC
    - Subfamily: Vespertilioninae
      - Genus: Barbastella
        - Barbastelle, Barbastella barbastellus VU
      - Genus: Eptesicus
        - Northern bat, Eptesicus nilssoni LC
      - Genus: Nyctalus
        - Greater noctule bat, Nyctalus lasiopterus LR/nt
        - Lesser noctule, Nyctalus leisleri LR/nt
      - Genus: Pipistrellus
        - Nathusius' pipistrelle, Pipistrellus nathusii LC
      - Genus: Plecotus
        - Brown long-eared bat, Plecotus auritus LC
    - Subfamily: Miniopterinae
      - Genus: Miniopterus
        - Schreibers' long-fingered bat, Miniopterus schreibersii LC
  - Family: Rhinolophidae
    - Subfamily: Rhinolophinae
      - Genus: Rhinolophus
        - Mediterranean horseshoe bat, Rhinolophus euryale VU
        - Greater horseshoe bat, Rhinolophus ferrumequinum LR/nt
        - Lesser horseshoe bat, Rhinolophus hipposideros LC
        - Mehely's horseshoe bat, Rhinolophus mehelyi VU

== Order: Carnivora (carnivorans) ==
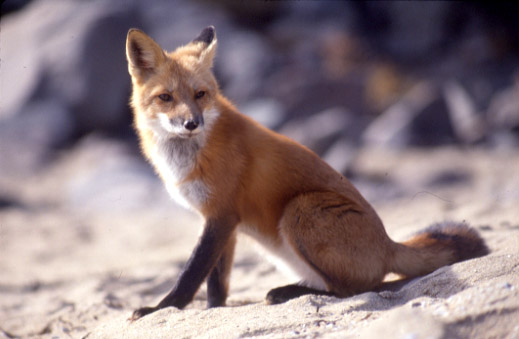
Red fox

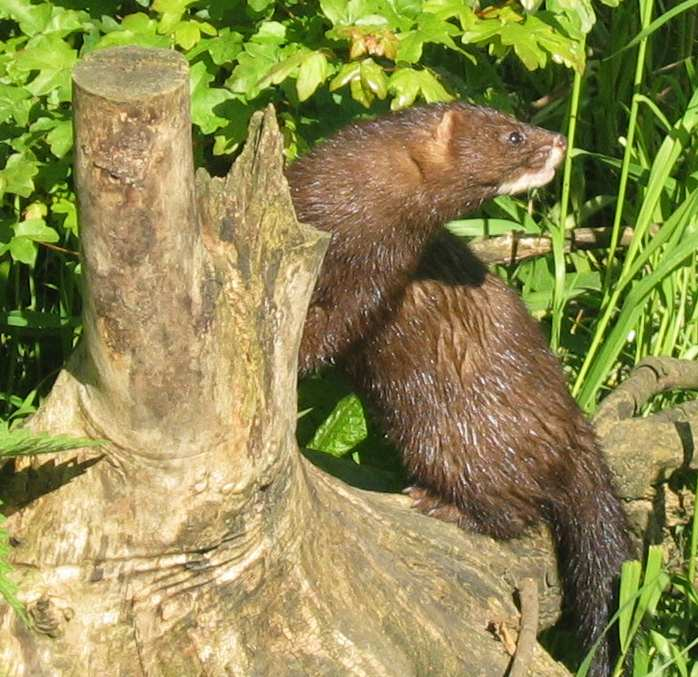
European mink

The majority of the species of carnivorans feed primarily on meat. They have a characteristic skull shape and dentition.

- Suborder: Feliformia
  - Family: Felidae (cats)
    - Subfamily: Felinae
      - Genus: Felis
        - Wildcat, Felis silvestris LC
      - Genus: Lynx
        - Eurasian lynx, Lynx lynx NT
    - Subfamily: Pantherinae
      - Genus: Panthera
        - Leopard, Panthera pardus LC
- Suborder: Caniformia
  - Family: Canidae (dogs, foxes)
    - Genus: Vulpes
      - Red fox, Vulpes vulpes LC
    - Genus: Canis
      - Gray wolf, Canis lupus LC
  - Family: Ursidae (bears)
    - Genus: Ursus
      - Brown bear, Ursus arctos LC
  - Family: Mustelidae (mustelids)
    - Genus: Mustela
      - Stoat, Mustela erminea LC
      - Steppe polecat, Mustela eversmannii LC
      - European mink, Mustela lutreola EN
      - Least weasel, Mustela nivalis LC
    - Genus: Vormela
      - Marbled polecat, Vormela peregusna LC
    - Genus: Martes
      - Beech marten, Martes foina LC
      - Pine marten, Martes martes LC
    - Genus: Meles
      - Caucasian badger, M. canescens NE
    - Genus: Lutra
      - European otter, Lutra lutra NT
  - Family: Phocidae (earless seals)
    - Genus: Monachus
      - Mediterranean monk seal, Monachus monachus CR

== Order: Artiodactyla (even-toed ungulates) ==
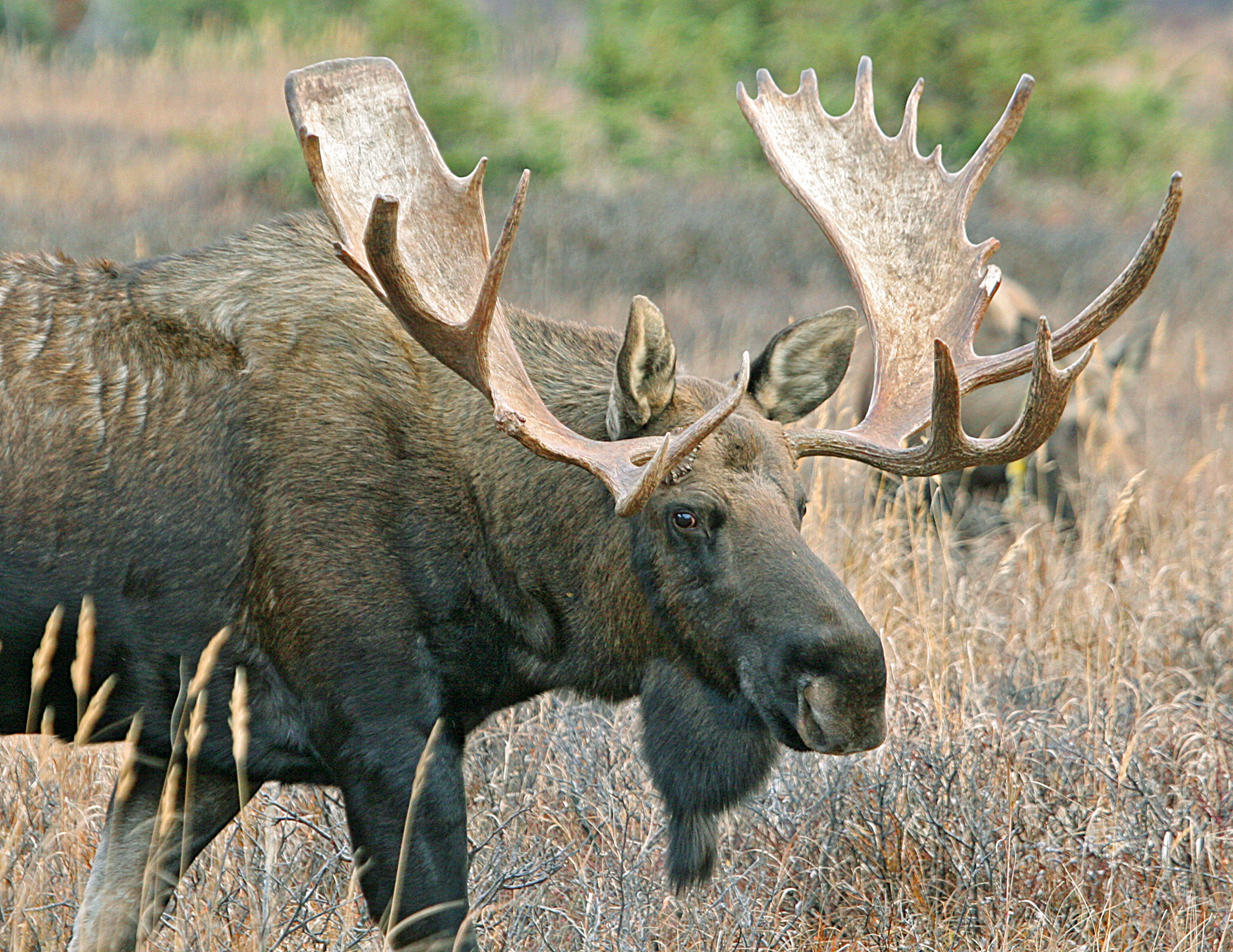
Moose were once found in the area, but are extirpated today

The even-toed ungulates are ungulates whose weight is borne about equally by the third and fourth toes, rather than mostly or entirely by the third as in perissodactyls.

- Family: Cervidae (deer)
  - Subfamily: Cervinae
    - Genus: Cervus
      - Red deer, C. elaphus LC
  - Subfamily: Capreolinae
    - Genus: Alces
      - Moose, A. alces LC extirpated
        - Caucasian moose, A. a. caucasicus EX
- Family: Bovidae (bovids)
  - Subfamily: Caprinae
    - Genus: Capra
      - Wild goat, C. aegagrus NT
      - West Caucasian tur, C. caucasica EN
      - East Caucasian tur, C. cylindricornis VU
    - Genus: Ovis
      - Argali, O. ammon NT
    - Genus: Rupicapra
      - Chamois, R. rupicapra LC

== See also ==
- List of chordate orders
- Lists of mammals by region
- Mammal classification
