= List of mammals of Georgia (country) =

There are 80 mammal species in Georgia, of which one is critically endangered, two are endangered, ten are vulnerable, and two are near threatened. All mammals in Georgia are in subclass Theria and infraclass Eutheria, being placental mammals. This list is derived from the IUCN Red List which lists species of mammals and includes those mammals that have recently been classified as extinct (since 1500 AD).

Icons which state each species' global IUCN status:
| CR | Critically Endangered | In imminent risk of extinction in the wild |
| EN | Endangered | Facing an extremely high risk of extinction in the wild |
| VU | Vulnerable | Facing a high risk of extinction in the wild |
| NT | Near Threatened | Doesn't meet any criteria that would categorise it as risking extinction but likely to in the future |
| LC | Least Concern | No current identifiable risks to this species |
| DD | Data Deficient | Inadequate information to make an assessment of the risks to this species |

== Order: Rodentia (rodents) ==
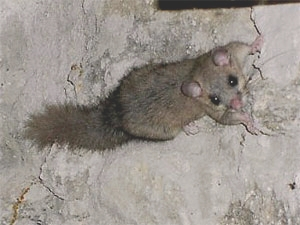
Edible dormouse

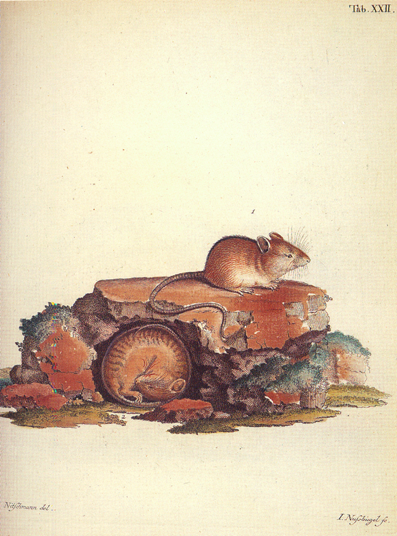
Northern birch mouse

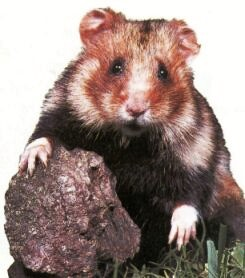
European hamster

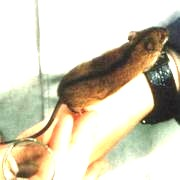
Striped field mouse

Rodents make up the largest order of mammals, with over 40% of mammalian species. They have two incisors in the upper and lower jaw which grow continually and must be kept short by gnawing. Most rodents are small though the capybara can weigh up to 45 kg (99 lb).

- Suborder: Hystricognathi
  - Family: Hystricidae (Old World porcupines)
    - Genus: Hystrix
      - Indian porcupine, H. indica LC
- Suborder: Sciurognathi
  - Family: Sciuridae (squirrels)
    - Subfamily: Sciurinae
      - Tribe: Sciurini
        - Genus: Sciurus
          - Caucasian squirrel, S. anomalus LC
    - Subfamily: Xerinae
      - Tribe: Marmotini
        - Genus: Spermophilus
          - Caucasian mountain ground squirrel, S. musicus LC
          - Little ground squirrel, Spermophilus pygmaeus LC
  - Family: Gliridae (dormice)
    - Subfamily: Leithiinae
      - Genus: Dryomys
        - Forest dormouse, Dryomys nitedula LC
    - Subfamily: Glirinae
      - Genus: Glis
        - European edible dormouse, Glis glis LC
  - Family: Dipodidae (jerboas)
    - Subfamily: Allactaginae
      - Genus: Allactaga
        - Small five-toed jerboa, Allactaga elater LC
    - Subfamily: Sicistinae
      - Genus: Sicista
        - Northern birch mouse, Sicista betulina LC
        - Kazbeg birch mouse, Sicista kazbegica VU
  - Family: Spalacidae
    - Subfamily: Spalacinae
      - Genus: Nannospalax
        - Nehring's blind mole-rat, Nannospalax nehringi LC
  - Family: Cricetidae
    - Subfamily: Cricetinae
      - Genus: Cricetus
        - European hamster, C. cricetus CR presence uncertain
      - Genus: Mesocricetus
        - Turkish hamster, Mesocricetus brandti NT
    - Subfamily: Arvicolinae
      - Genus: Chionomys
        - Caucasian snow vole, Chionomys gud LC
        - Snow vole, Chionomys nivalis LC
        - Robert's snow vole, Chionomys roberti LC
      - Genus: Ellobius
        - Transcaucasian mole vole, Ellobius lutescens LC
      - Genus: Microtus
        - Altai vole, Microtus obscurus LC
      - Genus: Prometheomys
        - Long-clawed mole vole, Prometheomys schaposchnikowi LC
  - Family: Muridae (mice, rats, voles, gerbils, hamsters, etc.)
    - Subfamily: Murinae
      - Genus: Apodemus
        - Striped field mouse, Apodemus agrarius LC
        - Yellow-breasted field mouse, Apodemus fulvipectus LC
        - Broad-toothed field mouse, Apodemus mystacinus LC
        - Black Sea field mouse, Apodemus ponticus LC
        - Ural field mouse, Apodemus uralensis LC
      - Genus: Micromys
        - Eurasian harvest mouse, Micromys minutus LC
      - Genus: Rattus
        - Brown rat, R. norvegicus LC introduced

== Order: Lagomorpha (lagomorphs) ==
The lagomorphs comprise two families, Leporidae (hares and rabbits), and Ochotonidae (pikas). Though they can resemble rodents, and were classified as a superfamily in that order until the early 20th century, they have since been considered a separate order. They differ from rodents in a number of physical characteristics, such as having four incisors in the upper jaw rather than two.

- Family: Leporidae
  - Genus: Lepus
    - European hare, L. europaeus LC

== Order: Eulipotyphla (hedgehogs, shrews and moles) ==
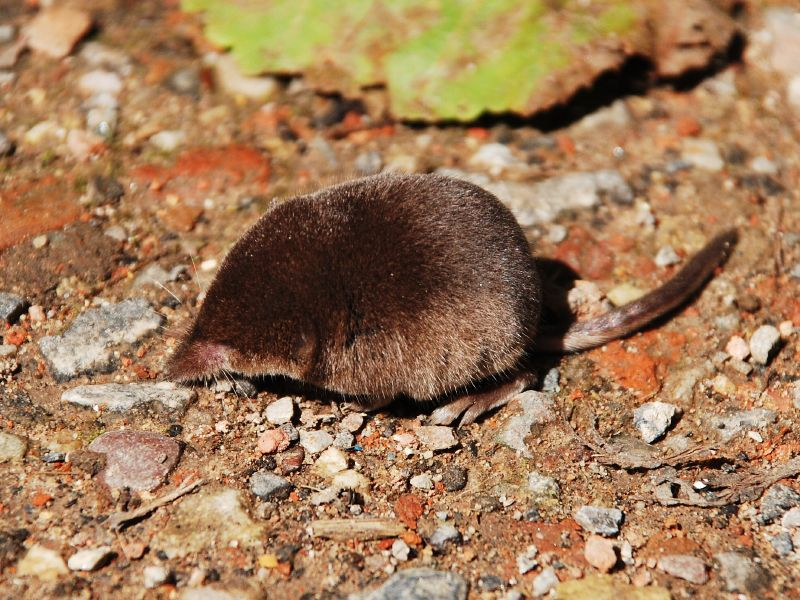
Eurasian pygmy shrew

Hedgehogs are easily recognised by their spines, shrews closely resemble mice, and moles are stout-bodied burrowers.

- Family: Erinaceidae (hedgehogs)
  - Subfamily: Erinaceinae
    - Genus: Erinaceus
      - Southern white-breasted hedgehog, E. concolor LC
- Family: Soricidae (shrews)
  - Subfamily: Crocidurinae
    - Genus: Crocidura
      - Bicolored shrew, C. leucodon
      - Lesser white-toothed shrew, C. suaveolens LC
    - Genus: Suncus
      - Etruscan shrew, Suncus etruscus LC
  - Subfamily: Soricinae
    - Tribe: Nectogalini
      - Genus: Neomys
        - Transcaucasian water shrew, Neomys schelkovnikovi LC
    - Tribe: Soricini
      - Genus: Sorex
        - Eurasian pygmy shrew, Sorex minutus LC
        - Radde's shrew, Sorex raddei LC
        - Caucasian pygmy shrew, Sorex volnuchini LC

== Order: Chiroptera (bats) ==
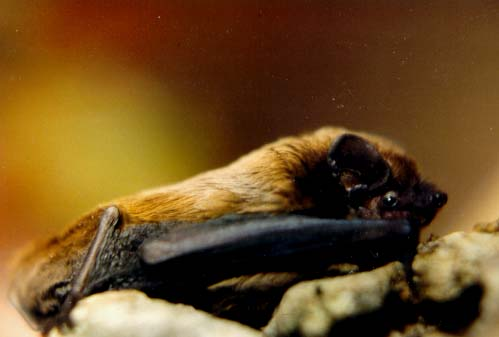
Lesser noctule

The bats' most distinguishing feature is that their forelimbs are developed as wings, making them the only mammals capable of flight. Bat species account for about 20% of all mammals.

- Family: Vespertilionidae
  - Subfamily: Myotinae
    - Genus: Myotis
      - Bechstein's bat, M. bechsteini NT
      - Lesser mouse-eared bat, M. blythii LC
      - Geoffroy's bat, M. emarginatus LC
      - Natterer's bat, M. nattereri LC
  - Subfamily: Vespertilioninae
    - Genus: Barbastella
      - Western barbastelle, B. barbastellus NT
      - Asian barbastelle, B. leucomelas LC
    - Genus: Eptesicus
      - Northern bat, E. nilssoni LC
    - Genus: Hypsugo
      - Savi's pipistrelle, H. savii LC
    - Genus: Nyctalus
      - Greater noctule bat, N. lasiopterus VU
      - Lesser noctule, N. leisleri LC
    - Genus: Pipistrellus
      - Kuhl's pipistrelle, P. kuhlii LC
      - Nathusius' pipistrelle, P. nathusii LC
      - Common pipistrelle, P. pipistrellus LC
    - Genus: Plecotus
      - Brown long-eared bat, P. auritus LC
      - Grey long-eared bat, P. austriacus NT
  - Subfamily: Miniopterinae
    - Genus: Miniopterus
      - Common bent-wing bat, M. schreibersii VU
- Family: Rhinolophidae
  - Subfamily: Rhinolophinae
    - Genus: Rhinolophus
      - Mediterranean horseshoe bat, R. euryale NT
      - Greater horseshoe bat, R. ferrumequinum LC
      - Lesser horseshoe bat, R. hipposideros LC
      - Mehely's horseshoe bat, R. mehelyi VU

== Order: Cetacea (whales) ==
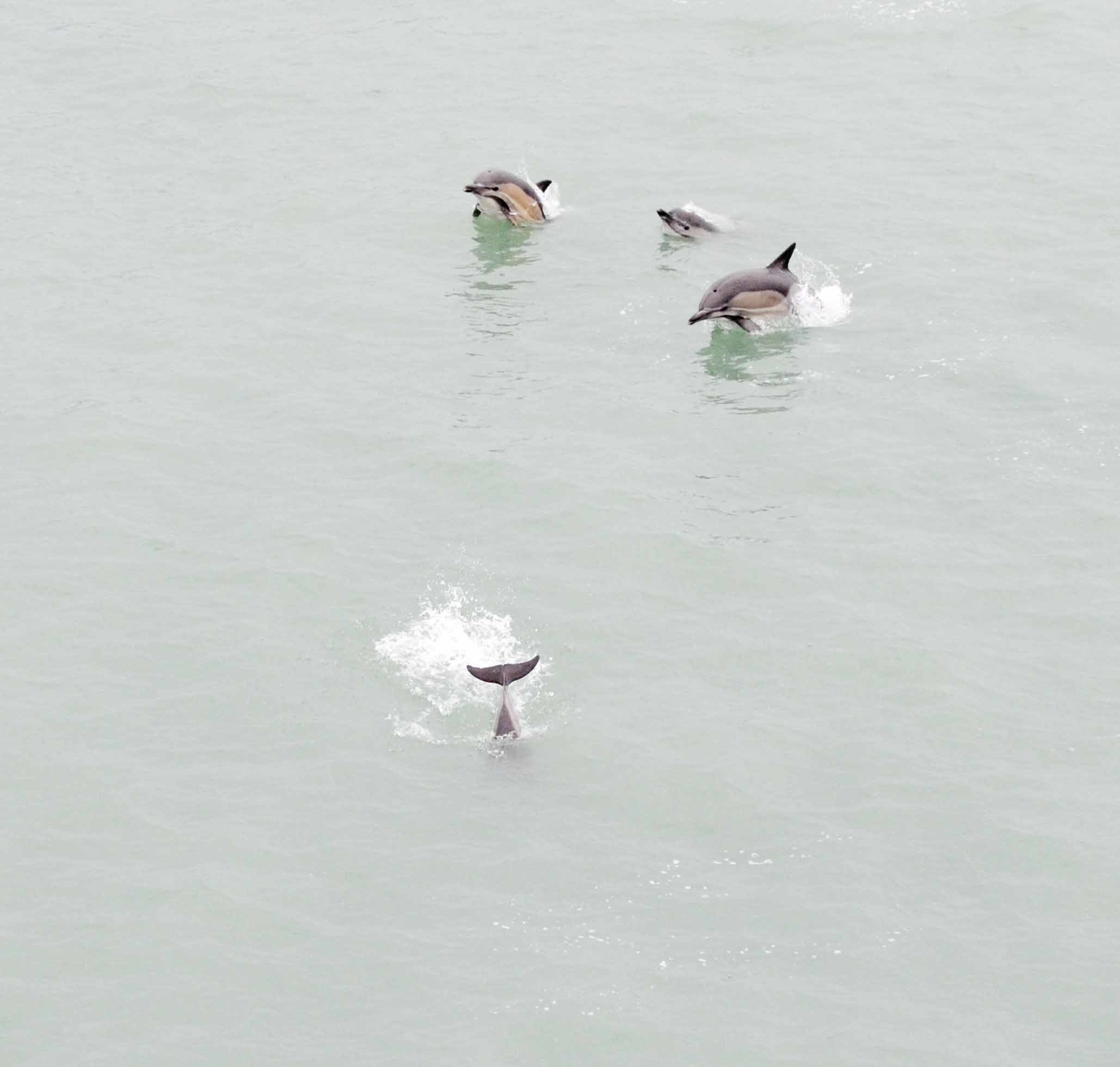
Common dolphins porpoising along a ferry at the port of Batumi

The order Cetacea includes whales, dolphins and porpoises. They are the mammals most fully adapted to aquatic life with a spindle-shaped nearly hairless body, protected by a thick layer of blubber, and forelimbs and tail modified to provide propulsion underwater.

- Suborder: Mysticeti
  - Family: Balaenopteridae (rorquals)
    - Genus: Balaenoptera
      - Common minke whale, Balaenoptera acutorostrata LC (vagrant)
- Suborder: Odontoceti
  - Superfamily: Platanistoidea
    - Family: Phocoenidae
      - Genus: Phocoena
        - Harbour porpoise, Phocoena phocoena LC
    - Family: Delphinidae (marine dolphins)
      - Genus: Delphinus
        - Short-beaked common dolphin, Delphinus delphis LC
      - Genus: Tursiops
        - Common bottlenose dolphin, Tursiops truncatus LC

== Order: Carnivora (carnivorans) ==
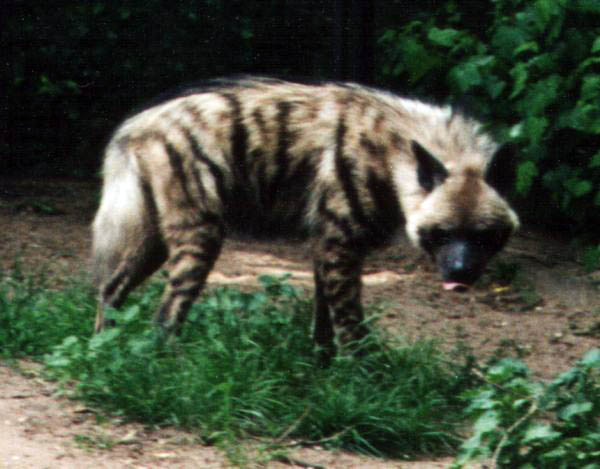
Striped hyena

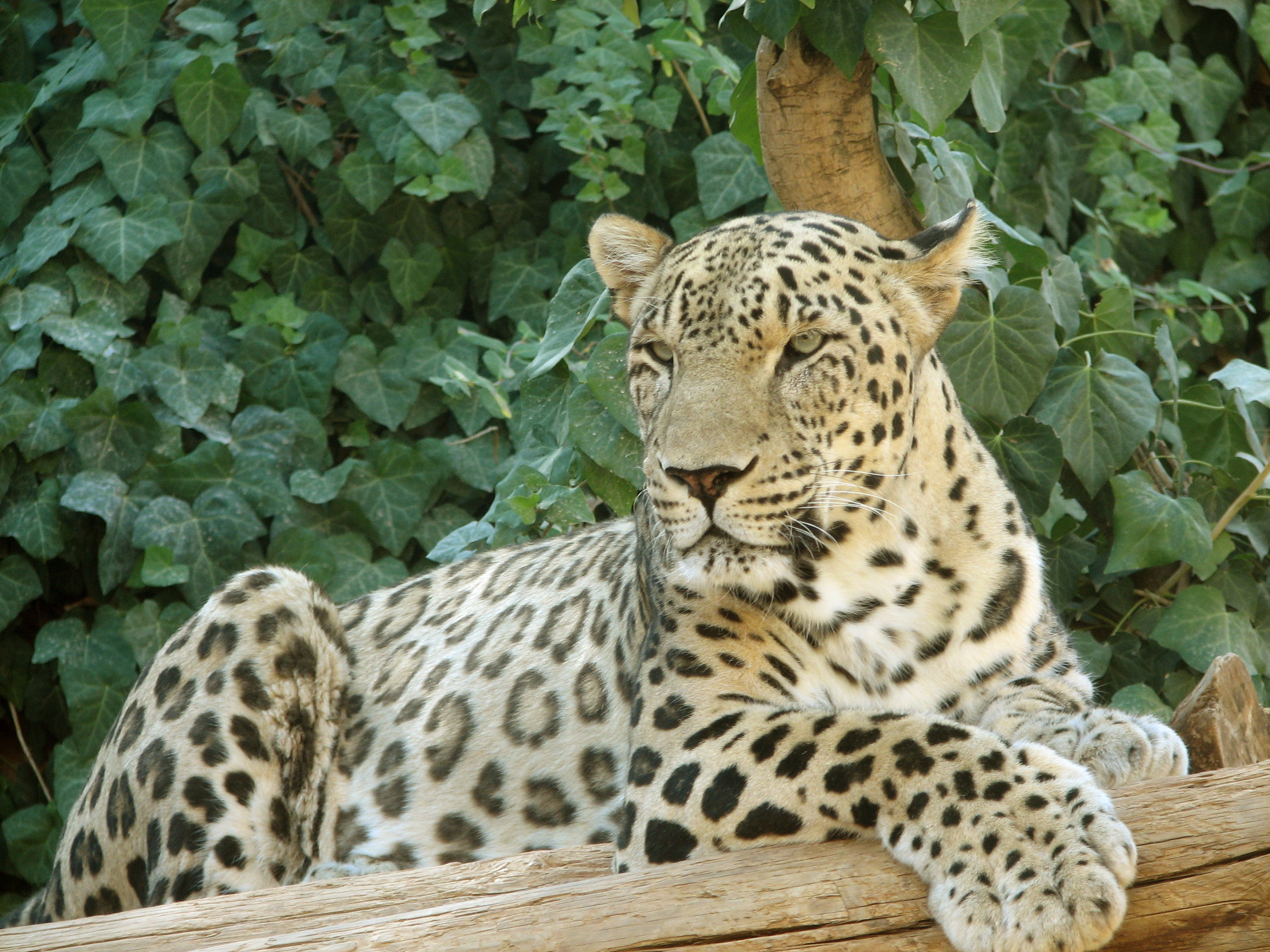
Leopard

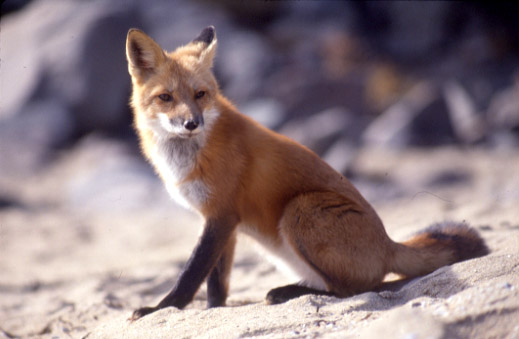
Red fox

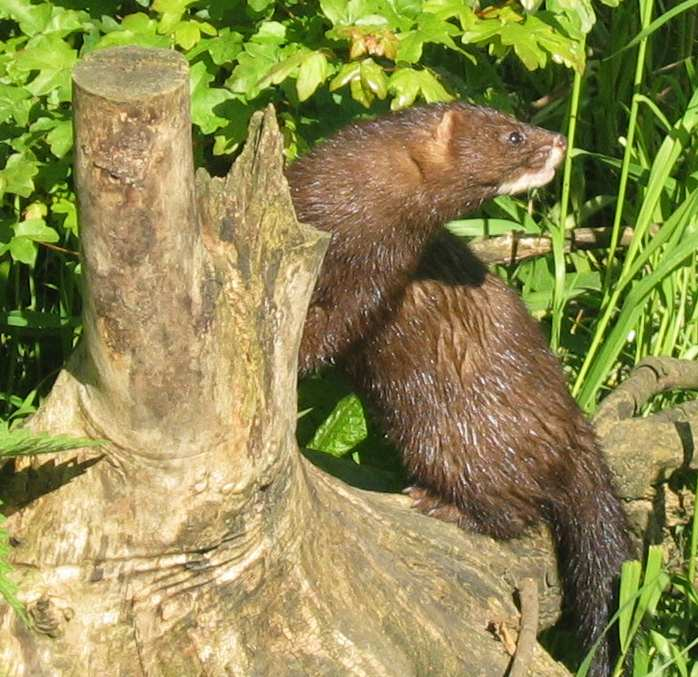
European mink

There are over 260 species of carnivorans, the majority of which feed primarily on meat. They have a characteristic skull shape and dentition.

- Suborder: Feliformia
  - Family: Felidae (cats)
    - Subfamily: Felinae
      - Genus: Felis
        - Jungle cat, F. chaus LC
        - European wildcat, F. silvestris LC
          - Caucasian wildcat, F. s. caucasica
      - Genus: Lynx
        - Eurasian lynx, L. lynx LC
          - Caucasian lynx, L. l. dinniki
    - Subfamily: Pantherinae
      - Genus: Panthera
        - Leopard, P. pardus VU presence uncertain
          - P. p. tulliana EN presence uncertain
  - Family: Hyaenidae (hyaenas)
    - Genus: Hyaena
      - Striped hyena, H. hyaena NT
- Suborder: Caniformia
  - Family: Canidae (dogs, foxes)
    - Genus: Canis
      - Golden jackal, C. aureus LC
        - European jackal, C. a. moreoticus
      - Gray wolf, C. lupus LC
        - Steppe wolf, C. l. campestris
    - Genus: Vulpes
      - Red fox, V. vulpes LC
  - Family: Ursidae (bears)
    - Genus: Ursus
      - Brown bear, U. arctos LC
  - Family: Procyonidae
    - Genus: Procyon
      - Common raccoon, P. lotor LC introduced
  - Family: Mustelidae (mustelids)
    - Genus: Lutra
      - Eurasian otter, L. lutra NT
    - Genus: Martes
      - Beech marten, M. foina LC
      - European pine marten, M. martes LC
    - Genus: Meles
      - Caucasian badger, M. canescens
    - Genus: Mustela
      - Stoat, M. erminea LC
      - Steppe polecat, M. eversmannii LC
      - Least weasel, M. nivalis LC
    - Genus: Vormela
      - Marbled polecat, V. peregusna VU

== Order: Artiodactyla (even-toed ungulates) ==
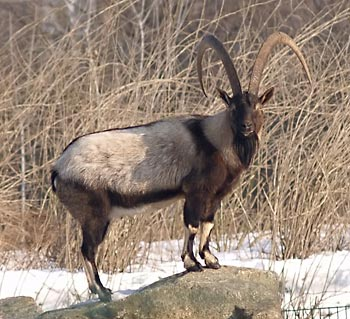
Wild goat

The even-toed ungulates are ungulates whose weight is borne about equally by the third and fourth toes, rather than mostly or entirely by the third as in perissodactyls. There are about 220 artiodactyl species, including many that are of great economic importance to humans.

- Family: Bovidae (cattle, antelope, sheep, goats)
  - Subfamily: Antilopinae
    - Genus: Gazella
      - Goitered gazelle, G. subgutturosa VU reintroduced
  - Subfamily: Caprinae
    - Genus: Capra
      - Wild goat, C. aegagrus NT
      - West Caucasian tur, C. caucasica EN
      - East Caucasian tur, C. cylindricornis NT
    - Genus: Rupicapra
      - Chamois, R. rupicapra LC
- Family: Cervidae (deer)
  - Subfamily: Capreolinae
    - Genus: Capreolus
      - Roe deer, C. capreolus LC
  - Subfamily: Cervinae
    - Genus: Cervus
      - Red deer, C. elaphus LC
- Family: Suidae (pigs)
  - Subfamily: Suinae
    - Genus: Sus
      - Wild boar, S. scrofa LC

== Locally extinct ==
The following species are locally extinct in the country:

- Asiatic cheetah, Acinonyx jubatus
- Moose, Alces alces
- Caucasian wisent, Bison bonanus
- Wild horse, Equus ferus
- Onager, Equus hemionus
- Mediterranean monk seal, Monachus monachus
- European mink, Mustela lutreola
- Northern lion, Panthera leo
- Caspian tiger, Panthera tigris

== See also ==
- List of chordate orders
- Lists of mammals by region
- Mammal classification
