= Snow vole =

Snow vole most commonly refers to the European snow vole (Chionomys nivalis)

This term can also refer to:

- Chionomys, the genus of the European snow vole and any of the other 2-4 species in that genus
- Dinaromys, another genus of voles containing 1 or 2 species
