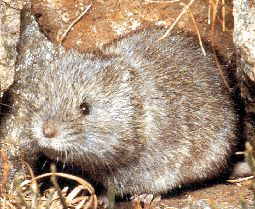

Conservation status
- Least Concern (IUCN 3.1)

Scientific classification
- Kingdom: Animalia
- Phylum: Chordata
- Class: Mammalia
- Order: Rodentia
- Family: Cricetidae
- Subfamily: Arvicolinae
- Genus: Chionomys
- Species: C. nivalis

Binomial name
- Chionomys nivalis (Martins, 1842)

Synonyms
- Chionomys syriacus (Brants, 1827); Hypudaeus syriacus Brants, 1827

= European snow vole =

Species of mammal

The European snow vole or snow vole (Chionomys nivalis) is a species of rodent in the family Cricetidae. It has dense, pale grey fur and a pale-coloured tail and can reach about 14 cm (5.5 in) long, with a tail which is 7 cm (2.8 in) long.

The European snow vole is native to mountainous parts of southern and eastern Europe and southwestern Asia. It is found in the Pyrenees, the Alps, the Apennine Mountains, the Carpathian Mountains, the Montesinho mountains, the higher regions of the Balkans and Asia Minor. Its habitat is rocky areas and screes, mostly above the tree line. It is mainly a solitary animal and lives under boulders and in crevices and tunnels among rocks and scree.

== Taxonomy ==
The European snow vole was first described by Charles Frédéric Martins in 1842 as Arvicola nivalis. Gromov and Polyakov erected the genus Chionomys in 1972 and the name Chionomys nivalis is now accepted, although the exact affinities of the species are not fully established. Fossil evidence suggests that Chionomys nivalis had evolved in Europe by the late Pleistocene and that the other two members of the genus, Robert's snow vole (Chionomys roberti) and the Caucasian snow vole (Chionomys gud), evolved in the Caucasus and Near East regions with Robert's snow vole splitting off from the ancestral line by the middle Pleistocene. All members of the genus have a distribution in the south-western palearctic and are restricted to a broad band of territory about 5,500 kilometres (3,400 mi) long and 2,500 kilometres (1,600 mi) wide. All three species are present in the Caucasus and the Pontic Mountains in northeastern Turkey.

== Description ==
The European snow vole has soft, long, dense fur that is pale grey tinged with brown. It has a rounded nose, black beady eyes, long whitish whiskers and moderately large ears. The comparatively long tail is whitish and clad in short, sparse hairs. The head and body length is 4.25 to 5.5 in (108 to 140 mm) and the tail 2 to 3 in (51 to 76 mm). Adults weigh between 1 and 2 ounces (28 and 57 g). Its voice is a squeak and its teeth can sometimes be heard chattering.

== Distribution and habitat ==
The European snow vole is native to mountainous ranges in southern Europe, the Pyrenees, Apennines, Alps, Carpathians, Balkan Mountains, Mount Olympus, Pindus Range and the Montesinho mountains. In Asia it is native to mountainous parts of the Caucasus, Lebanon, Syria, western and northern Iran and southern Turkmenistan. The only Mediterranean island on which it is present is Euboea, off the coast of Greece. It lives mainly above the tree line on and among rocks and scree in alpine meadows, on boulder-covered slopes, in crevices in rocks and in areas with dwarf mountain pines (Pinus mugo), alpine rose (Rhododendron ferrugineum) and scrubby vegetation. In France it is present at lower elevations in some karst regions such as near Glun, in the Ardèche department and near Nîmes. This vole is considered to be a glacial relict species and since the retreat of the most recent glaciation, suitable habitat became fragmented. It is restricted to petricolic soils, and it is found at lower altitudes where these soils are present. Its presence in any location is due to the suitability of the microhabitat rather than the suitability of the temperature. However it is more often found at medium to high altitudes because there is less competition from other animals such as grasshoppers, the alpine marmot (Marmota marmota), the ibex (Capru spp.) and the chamois (Rupicapra spp.). When suitable petricolic soils occur in forests it is less likely to be plentiful because it faces competition from such mammals as the edible dormouse (Glis glis) and the garden dormouse (Eliomys quercinus).

A study of the European snow vole concluded that it was a rock-dwelling specialist. The researchers showed that reproductive females and juveniles preferentially used the central parts of scree areas, especially in the vicinity of scree junipers (Juniperus communis), whereas males and non-reproductive females were less discriminating and occupied rocky habitat in proportion to its availability.

== Behaviour ==
In the summer breeding season, female European snow voles have mutually exclusive territories and display considerable aggression towards other females of their own species when they meet near the territorial boundaries. Males have rather larger, overlapping ranges, and are more socially tolerant. In the winter the territorial boundaries break down and individual males and females become nomadic and solitary. They are aggressive towards other members of their species that they may encounter. When a female meets another female they will often fight but when a male encounters another male, more investigative behaviour takes place. However, if they do fight, it will be a more intense battle. Males encountering females show intermediate behaviours. These behaviours are probably related to the competition necessary to find enough food in the snow voles' challenging environment, and is in contrast to some other vole species living in more temperate climates. Some of these live solitary lives during the summer and form communal groups in the winter.

This vole is active by night as well as by day and in the summer it is quite easy to spot lying on rocks, especially on sunny days. It digs tunnels with numerous exit holes among rocks and between tree roots. It does not hibernate in wintertime and may take shelter in mountain huts. It holds its tail in an upright position when running. It feeds on the green parts of plants, grasses, buds, shoots and roots, and may sometimes eat insects and their larvae. In the summer it gathers bits of grass and leaves, leaving them to dry in the sun before storing them in underground chambers for winter use as food.

The European snow vole is promiscuous in its mating habits with both males and females mating with multiple partners. There are usually two litters in a year, with litters of about four (range two to seven) young being born after a gestation period of three weeks. The young are altricial, their eyes open after about thirteen days, they are weaned at eighteen days and become independent after four weeks. They do not generally breed until the following year and may live for two to four years.

== Status ==
The IUCN lists the European snow vole as being of "Least Concern" in its Red List of Threatened Species. This is because, despite its rather fragmented range, it is common in some suitable habitats, its population trend seems stable and it does not seem to be facing any particular threats.
