= Charles Frédéric Martins =

French physician, botanist, geologist, naturalist and translator

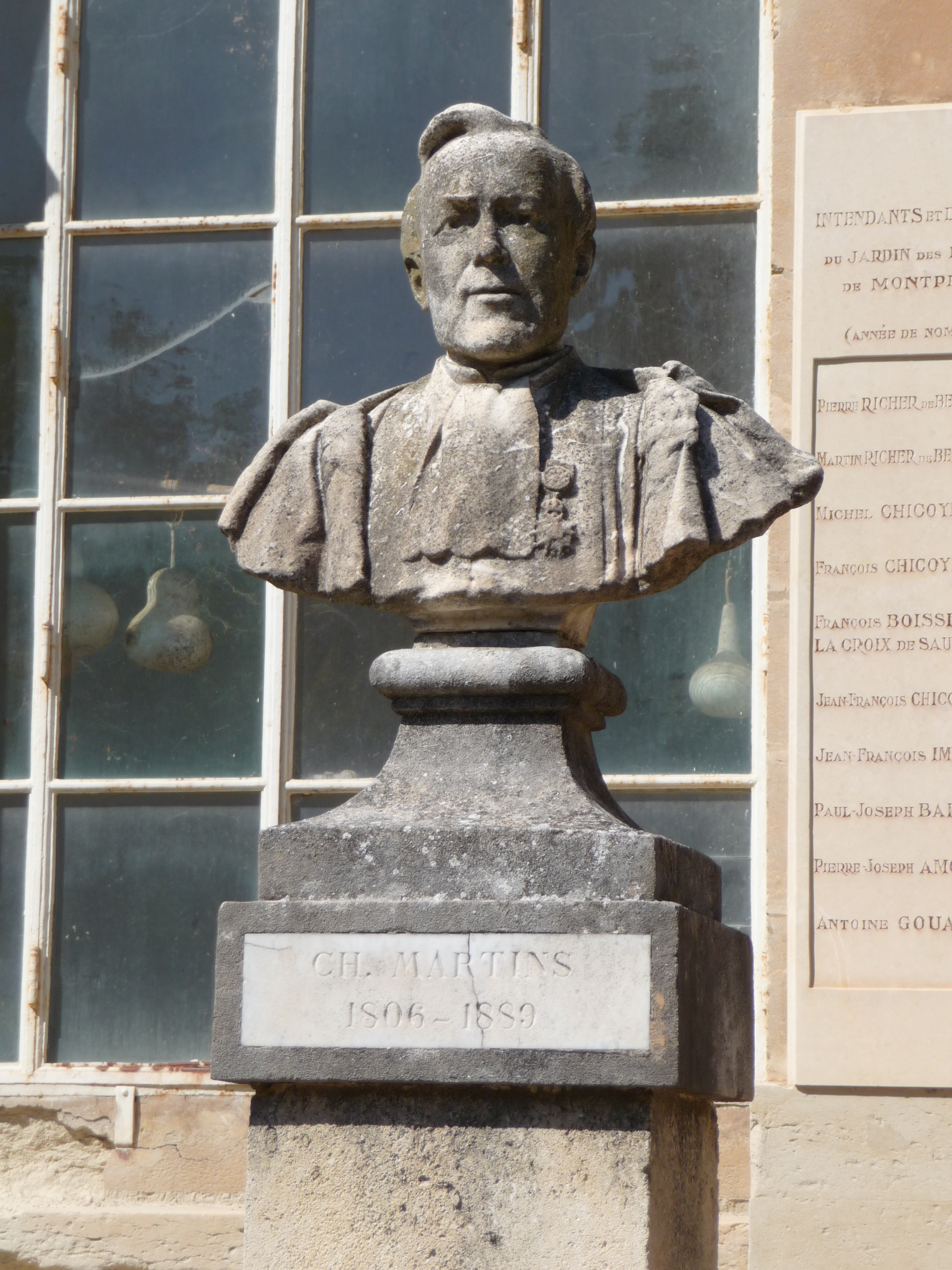
- Bust of Charles Frédéric Martins at Jardin des plantes de Montpellier
- Born: February 6, 1806; Paris
- Died: March 7, 1889 (aged 83); Paris
- Scientific career
- Fields: Medicine, Botany, Geology, and Meteorology
- Author abbrev. (botany): Martins

Charles Frédéric Martins (1806–1889) was a French medical doctor, botanist, geologist, naturalist, and translator.

== Biography ==
Born in Paris, Martins was of Protestant of German descent. He went to school in Paris and Geneva (where he was influenced by the botanist Augustin Pyramus de Candolle) and studied medicine at the University of Paris with medical internship at the Hôpitaux de Paris. There he obtained his doctorate in 1834 with dissertation Principes de la méthode naturelle appliqués à la classification des maladies de la peau (Principles of the natural method applied to the classification of diseases of the skin). In 1839 he received his agrégation in natural history in Paris. He taught natural history at the Medical Faculty of the Sorbonne. In 1846, at the University of Montpellier, he became professeur agrégé (associate professor) for natural sciences (botany and zoology) and in 1851 professor for medical botany and natural history and director of the Jardin des plantes de Montpellier. In 1879 he retired and resided in Paris.

He took part in various expeditions to the Alps, Spitzbergen, and to the Sahara (in Egypt and in Algeria). He published a travel report Du Spitzberg au Sahara about his expeditions. In addition to botany, he also published on geology and meteorology. He translated the textbook on meteorology by the physicist and meteorologist Ludwig Friedrich Kämtz. Martins edited a new edition of Achille Richard's Nouveaux Éléments de Botanique. At the botanical garden in Montpellier, he supervised the building of a large glass house and an observatory.

He was a corresponding member of the Geological Society of London and, as a supporter of the theory of evolution, corresponded with Charles Darwin and Carl Vogt (a friend of Martins). He translated into French numerous German works. Martins translated Goethe's scientific writings. Martins wrote a preface for Edmond Barbier's translation of Charles Darwin's book on insectivorous plants and a preface for Charles Letourneau's translation of Ernst Haeckel's book on the doctrine of evolution. He was the editor of a new edition, published in 1873, of the Philosophie zoologique by Jean-Baptiste Lamarck.

In 1839 Martins was elected a member of the Leopoldina. In 1853 he became a member of the Academy of Sciences of Montpellier and in 1870 he was its president. In 1863 he was elected a corresponding member of the Académie des sciences.

== Selected publications ==
=== Books and monographs ===
- 1837. Œuvres d'histoire naturelle de Johann Wolfgang von Goethe, compr. divers mémoires d'anatomie comparée, de botanique et de géologie. Trad. et annotés par Ch.-Fr. Martins. Volume 1. publ. Cherbuliez. 468 pp.
- 1840. Observations sur les glaciers du Spitzberg, comparés à ceux de la Suisse et de la Norvège. 36 pp.
- 1842. Remarques et expériences sur les glaciers sans névé de la chaine du Faulhorn. 26 pp.
- 1843. Un hivernage scientifique en Laponie. 31 pp.
- 1843. Ludwig F. Kaemtz, Cours complet de météorologie. traduction de Martins, publ. Paulin. 576 pp. online text
- 1848. Mémoire Sur Les Temperatures de La Mer Glaciale. publ. Typ. de Firmin Didot Hnos. 73 pp. online text. Réédité en 2010 Kessinger Publ. 74 pp. ISBN 1160184186
- 1858. Promenade botanique le long des côtes de l'Asie-Mineure, de la Syrie et de l'Égypte. publ. Martel. 32 pp.
- 1860. Des causes du froid sur les hautes montagnes. 28 pp.
- 1865. Deux ascensions scientifiques au Mont-Blanc: leurs résultats immédiats pour la météorologie, la physique et les sciences naturelles. publ. J. Cayle. 38 pp. online text
- 1866. Du Spitzberg au Sahara: étapes d'un naturaliste au Spitzberg, en Laponie, en Écosse, en Suisse, en France, en Italie, en Orient, en Égypte et en Algérie. publ. J.-B. Baillière e Hijos. 619 pp. online text

=== Articles ===
- 1849. On the vegetable colonisation of the British Islands, Shetland, Feroe, and Iceland. Edinburgh New Philosophical Journal 46: 40–52
- 1859. Vegetable colonization of the British Isles, of Shetland, Faroe and Iceland. publ. Smithsonian Institution. 9 pp.
- 1864. Tableau physique du Sahara orientale de la province de Constantine. Paris
