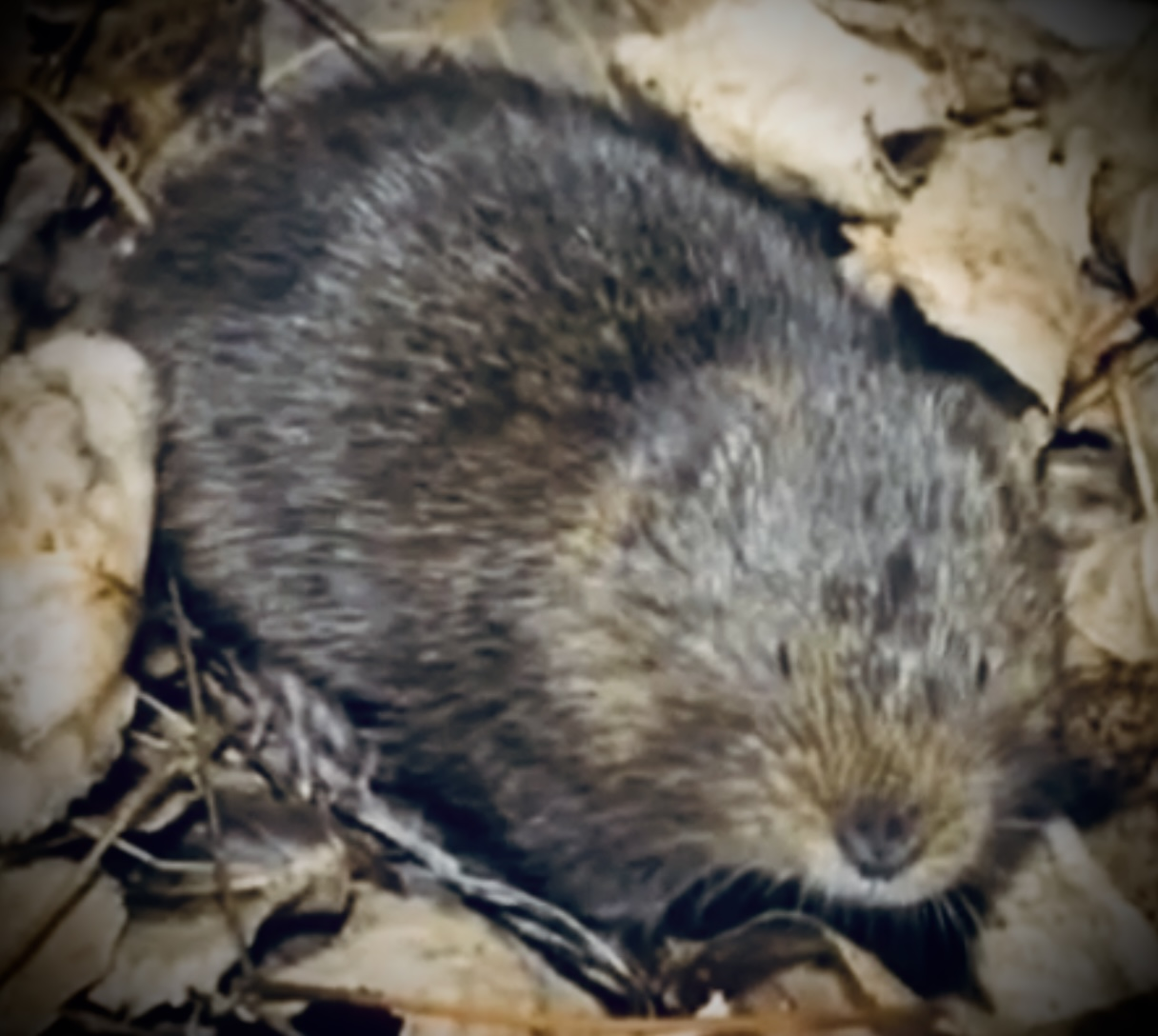

Conservation status
- Least Concern (IUCN 3.1)

Scientific classification
- Kingdom: Animalia
- Phylum: Chordata
- Class: Mammalia
- Order: Rodentia
- Family: Cricetidae
- Subfamily: Arvicolinae
- Tribe: Prometheomyini; Kretzoi, 1955
- Genus: Prometheomys; Satunin, 1901
- Species: P. schaposchnikowi

Binomial name
- Prometheomys schaposchnikowi Satunin, 1901

= Long-clawed mole vole =

Long-clawed mole vole Temporal range: Late Pleistocene - Recent

Species of rodent

The long-clawed mole vole (Prometheomys schaposchnikowi) is a species of rodent in the family Cricetidae. It is the only species in the genus Prometheomys. It is found in Georgia, Russia, and Turkey.
