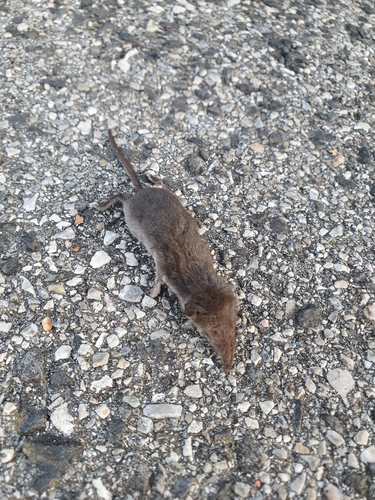

Conservation status
- Least Concern (IUCN 3.1)

Scientific classification
- Kingdom: Animalia
- Phylum: Chordata
- Class: Mammalia
- Order: Eulipotyphla
- Family: Soricidae
- Genus: Crocidura
- Species: C. gueldenstaedtii

Binomial name
- Crocidura gueldenstaedtii (Pallas, 1811)

Synonyms
- Crocidura suaveolens gueldenstaedtii, Sorex gueldenstaedtii Pallas, 1811

= Güldenstädt's shrew =

Species of mammal

Güldenstädt's shrew (Crocidura gueldenstaedtii) is a species of mammal in the family Soricidae. It is sometimes considered a subspecies of the lesser white-toothed shrew (C. suaveolens), but more recent studies support it being a distinct species. It is named after Johann Anton Güldenstädt.

It has a wide range throughout Europe, from Spain west to Russia, and south through the Caucasus to the Middle East, as far south as the Sinai Peninsula in Egypt. Mummified shrews from the beginning of the Ptolemaic Period at Quesna, Egypt, have also been identified to this species, indicating that it once occurred in the Nile Delta, where it no longer does, supporting a moister regional environment at the time.

It contains several subspecies from western Europe and the island of Cyprus that may represent distinct species of their own.
