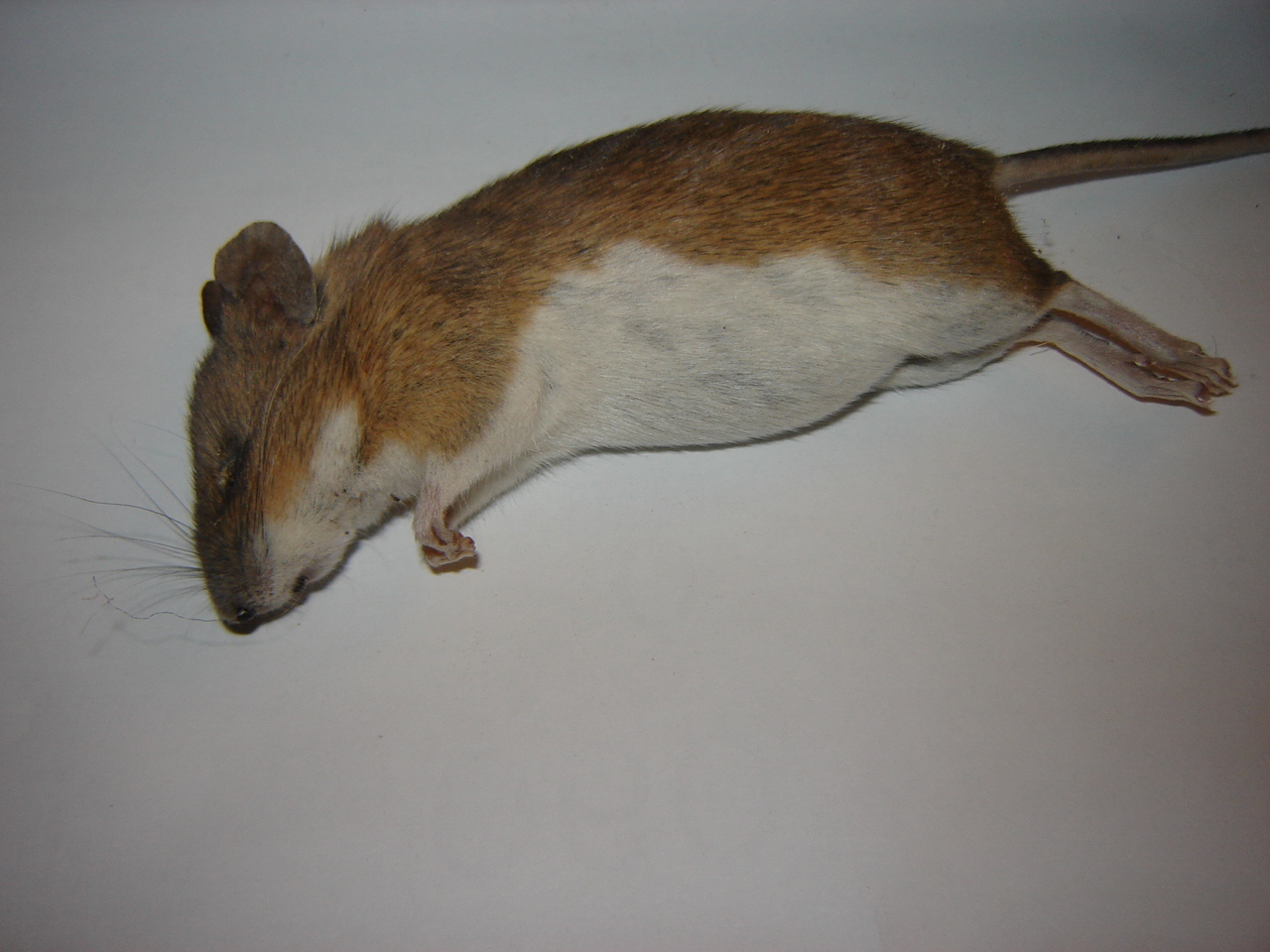

Conservation status
- Least Concern (IUCN 3.1)

Scientific classification
- Kingdom: Animalia
- Phylum: Chordata
- Class: Mammalia
- Order: Rodentia
- Family: Muridae
- Genus: Apodemus
- Species: A. witherbyi

Binomial name
- Apodemus witherbyi (Thomas, 1902)

Synonyms
- Apodemus (Sylvaemus) falzfeini Apodemus fulvipectus Apodemus hermonensis Apodemus iconicus

= Steppe field mouse =

Species of rodent

The steppe field mouse (Apodemus witherbyi) is a species of rodent in the family Muridae found in Georgia, Armenia, Azerbaijan, Israel, Palestine, Turkey, Jordan, Iran, Turkmenistan, Lebanon, Syria, the Greek island of Rhodes, Ukraine and possibly Afghanistan and Iraq. The Mount Hermon field mouse (sometimes recognized as a distinct species: A. hermonensis) and the yellow-breasted field mouse (sometimes recognized as a distinct species: A. fulvipectus) were considered conspecific with the steppe field mouse by Musser and Carleton (2005).
