= Black Sea field mouse =

Conservation status
- Least Concern (IUCN 3.1)

Scientific classification
- Kingdom: Animalia
- Phylum: Chordata
- Class: Mammalia
- Order: Rodentia
- Family: Muridae
- Genus: Apodemus
- Species: A. ponticus

Binomial name
- Apodemus ponticus (Sviridenko, 1936)

Species of rodent

The Black Sea field mouse (Apodemus ponticus) is a species of rodent in the family Muridae. It is found in Armenia, Azerbaijan, Georgia, possibly Iran, Iraq, Russian Federation, and Turkey.
