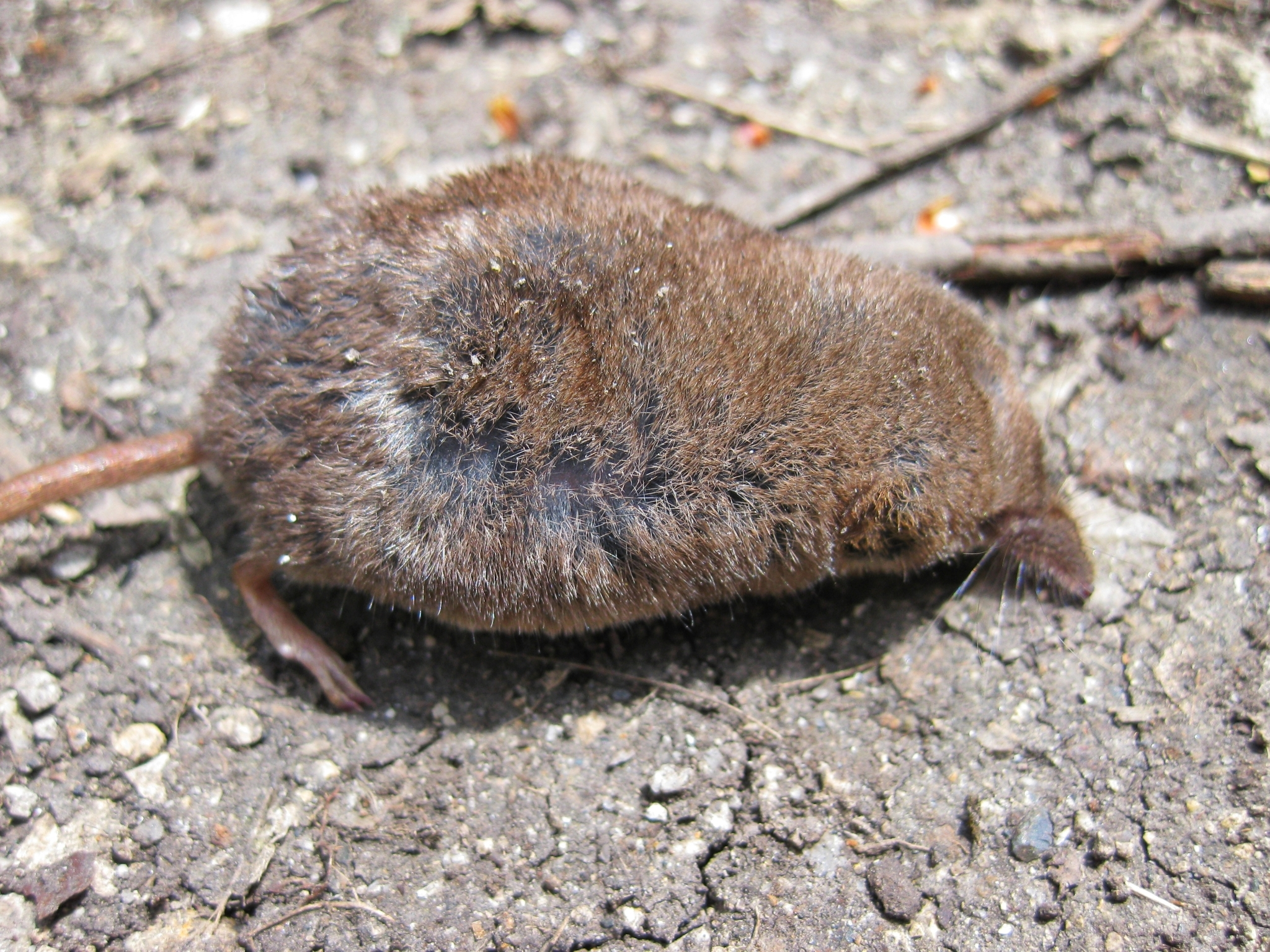

Conservation status
- Least Concern (IUCN 3.1)

Scientific classification
- Kingdom: Animalia
- Phylum: Chordata
- Class: Mammalia
- Order: Eulipotyphla
- Family: Soricidae
- Genus: Sorex
- Species: S. volnuchini

Binomial name
- Sorex volnuchini Ognev, 1922
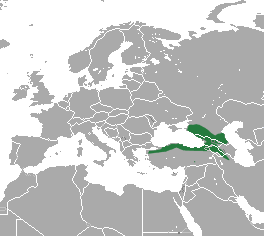
- Caucasian pygmy shrew range

= Caucasian pygmy shrew =

Species of mammal

The Caucasian pygmy shrew or Ukrainian shrew (Sorex volnuchini) is a species of mammal in the family Soricidae. It is found in Armenia, Azerbaijan, Georgia, Russia, Ukraine, East Azerbaijan Province in Iran, and Turkey.
