= Radde's shrew =

Conservation status
- Least Concern (IUCN 3.1)

Scientific classification
- Kingdom: Animalia
- Phylum: Chordata
- Class: Mammalia
- Order: Eulipotyphla
- Family: Soricidae
- Genus: Sorex
- Species: S. raddei

Binomial name
- Sorex raddei Satunin, 1895
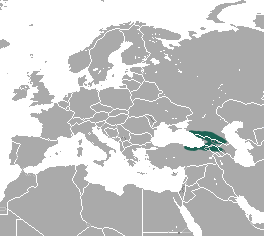
- Radde's shrew range

Species of mammal

Radde's shrew (Sorex raddei) is a species of mammal in the family Soricidae. It is found in Armenia, Azerbaijan, Georgia, Russia, and Turkey.
