= Caucasian snow vole =

Conservation status
- Least Concern (IUCN 3.1)

Scientific classification
- Kingdom: Animalia
- Phylum: Chordata
- Class: Mammalia
- Order: Rodentia
- Family: Cricetidae
- Subfamily: Arvicolinae
- Genus: Chionomys
- Species: C. gud

Binomial name
- Chionomys gud Satunin, 1909

Species of rodent

The Caucasian snow vole (Chionomys gud) is a species of rodent in the family Cricetidae.

It is found in Georgia, Russian Federation, and Turkey.

Its natural habitats are temperate forests and temperate grassland.
