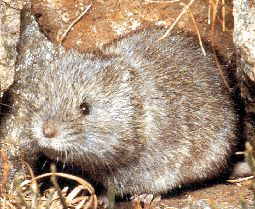
- European snow vole, (Chionomys nivalis)

Scientific classification
- Domain: Eukaryota
- Kingdom: Animalia
- Phylum: Chordata
- Class: Mammalia
- Order: Rodentia
- Family: Cricetidae
- Subfamily: Arvicolinae
- Tribe: Microtini
- Genus: Chionomys; Miller, 1908

Type species
- Arvicola nivalis Martins, 1842

Species
- Chionomys gud Chionomys nivalis Chionomys roberti

= Chionomys =

Chionomys Temporal range: Middle Pleistocene to Recent

Genus of rodents

Chionomys is a genus of rodent in the family Cricetidae.

== Taxonomy ==
Mammal Species of the World and the IUCN recognize the following 3 species:

- Caucasian snow vole (Chionomys gud)
- European snow vole (Chionomys nivalis)
- Robert's snow vole (Chionomys roberti)

The American Society of Mammalogists additionally recognizes these two species:

- Lazistan snow vole (Chionomys lasistanius) split from C. gud
- Stekolnikov's snow vole (Chionomys stekolnikovi) recently described
