= Robert's snow vole =

Conservation status
- Least Concern (IUCN 3.1)

Scientific classification
- Domain: Eukaryota
- Kingdom: Animalia
- Phylum: Chordata
- Class: Mammalia
- Order: Rodentia
- Family: Cricetidae
- Subfamily: Arvicolinae
- Genus: Chionomys
- Species: C. roberti

Binomial name
- Chionomys roberti (Thomas, 1906)

Species of rodent

Robert's snow vole (Chionomys roberti) is a species of rodent in the family Cricetidae. It is found in Azerbaijan, Georgia, the Russian Federation, and Turkey. Its natural habitats are temperate forests and temperate grassland.
