= List of mammals of Turkmenistan =

This is a list of the mammal species recorded in Turkmenistan. There are eighty-three mammal species in Turkmenistan, of which one is critically endangered, three are endangered, twelve are vulnerable, and five are near threatened.

The following tags are used to highlight each species' conservation status as assessed by the International Union for Conservation of Nature:

EX	Extinct	No reasonable doubt that the last individual has died.
EW	Extinct in the wild	Known only to survive in captivity or as a naturalized populations well outside its previous range.
CR	Critically endangered	The species is in imminent risk of extinction in the wild.
EN	Endangered	The species is facing an extremely high risk of extinction in the wild.
VU	Vulnerable	The species is facing a high risk of extinction in the wild.
NT	Near threatened	The species does not meet any of the criteria that would categorise it as risking extinction but it is likely to do so in the future.
LC	Least concern	There are no current identifiable risks to the species.
DD	Data deficient	There is inadequate information to make an assessment of the risks to this species.

== Order: Artiodactyla (even-toed ungulates) ==
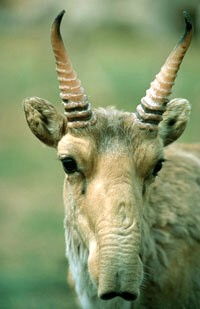
Saiga antelope

The even-toed ungulates are ungulates whose weight is borne about equally by the third and fourth toes, rather than mostly or entirely by the third as in perissodactyls. There are about 220 artiodactyl species, including many that are of great economic importance to humans.

- Family: Cervidae (deer)
  - Subfamily: Cervinae
    - Genus: Cervus
      - Central Asian red deer C. hanglu LC
        - Bactrian deer, C. h. bactrianus
- Family: Bovidae (cattle, antelope, sheep, goats)
  - Subfamily: Antilopinae
    - Genus: Gazella
      - Goitered gazelle, G. subgutturosa VU
    - Genus: Saiga
      - Saiga antelope, S. tatarica CR
  - Subfamily: Caprinae
    - Genus: Capra
      - Wild goat, C. aegagrus NT
      - Markhor, C. falconeri NT
    - Genus: Ovis
      - Urial, O. vignei VU
- Family: Suidae (pigs)
  - Subfamily: Suinae
    - Genus: Sus
      - Wild boar, S. scrofa LC

== Order: Carnivora (carnivorans) ==
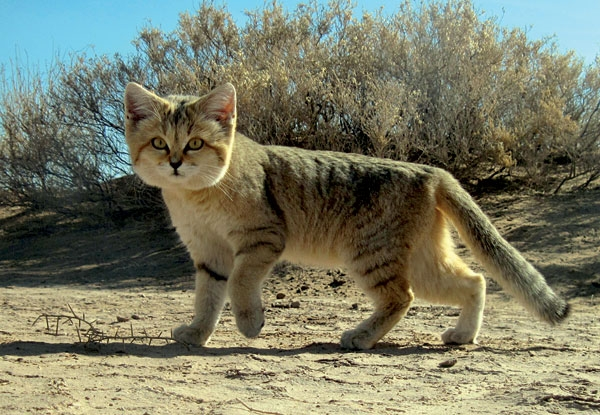
Turkestan sand cat

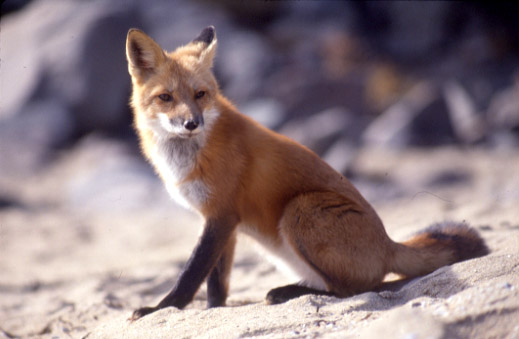
Red fox

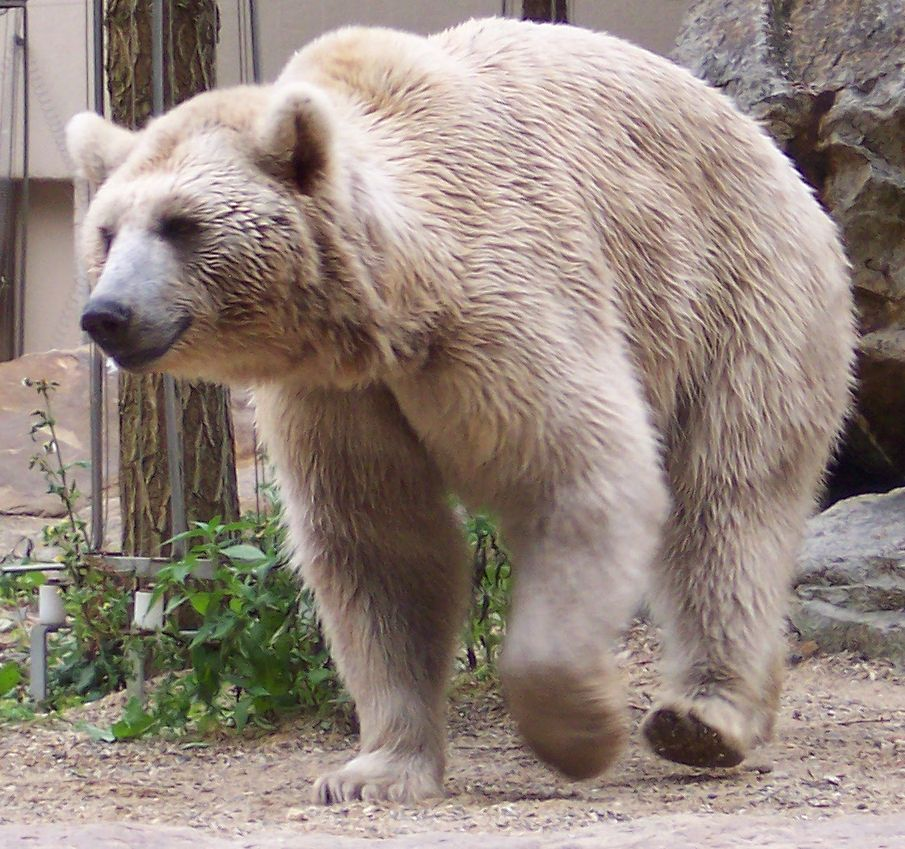
Syrian brown bear

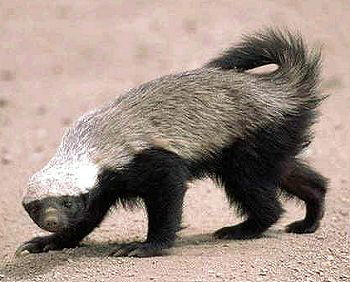
Honey badger

There are over 260 species of carnivorans, the majority of which feed primarily on meat. They have a characteristic skull shape and dentition.

- Suborder: Feliformia
  - Family: Felidae (cats)
    - Subfamily: Felinae
      - Genus: Caracal
        - Caracal, C. caracal LC
      - Genus: Felis
        - Jungle cat, F. chaus LC
        - African wildcat, F. lybica LC
          - Asiatic wildcat, F. l. ornata
        - Sand cat, F. margarita LC
          - Turkestan sand cat, F. m. thinobia
      - Genus: Lynx
        - Eurasian lynx, L. lynx LC
      - Genus: Otocolobus
        - Pallas's cat, O. manul LC
    - Subfamily: Pantherinae
      - Genus: Panthera
        - Leopard, P. pardus VU
          - Persian leopard, P. p. tulliana EN
  - Family: Hyaenidae (hyaenas)
    - Genus: Hyaena
      - Striped hyena, H. hyaena NT
- Suborder: Caniformia
  - Family: Canidae (dogs, foxes)
    - Genus: Canis
      - Golden jackal, C. aureus LC
      - Gray wolf, C. lupus LC
    - Genus: Vulpes
      - Blanford's fox, V. cana LC
      - Corsac fox, V. corsac LC
      - Red fox, V. vulpes LC
- Family: Ursidae (bears)
  - Genus: Ursus
    - Brown bear, U. arctos LC presence uncertain
      - Syrian brown bear, U. a. syriacus EN presence uncertain
- Family: Mustelidae (mustelids)
  - Genus: Lutra
    - Eurasian otter, L. lutra NT
  - Genus: Martes
    - Beech marten, M. foina LC
  - Genus: Meles
    - Caucasian badger, M. canescens NE
  - Genus: Mellivora
    - Honey badger, M. capensis LC
  - Genus: Mustela
    - Steppe polecat, M. eversmannii LC
    - Least weasel, M. nivalis LC
  - Genus: Vormela
    - Marbled polecat, V. peregusna VU
- Family: Phocidae (earless seals)
  - Genus: Pusa
    - Caspian seal, P. caspica EN

== Order: Chiroptera (bats) ==
The bats' most distinguishing feature is that their forelimbs are developed as wings, making them the only mammals capable of flight. Bat species account for about 20% of all mammals.

- Family: Vespertilionidae
  - Subfamily: Myotinae
    - Genus: Myotis
      - Lesser mouse-eared bat, M. blythii LC
      - Geoffroy's bat, M. emarginatus LC
      - Natterer's bat, M. nattereri LC
  - Subfamily: Vespertilioninae
    - Genus: Eptesicus
      - Bobrinski's serotine, E. bobrinskoi DD
      - Botta's serotine, E. bottae LC
  - Subfamily: Miniopterinae
    - Genus: Miniopterus
      - Common bent-wing bat, M. schreibersii VU
- Family: Molossidae
  - Genus: Tadarida
    - European free-tailed bat, T. teniotis LC
- Family: Rhinolophidae
  - Subfamily: Rhinolophinae
    - Genus: Rhinolophus
      - Blasius's horseshoe bat, R. blasii LC
      - Bokhara horseshoe bat, R. bocharicus LC
      - Mediterranean horseshoe bat, R. euryale NT
      - Greater horseshoe bat, R. ferrumequinum LC
      - Lesser horseshoe bat, R. hipposideros LC

== Order: Erinaceomorpha (hedgehogs and gymnures) ==
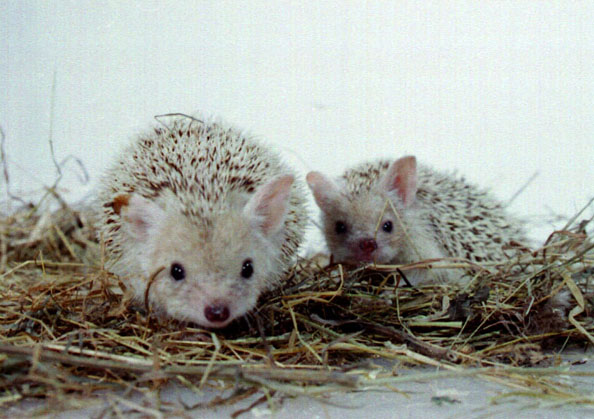
Long-eared hedgehog

The order Erinaceomorpha contains a single family, Erinaceidae, which comprise the hedgehogs and gymnures. The hedgehogs are easily recognised by their spines while gymnures look more like large rats.

- Family: Erinaceidae (hedgehogs)
  - Subfamily: Erinaceinae
    - Genus: Hemiechinus
      - Long-eared hedgehog, H. auritus LC
    - Genus: Paraechinus
      - Brandt's hedgehog, P. hypomelas LC

== Order: Lagomorpha (lagomorphs) ==
The lagomorphs comprise two families, Leporidae (hares and rabbits), and Ochotonidae (pikas). Though they can resemble rodents, and were classified as a superfamily in that order until the early 20th century, they have since been considered a separate order. They differ from rodents in a number of physical characteristics, such as having four incisors in the upper jaw rather than two.

- Family: Leporidae (hares etc.)
  - Genus: Lepus
    - Tolai hare, L. tolai LC
- Family: Ochotonidae (pikas)
  - Genus: Ochotona
    - Afghan pika, O. rufescens LC

== Order: Perissodactyla (odd-toed ungulates) ==
The odd-toed ungulates are browsing and grazing mammals. They are usually large to very large, and have relatively simple stomachs and a large middle toe.

- Family: Equidae (horses etc.)
  - Genus: Equus
    - Onager, E. hemionus NT
      - Turkmenian kulan, E. h. kulan EN

== Order: Rodentia (rodents) ==
Rodents make up the largest order of mammals, with over 40% of mammalian species. They have two incisors in the upper and lower jaw which grow continually and must be kept short by gnawing. Most rodents are small though the capybara can weigh up to 45 kg (99 lb).

- Suborder: Hystricognathi
  - Family: Hystricidae (Old World porcupines)
    - Genus: Hystrix
      - Indian crested porcupine, H. indica LC
- Suborder: Sciurognathi
    - Family: Sciuridae (squirrels)
      - Subfamily: Xerinae
        - Tribe: Xerini
          - Genus: Spermophilopsis
            - Long-clawed ground squirrel, S. leptodactylus LC
        - Tribe: Marmotini
          - Genus: Marmota
            - Menzbier's marmot, M. menzbieri VU
          - Genus: Spermophilus
            - Yellow ground squirrel, Spermophilus fulvus
    - Family: Gliridae (dormice)
      - Subfamily: Leithiinae
        - Genus: Dryomys
          - Forest dormouse, Dryomys nitedula
        - Genus: Myomimus
          - Masked mouse-tailed dormouse, Myomimus personatus VU
      - Subfamily: Glirinae
        - Genus: Glis
          - Iranian edible dormouse, Glis persicus
    - Family: Dipodidae (jerboas)
      - Subfamily: Allactaginae
        - Genus: Allactaga
          - Small five-toed jerboa, Allactaga elater
          - Great jerboa, Allactaga major
          - Severtzov's jerboa, Allactaga severtzovi
          - Mongolian five-toed jerboa, Allactaga sibirica
        - Genus: Allactodipus
          - Bobrinski's jerboa, Allactodipus bobrinskii
      - Subfamily: Dipodinae
        - Genus: Dipus
          - Northern three-toed jerboa, Dipus sagitta
        - Genus: Eremodipus
          - Lichtenstein's jerboa, Eremodipus lichtensteini
        - Genus: Jaculus
          - Turkmen jerboa, Jaculus turcmenicus
        - Genus: Paradipus
          - Comb-toed jerboa, Paradipus ctenodactylus
        - Genus: Stylodipus
          - Thick-tailed three-toed jerboa, Stylodipus telum
    - Family: Calomyscidae
      - Genus: Calomyscus
        - Great Balkhan mouse-like hamster, Calomyscus mystax
    - Family: Cricetidae
      - Subfamily: Arvicolinae
        - Genus: Blanfordimys
          - Afghan vole, Blanfordimys afghanus
        - Genus: Ellobius
          - Southern mole vole, Ellobius fuscocapillus
          - Northern mole vole, Ellobius talpinus
          - Zaisan mole vole, Ellobius tancrei
        - Genus: Microtus
          - Persian vole, Microtus irani
          - Tien Shan vole, Microtus kirgisorum
          - Transcaspian vole, Microtus transcaspicus
    - Family: Muridae (mice, rats, voles, gerbils, hamsters)
      - Subfamily: Gerbillinae
        - Genus: Meriones
          - Libyan jird, Meriones libycus LC
          - Midday jird, Meriones meridianus
          - Persian jird, Meriones persicus
          - Tamarisk jird, Meriones tamariscinus
          - Zarudny's jird, Meriones zarudnyi EN
        - Genus: Rhombomys
          - Great gerbil, Rhombomys opimus LC
      - Subfamily: Murinae
        - Genus: Nesokia
          - Short-tailed bandicoot rat, Nesokia indica LC

== Order: Soricomorpha (shrews, moles, and solenodons) ==
The "shrew-forms" are insectivorous mammals. The shrews and solenodons closely resemble mice while the moles are stout-bodied burrowers.

- Family: Soricidae (shrews)
  - Subfamily: Crocidurinae
    - Genus: Crocidura
      - Lesser white-toothed shrew, C. suaveolens LC
    - Genus: Diplomesodon
      - Piebald shrew, D. pulchellum LC
  - Subfamily: Soricinae
    - Tribe: Soricini
      - Genus: Sorex
        - Eurasian pygmy shrew, S. minutus LC

== Locally extinct ==
The following species are locally extinct in the country:

- Cheetah, Acinonyx jubatus
- Tiger, Panthera tigris

== See also ==
- List of chordate orders
- Lists of mammals by region
- Mammal classification
