= List of mammals of Azerbaijan =

This list shows the IUCN Red List status of mammal species occurring in Azerbaijan.

Icons which state each species' global IUCN status:
EX	Extinct	No reasonable doubt that the last individual has died
EN	Endangered	Facing an extremely high risk of extinction in the wild
VU	Vulnerable	Facing a high risk of extinction in the wild
NT	Near Threatened	Doesn't meet any criteria that would categorise it as risking extinction but likely to in the future
LC	Least Concern	No current identifiable risks to this species
DD	Data Deficient	Inadequate information to make an assessment of the risks to this species

== Order: Artiodactyla ==
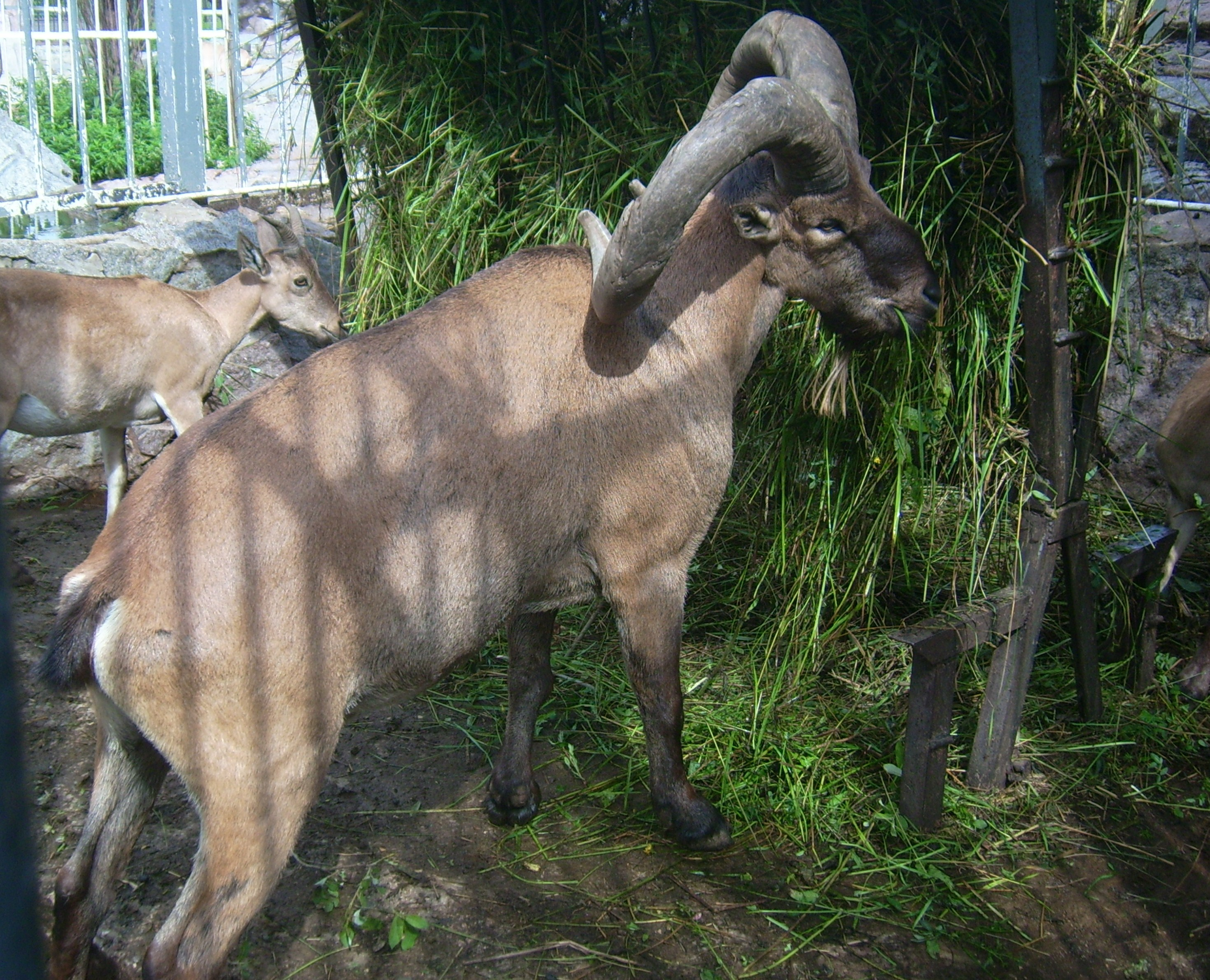
East Caucasian tur

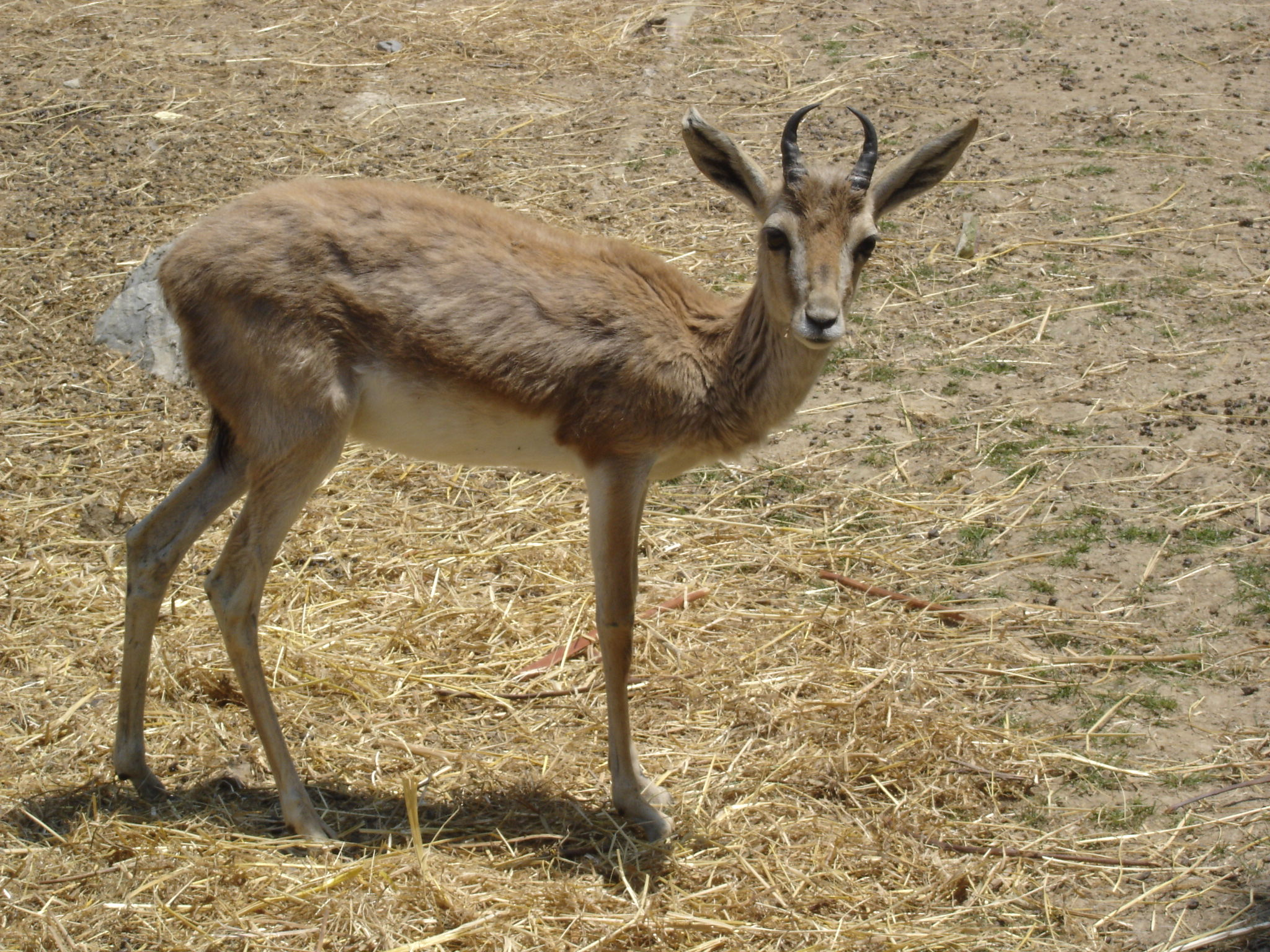
Goitered gazelle

- Family: Bovidae
  - Genus: Bison
    - European bison, B. bonasus NT reintroduced
      - Caucasian wisent, B. b. caucasicus EX
  - Genus: Capra
    - Wild goat, C. aegagrus NT
    - East Caucasian tur, C. cylindricornis NT
  - Genus: Gazella
    - Goitered gazelle, G. subgutturosa VU
  - Genus: Ovis
    - Mouflon, O. gmelini NT
      - Armenian mouflon, O. g. gmelini
  - Genus: Rupicapra
    - Chamois, R. rupicapra LC
- Family: Cervidae
  - Genus: Capreolus
    - Roe deer, C. capreolus LC
  - Genus: Cervus
    - Red deer, C. elaphus LC
    - Sika deer, C. nippon LC introduced
- Family: Suidae
  - Genus: Sus
    - Wild boar, S. scrofa LC

== Order: Carnivora ==
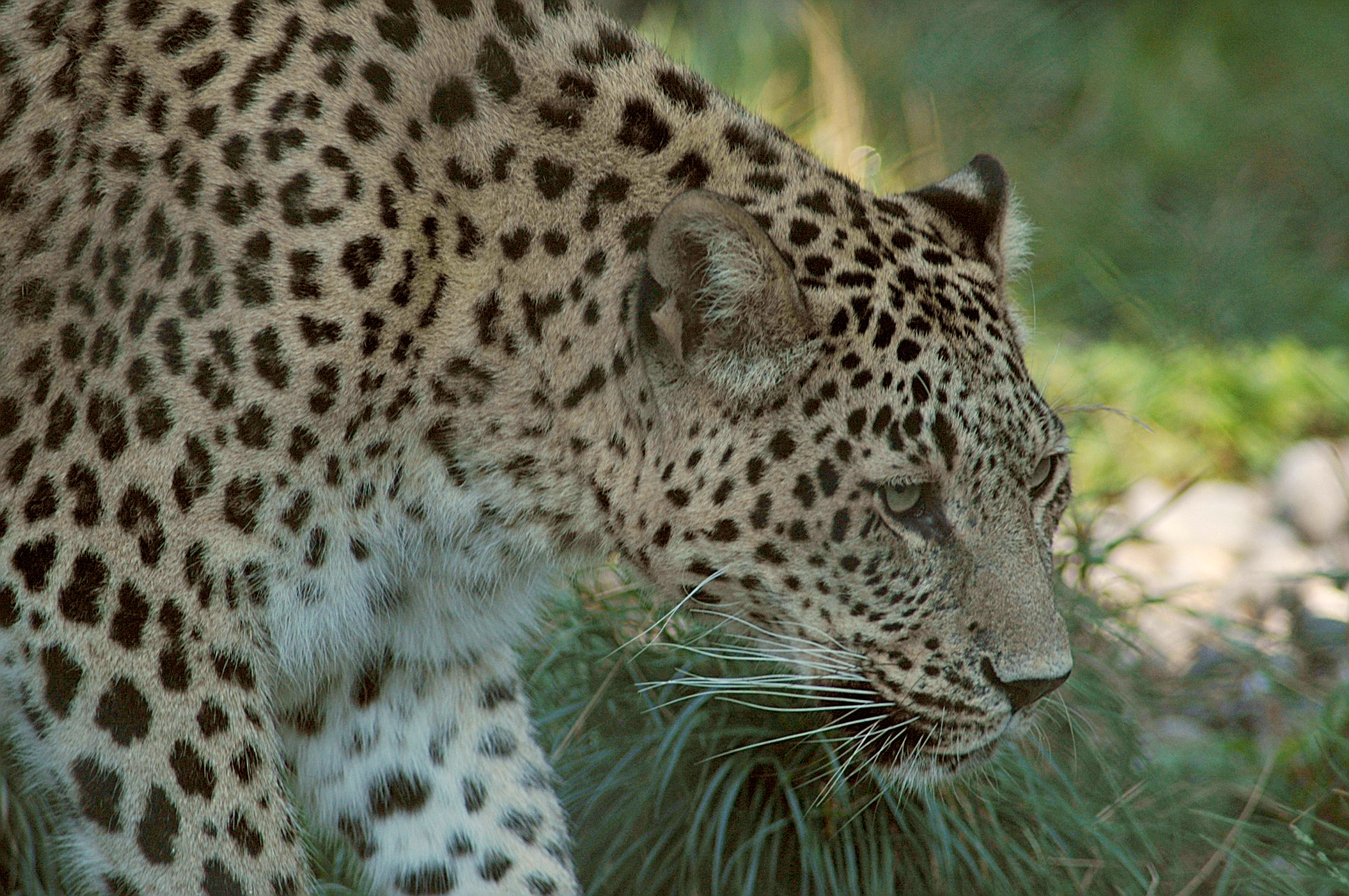
Leopard

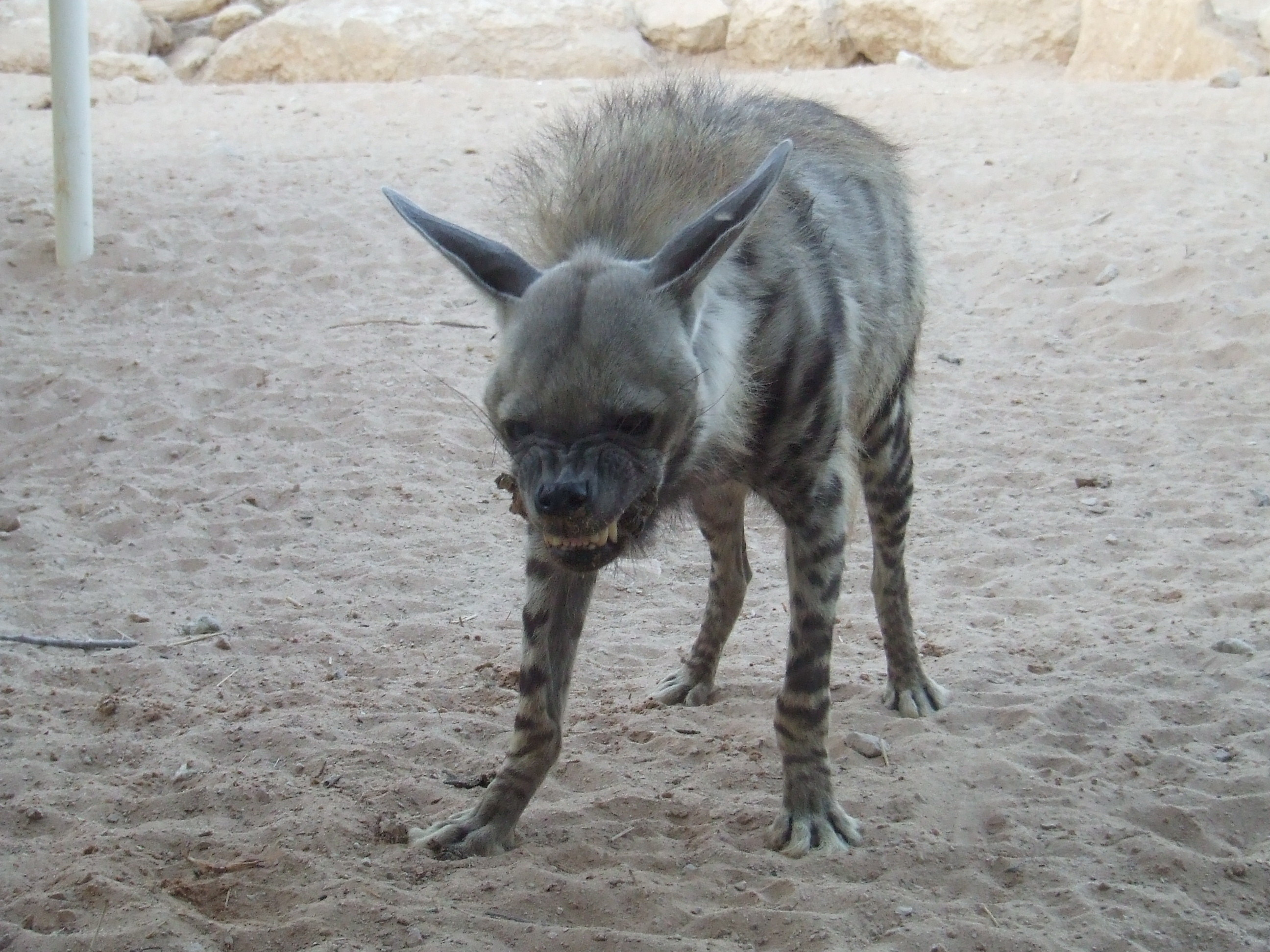
Striped hyena

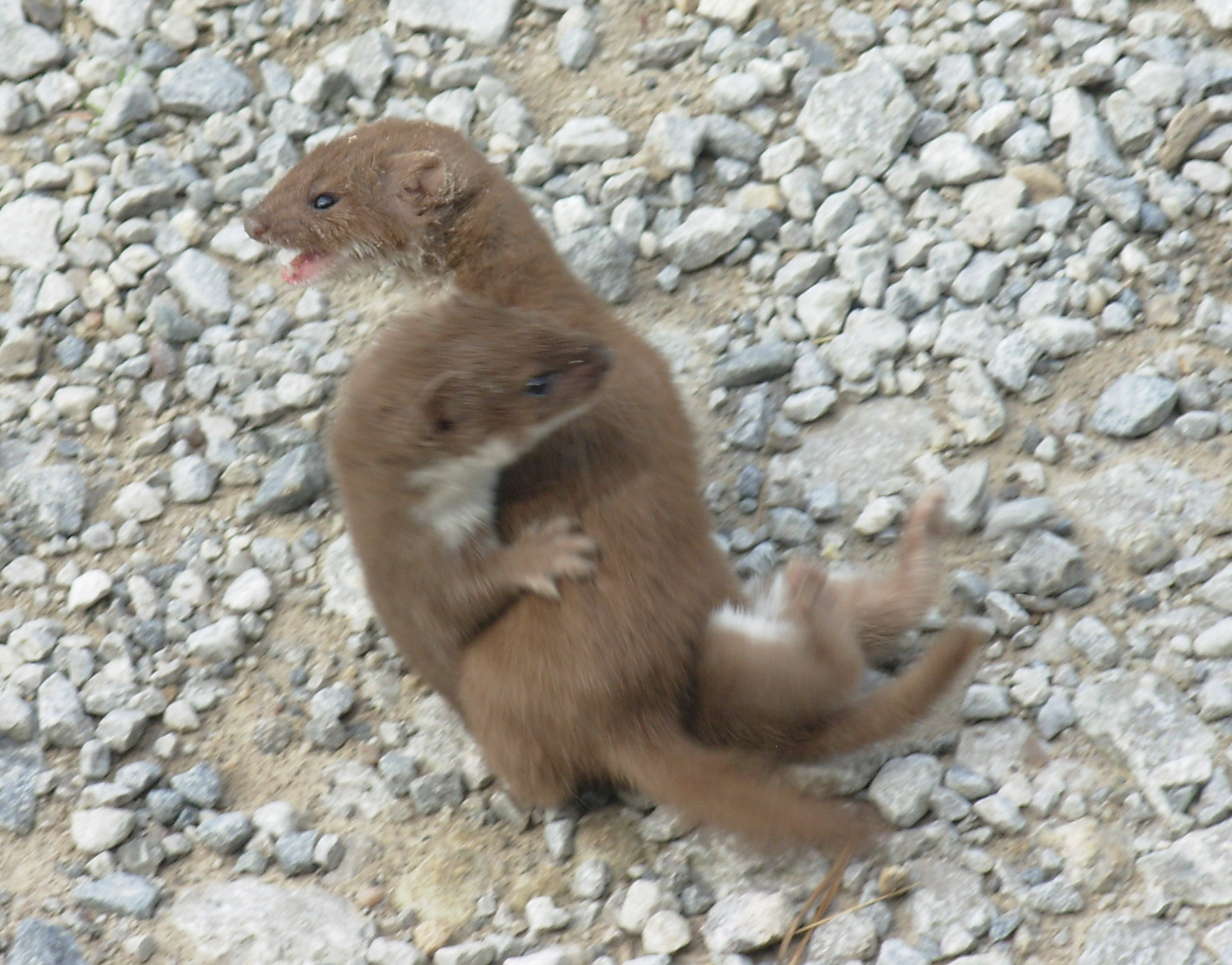
Least weasel

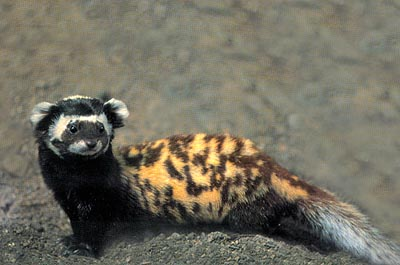
Marbled polecat

- Family: Canidae
  - Genus: Canis
    - Golden jackal, C. aureus LC
      - European jackal, C. a. moreoticus
    - Gray wolf, C. lupus LC
      - Steppe wolf, C. l. campestris
  - Genus: Vulpes
    - Red fox, V. vulpes LC
- Family: Felidae
  - Genus: Felis
    - Jungle cat, F. chaus LC
    - European wildcat, F. silvestris LC
      - African wildcat, F. lybica LC
  - Genus: Otocolobus
    - Pallas's cat, O. manul LC
  - Genus: Lynx
    - Eurasian lynx, L. lynx LC
      - Caucasian lynx, L. l. dinniki
  - Genus: Panthera
    - Leopard, P. pardus VU
      - Persian leopard, P. p. tulliana EN
- Family: Ursidae
  - Genus: Ursus
    - Brown bear, U. arctos LC
- Family: Procyonidae
  - Genus: Procyon
    - Common raccoon, P. lotor LC introduced
- Family: Hyaenidae
  - Genus: Hyaena
    - Striped hyena, H. hyaena NT
- Family: Mustelidae
  - Genus: Lutra
    - European otter, L. lutra NT
  - Genus: Martes
    - Beech marten, M. foina LC
    - European pine marten, M. martes LC
  - Genus: Meles
    - Caucasian badger, M. canescens NE
  - Genus: Mustela
    - Stoat, M. erminea LC
    - Least weasel, M. nivalis LC
  - Genus: Vormela
    - Marbled polecat, V. peregusna VU
- Family: Phocidae
  - Genus: Pusa
    - Caspian seal, P. caspica EN

== Order: Chiroptera ==
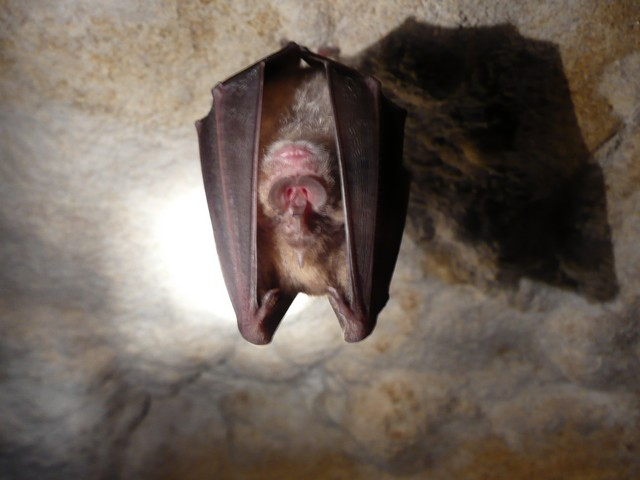
Greater horseshoe bat

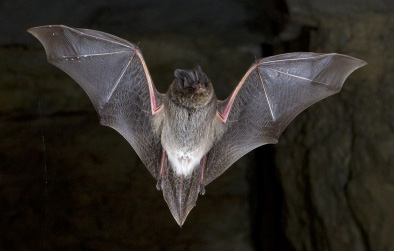
Western barbastelle

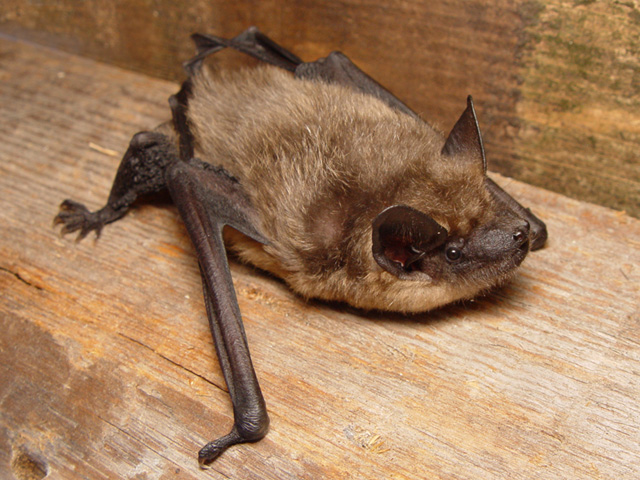
Serotine bat

- Family: Vespertilionidae
  - Genus: Barbastella
    - Western barbastelle, B. barbastellus NT
    - Asian barbastelle, B. leucomelas LC
  - Genus: Eptesicus
    - Botta's serotine, E. bottae LC
    - Northern bat, E. nilssonii LC
    - Serotine bat, E. serotinus LC
  - Genus: Hypsugo
    - Savi's pipistrelle, H. savii LC
  - Genus: Miniopterus
    - Common bent-wing bat, M. schreibersii VU
  - Genus: Myotis
    - Bechstein's bat, M. bechsteini NT
    - Lesser mouse-eared bat, M. blythii LC
    - Geoffroy's bat, M. emarginatus LC
    - Whiskered bat, M. mystacinus LC
    - Natterer's bat, M. nattereri LC
  - Genus: Nyctalus
    - Lesser noctule, N. leisleri LC
    - Common noctule, N. noctula LC
  - Genus: Plecotus
    - Brown long-eared bat, P. auritus LC
    - Grey long-eared bat, P. austriacus NT
  - Genus: Pipistrellus
    - Kuhl's pipistrelle, P. kuhlii LC
    - Nathusius' pipistrelle, P. nathusii LC
    - Common pipistrelle, P. pipistrellus LC
    - Soprano pipistrelle, P. pygmaeus LC
  - Genus: Vespertilio
    - Parti-coloured bat, V. murinus LC
- Family: Molossidae
  - Genus: Tadarida
    - European free-tailed bat, T. teniotis LC
- Family: Rhinolophidae
  - Genus: Rhinolophus
    - Blasius's horseshoe bat, R. blasii LC
    - Mediterranean horseshoe bat, R. euryale NT
    - Greater horseshoe bat, R. ferrumequinum LC
    - Lesser horseshoe bat, R. hipposideros LC
    - Mehely's horseshoe bat, R. mehelyi VU

== Order: Eulipotyphla ==
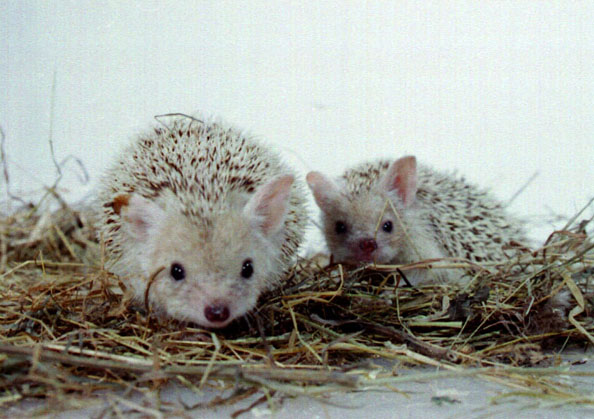
Long-eared hedgehog

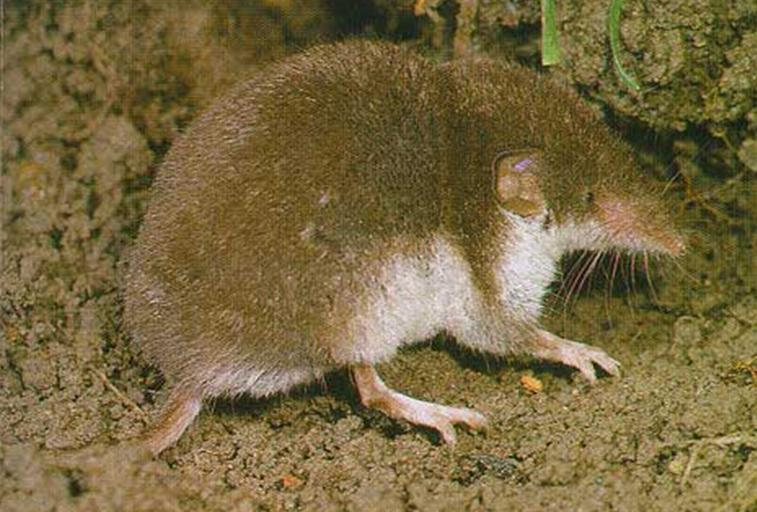
Bicolored shrew

- Family: Erinaceidae
  - Genus: Erinaceus
    - Southern white-breasted hedgehog, E. concolor LC
  - Genus: Hemiechinus
    - Long-eared hedgehog, H. auritus LC
- Family: Soricidae
  - Genus: Crocidura
    - Caspian shrew, C. caspica DD
    - Gueldenstaedt's shrew, C. gueldenstaedti LC
    - Bicolored shrew, C. leucodon LC
  - Genus: Neomys
    - Transcaucasian water shrew, N. teres LC
  - Genus: Suncus
    - Etruscan shrew, S. etruscus LC
- Family: Talpidae
  - Genus: Talpa
    - Levant mole, T. levantis LC

== Order: Lagomorpha ==
- Family: Leporidae
  - Genus: Lepus
    - European hare, L. europaeus LC
  - Genus: Oryctolagus
    - European rabbit, O. cuniculus NT

== Order: Rodentia ==
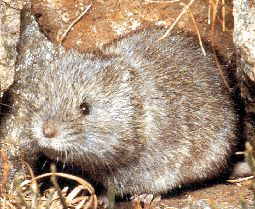
European snow vole

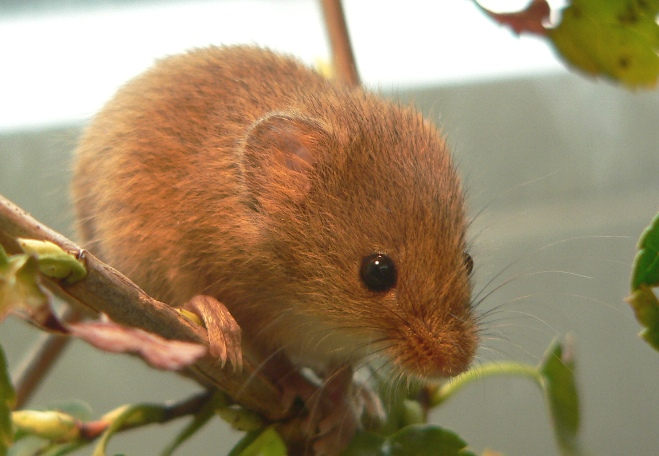
Harvest mouse

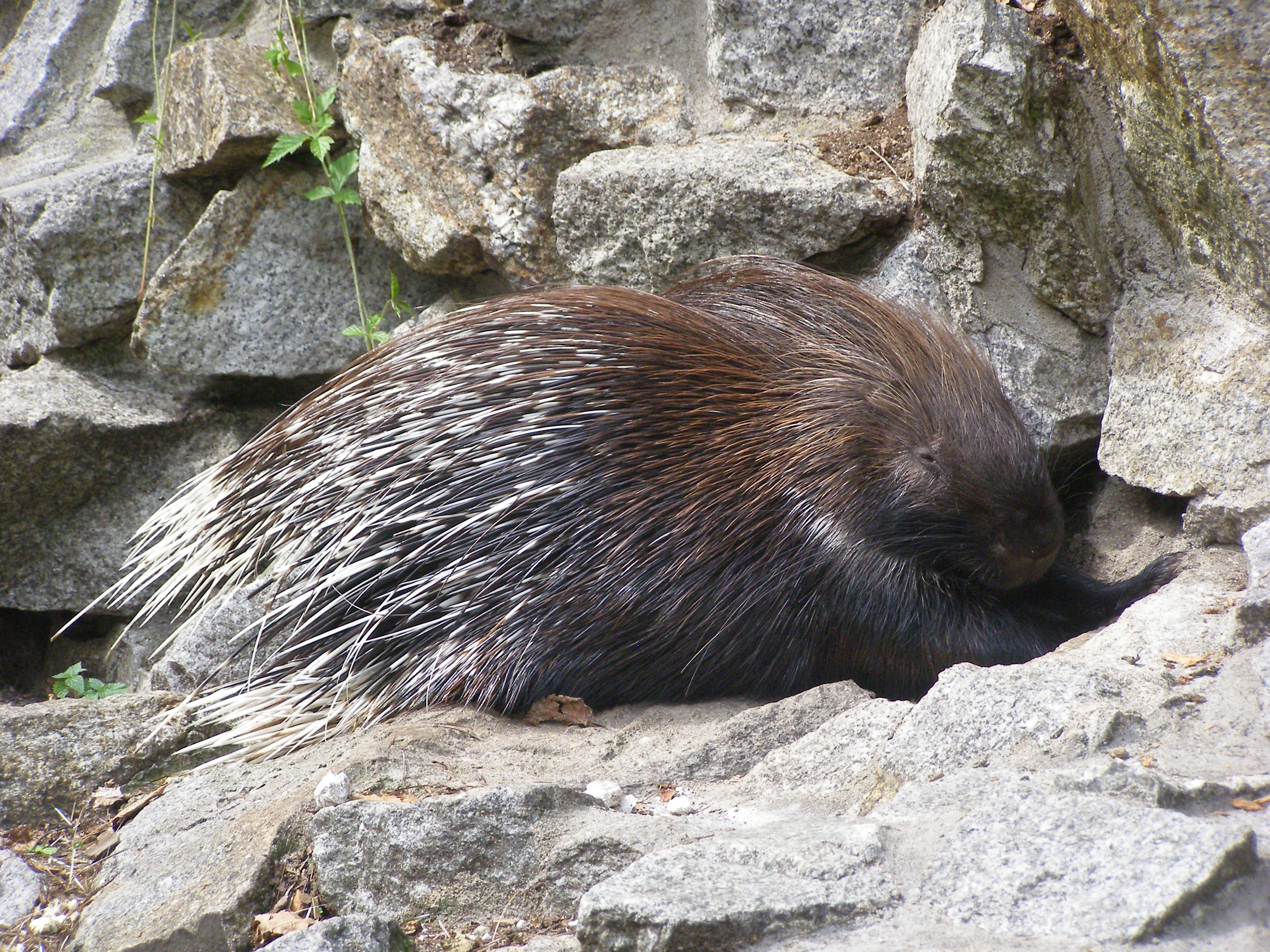
Indian porcupine

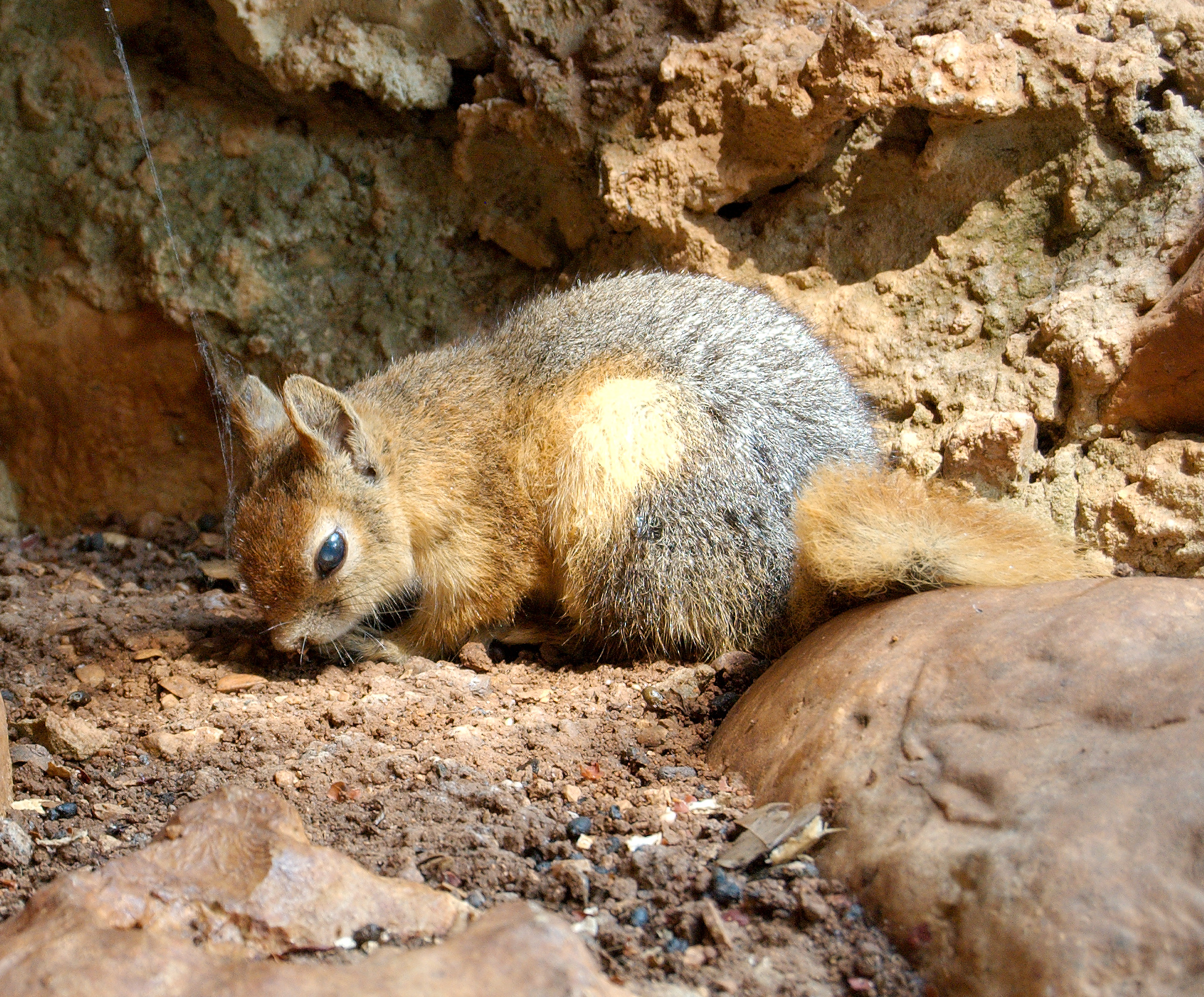
Caucasian squirrel

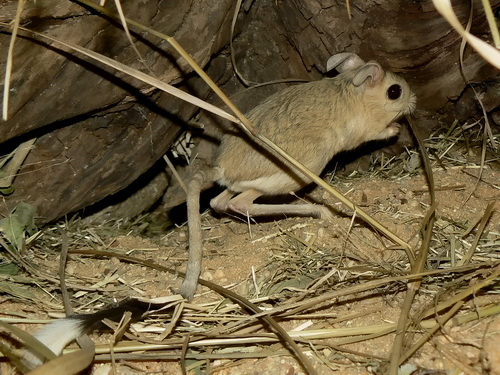
Small five-toed jerboa

- Family: Calomyscidae
  - Genus: Calomyscus
    - Urar mouse-like hamster, C. urartensis LC
- Family: Cricetidae
  - Genus: Arvicolinae
    - European water vole, A. amphibius LC
  - Genus: Chionomys
    - Caucasian snow vole, C. gud LC
    - European snow vole, C. nivalis LC
    - Robert's snow vole, C. roberti LC
  - Genus: Cricetulus
    - Grey hamster, C. migratorius LC
  - Genus: Ellobius
    - Transcaucasian mole vole, E. lutescens LC
  - Genus: Mesocricetus
    - Turkish hamster, M. brandti NT
  - Genus: Microtus
    - Common vole, M. arvalis LC
    - Daghestan pine vole, M. daghestanicus LC
    - Major's pine vole, M. majori LC
    - Schelkovnikov's pine vole, M. schelkovnikovi LC
    - Social vole, M. socialis LC
- Family: Dipodidae
  - Genus: Allactaga
    - Small five-toed jerboa, A. elater LC
    - Williams' jerboa, A. williamsi LC
- Family: Gliridae
  - Genus: Dryomys
    - Forest dormouse, D. nitedula LC
  - Genus: Glis
    - European edible dormouse, G. glis LC
    - Iranian edible dormouse, G. persicus NE
- Family: Hystricidae
  - Genus: Hystrix
    - Indian crested porcupine, H. indica LC
- Family: Muridae
  - Genus: Apodemus
    - Striped field mouse, A. agrarius LC
    - Caucasus field mouse, A. hyrcanicus NT
    - Black Sea field mouse, A. ponticus LC
    - Ural field mouse, A. uralensis LC
    - Steppe field mouse, A. witherbyi LC
  - Genus: Meriones
    - Libyan jird, M. libycus LC
    - Midday jird, M. meridianus LC
    - Persian jird, M. persicus LC
    - Tristram's jird, M. tristami LC
    - Vinogradov's jird, M. vinogradovi LC
  - Genus: Micromys
    - Eurasian harvest mouse, M. minutus LC
  - Genus: Mus
    - House mouse, M. musculus LC
  - Genus: Rattus
    - Brown rat, R. norvegicus LC introduced
    - Black rat, R. rattus LC
- Family: Myocastoridae
  - Genus: Myocastor
    - Coypu, M. coypus LC introduced
- Family: Sciuridae
  - Genus: Sciurus
    - Caucasian squirrel, S. anomalus LC
    - Red squirrel, S. vulgaris LC

== Locally extinct ==
The following species are locally extinct in the country:

- Cheetah, Acinonyx jubatus
- Moose, Alces alces
- Wild horse, Equus ferus
- Onager, Equus hemionus
- Lion, Panthera leo
- Tiger, Panthera tigris

== See also ==
- List of chordate orders
- Lists of mammals by region
- Mammal classification
