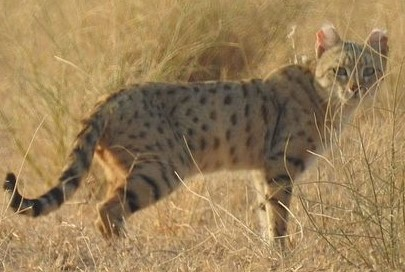

Scientific classification
- Kingdom: Animalia
- Phylum: Chordata
- Class: Mammalia
- Infraclass: Placentalia
- Order: Carnivora
- Family: Felidae
- Genus: Felis
- Species: F. lybica
- Subspecies: F. l. ornata

Trinomial name
- Felis lybica ornata Gray, 1830–1832
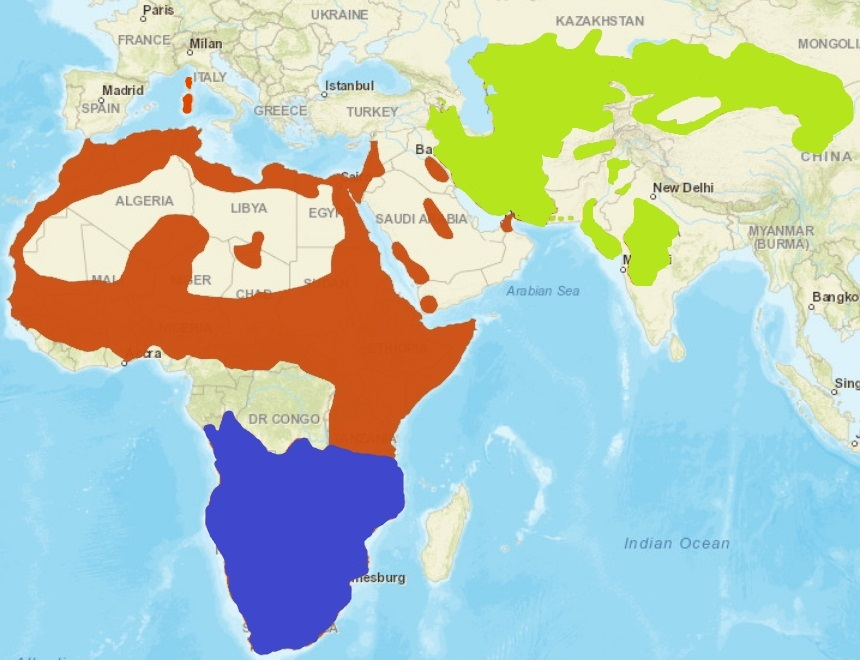
- Range of the Asiatic wildcat

= Asiatic wildcat =

Small wild cat

The Asiatic wildcat (Felis lybica ornata), also known as the Indian desert cat, is an African wildcat subspecies that occurs from the eastern Caspian Sea north to Kazakhstan, into western India, western China and southern Mongolia. There is no information on current status or population numbers across the Asiatic wildcat's range as a whole, but populations are thought to be declining.

== Taxonomy ==
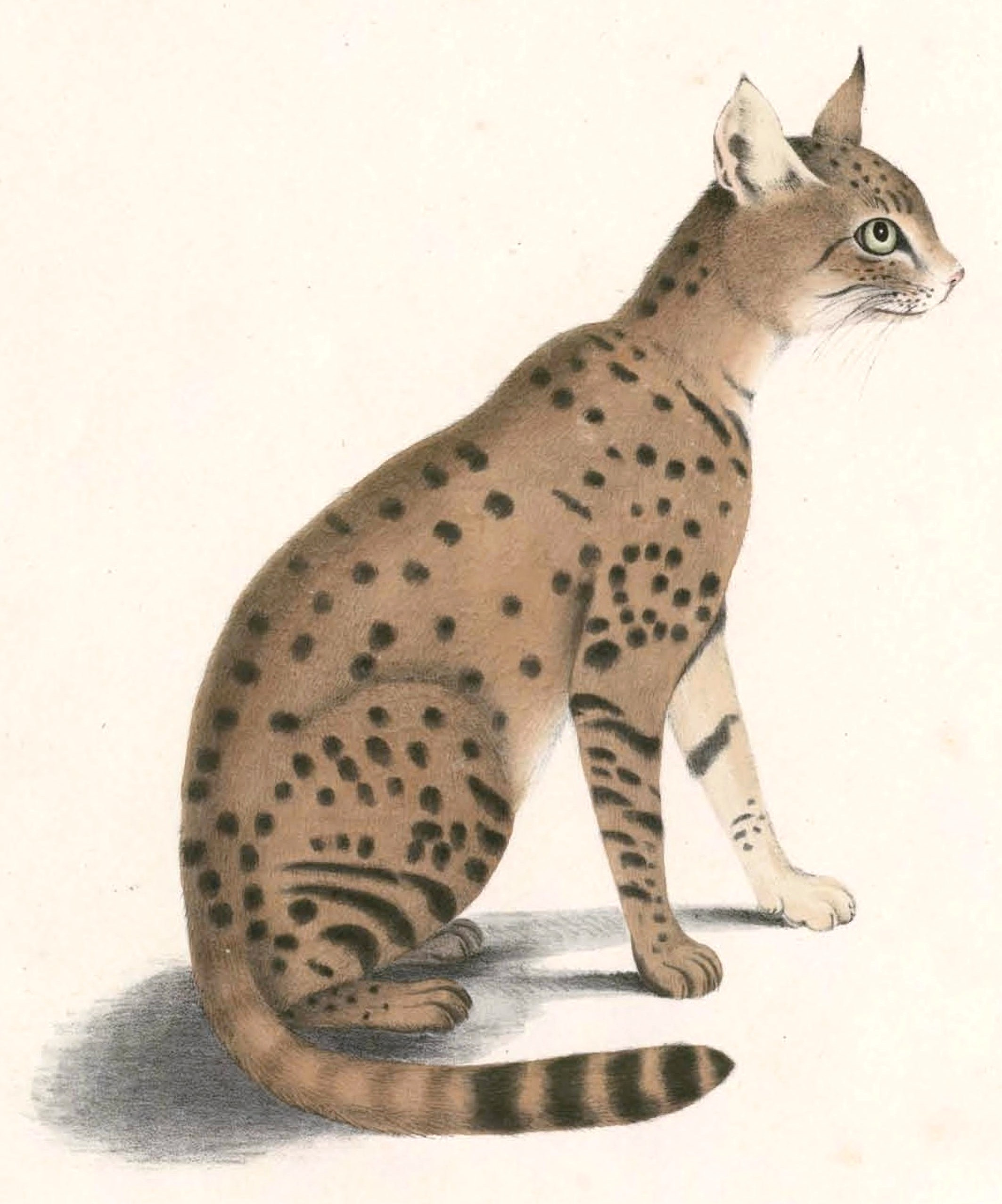
Illustration of an Indian desert wildcat from Thomas Hardwicke's collection

Felis ornata was the scientific name used by John Edward Gray in the early 1830s as a caption to an illustration of an Indian wildcat from Thomas Hardwicke's collection. In subsequent years, several naturalists described spotted wildcat zoological specimens from Asian range countries and proposed names, including the following:

- Chaus caudatus by Gray in 1874 was a skin and skull from the Bukhara Region in Uzbekistan.
- Felis shawiana by William Thomas Blanford in 1876 was a pale wildcat skin from Yarkand in Xinjiang, western China.
- Felis (Felis) kozlovi by Konstantin Satunin in 1904 was a wildcat skin from an oasis in the Turpan Depression in western China.
- Felis (Felis) murgabensis and Felis (Felis) matschiei by Ludwig Zukowsky in 1914 were wildcat skins and skulls from the Murghab River in Afghanistan and Geok Tepe in Turkmenistan, respectively.
- Felis ornata nesterovi by Alexei Birulya in 1916 was a female wildcat skin from Lower Mesopotamia.
- Felis ornata issikulensis by Sergey Ognev in 1930 was a skin and skull of a male wildcat from the southwestern shore of Lake Issyk-Kul in Kyrgyzstan.

In the 1940s, Reginald Innes Pocock reviewed the collection of wildcat skins and skulls in the Natural History Museum, London and subordinated all the spotted wildcat specimens to Felis lybica, arguing that size of skulls and teeth do not differ from those from African range countries.

== Characteristics ==
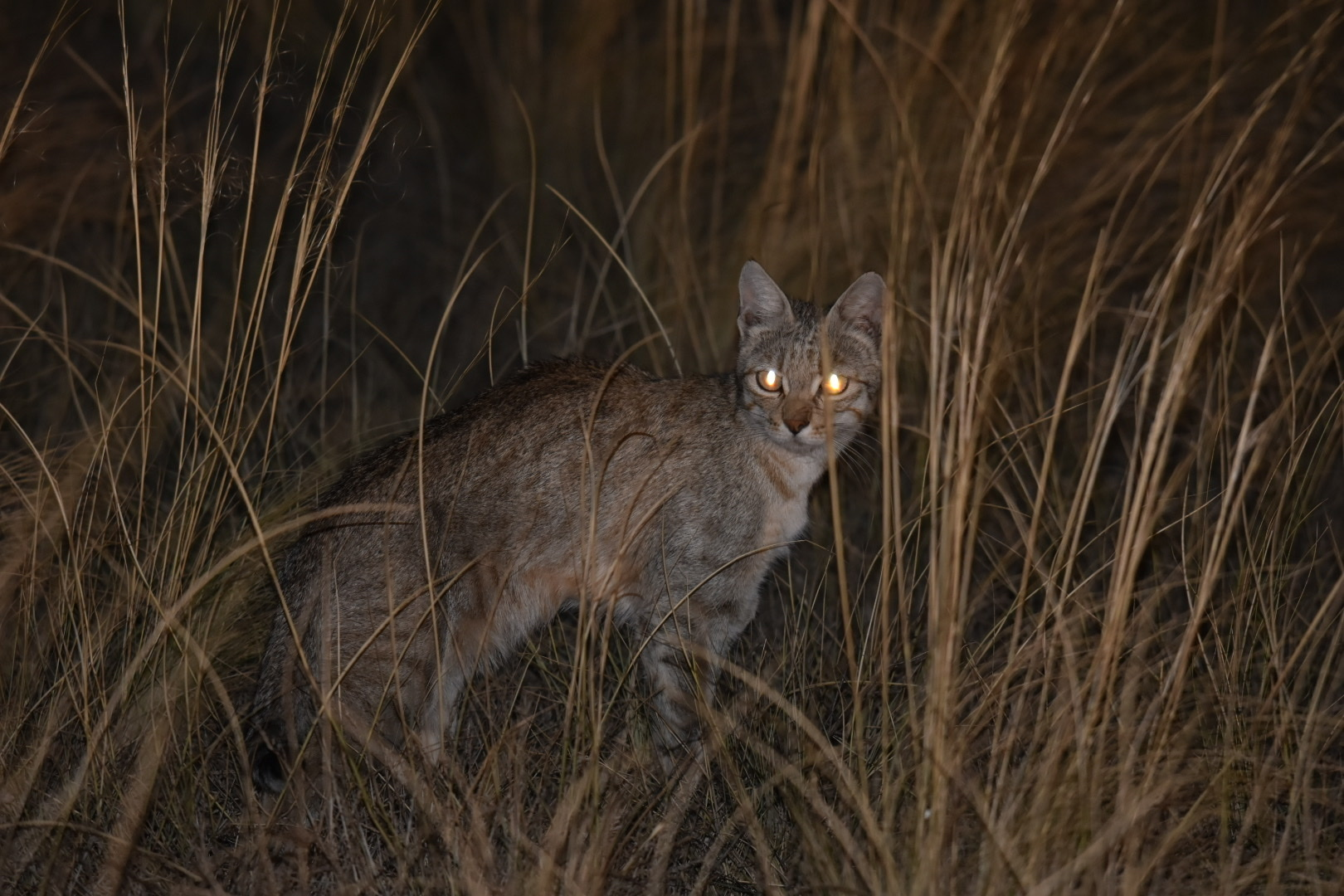
Asiatic wildcat

The Asiatic wildcat's fur is light sandy coloured with small rounded spots on its upper body. These spots are solid and sharply defined, and do not occur in clusters. The spots on the chest and abdomen are much larger and more blurred than on the back, and usually do not form transverse rows or stripes on the trunk. Its colours and patterns vary greatly. The hairs along the spine are usually darker, forming a dark gray, brownish or ochreous band. The upper lips and eyelids are light, pale yellow-white. The facial region is of an intense gray colour, while the top of the head is covered with a dark gray coat. In some individuals, the forehead is covered in dense clusters of brown spots. A narrow, dark brown stripe extends from the corner of the eye to the base of the ear. The lower neck, throat, neck, and the region between the forelegs are devoid of spots, or only with indistinct spots. The thighs are distinctly striped. The underside is whitish, with a light gray, creamy or pale yellow tinge. The tail is mostly the same colour as the back, with the addition of a dark and narrow stripe along the upper two-thirds of the tail; it appears thin, as the hairs are short and close-fitting. The tip of the tail is black, with two to five black transverse rings above it.

The Asian wildcat has a long, tapering tail, always with a short black tip, and with spots at the base. The forehead has a pattern of four well-developed black bands. A small but pronounced tuft of hair up to one cm long grows from the tip of each ear. Paler forms of Asian wildcat live in drier areas and the darker, more heavily spotted and striped forms occur in more humid and wooded areas. The throat and ventral surfaces are whitish to light grey to cream, often with distinct white patches on the throat, chest and belly. Throughout its range the Asian wildcat's coat is usually short, but the length of the fur can vary depending on the age of the animal and the season of the year. Compared to the domestic cat, Asian wildcats have relatively longer legs. Males are generally heavier than females.

In Pakistan and India, wildcats have pale sandy yellow coats, marked with small spots that tend to lie in vertical lines down the trunk and flanks. The wildcats of Central Asia have a more greyish-yellow or reddish background color, marked distinctly with small black or red-brown spots. The spots are sometimes fused into stripes, especially in the Central Asian regions east of the Tian Shan Mountains.

The Asiatic wildcat weighs about 3–4 kg (6.6–8.8 lb).

== Distribution and habitat ==
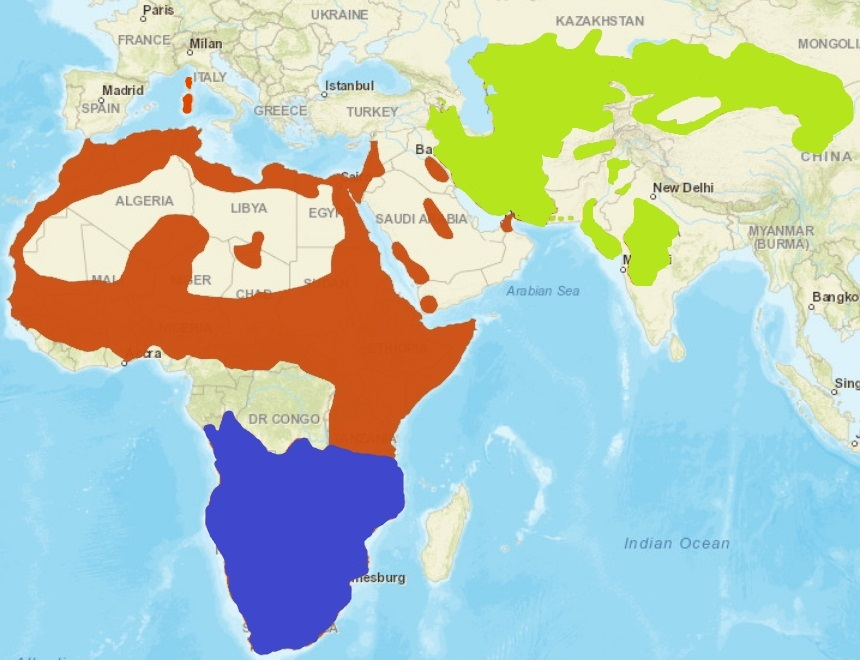
Distribution of Asiatic Wildcat in light green

The Caucasus is the transitional zone between the European wildcat to the north and west, and the Asiatic wildcat to the south and east. In this region, the European wildcat is present in montane forest, and the Asiatic wildcat is present in the low-lying desert and semi-desert areas adjoining the Caspian Sea. It usually occurs in close proximity to water sources, but is also able to live year-round in waterless desert. It ranges up to 2,000 to 3,000 m (6,600 to 9,800 ft) in mountain areas with sufficient dense vegetation. Snow depth limits the northern boundaries of its range in winter.

In Iran, the Asiatic wildcat has been recorded in arid plains, lush forests, coastal areas and mountains, but not in extremely high elevations and deserts.

In Afghanistan, the Asiatic wildcat has been recorded prior to 1973 in the central Hazarajat mountains and the steppe region, near Shibar Pass and Herat, and in Bamyan Province.

In India, the Asiatic wildcat inhabits the Thar Desert and is associated with scrub desert. In 1999, it was still reported as common in the Rajasthani districts of Bikaner, Barmer, Jaisalmer, Pali and Nagaur. Only four sightings were reported in the Thar Desert between 1999 and 2006. It has been recorded in Nauradehi Wildlife Sanctuary, in Madhya Pradesh and Mirzapur forests.

In Pakistan, it was known from arid regions in the Sindh Province.

In the 1990s, wildcats were reported common and populations stable in the lowlands of Kazakhstan. A pronounced loss of range has been documented in Azerbaijan.

Within China, the Asian wildcat is distributed in Xinjiang, Qinghai, Gansu, Ningxia, Shaanxi, and Inner Mongolia. Records from northern Tibet as well as Sichuan are questionable. Prior to 1950, it was the most abundant cat in Xinjiang occurring along all major river basin systems and Taklamakan Desert but later it got confined to three regions of southern Xinjiang only like the Bayingolin Mongol Autonomous Prefecture, Aksu and Hotan Prefectures. It was thought to decline rapidly in the Xinjiang desert region of China mainly because of excessive hunting for the pelt trade followed by shrinkage of its habitat due to cultivation, oil and gas exploration and excessive use of pesticides.

== Ecology and behaviour ==
Asiatic wildcats are frequently observed in the daytime. They use rock crevices or burrows dug by other animals.

=== Hunting and diet ===
In Turkmenistan, the Asiatic wildcat feed on great gerbils, Libyan jirds, Afghan voles, long-clawed ground squirrels, tolai hares, small birds like larks, lizards, beetles, and grasshoppers. Near Repetek Biosphere State Reserve, the wildcat is responsible for destroying over 50% of nests made by desert finches, streaked scrub warblers, red-tailed warblers, and turtledoves. In the Qarshi steppes of Uzbekistan, the wildcat's prey, in descending order of preference, includes great gerbils, Libyan jirds, jerboas, other rodents and passerine birds, reptiles, and insects. Wildcats in eastern Kyzyl Kum have similar prey preferences, with the addition of tolai hares, Midday jirds, small five-toed jerboas, and steppe agamas. In Kyrgyzstan, the wildcat's primary prey varies from Tolai hares near Issyk Kul, pheasants in the Chu and Talas River valleys, and mouse-like rodents and gray partridges in the foothills. In Kazakhstan's lower Ili River, the wildcat mainly targets rodents, muskrats, and Tamarisk jird. Occasionally, remains of young roe deer and wild boar are present in its faeces. After rodents, birds follow in importance, along with reptiles, fish, insects, eggs, grass stalks and nuts.

In the scrub habitat of western Rajasthan, they live largely on desert gerbils, but also hunt hares, rats, doves, gray partridges, sandgrouses, peafowl, bulbuls, Old World sparrows and eat eggs of ground birds. They have also been observed killing cobras, saw-scaled vipers, sand boas, geckos, scorpions and beetles.

Results of a feed item analysis of Asiatic wildcats in the Tarim Basin revealed that their primary prey was the Yarkand hare followed by Midday jird, long-eared jerboa, poultry and small bird, fish, five-toed pygmy jerboa, Agamid lizards and sand lizard.

=== Parasites and infestations ===
The wildcat is highly parasitised by helminths. Some wildcats in Georgia carry the helminth species Hydatigera taeniaeformis, Diphyllobothrium mansoni, Toxocara mystax, Capillaria feliscati and Ancylostoma caninum. Wildcats in Azerbaijan carry Hydatigera krepkogorski and Toxocara mystax. In Transcaucasia, the majority of wildcats are infested by the tick Ixodes ricinus. In some summers, wildcats are infested with fleas of the genus Ceratophyllus, which they likely contract from brown rats.

== Threats ==
Female Asiatic wildcats mate quite often with domestic males, and hybrid offspring are frequently found near villages where wild females live. They have been hunted at large in Afghanistan; in 1977 over 1,200 pelts manufactured into different articles were on display in Kabul bazaars.

== Conservation ==
The Asiatic wildcat is included on CITES Appendix II. It is protected in Turkmenistan, Kyrgyzstan, Tajikistan, Mongolia, China and Russia. In Afghanistan, it has been placed on the country's first Protected Species List in 2009, banning all hunting and trading within the country, and is proposed as a priority species for future study.
