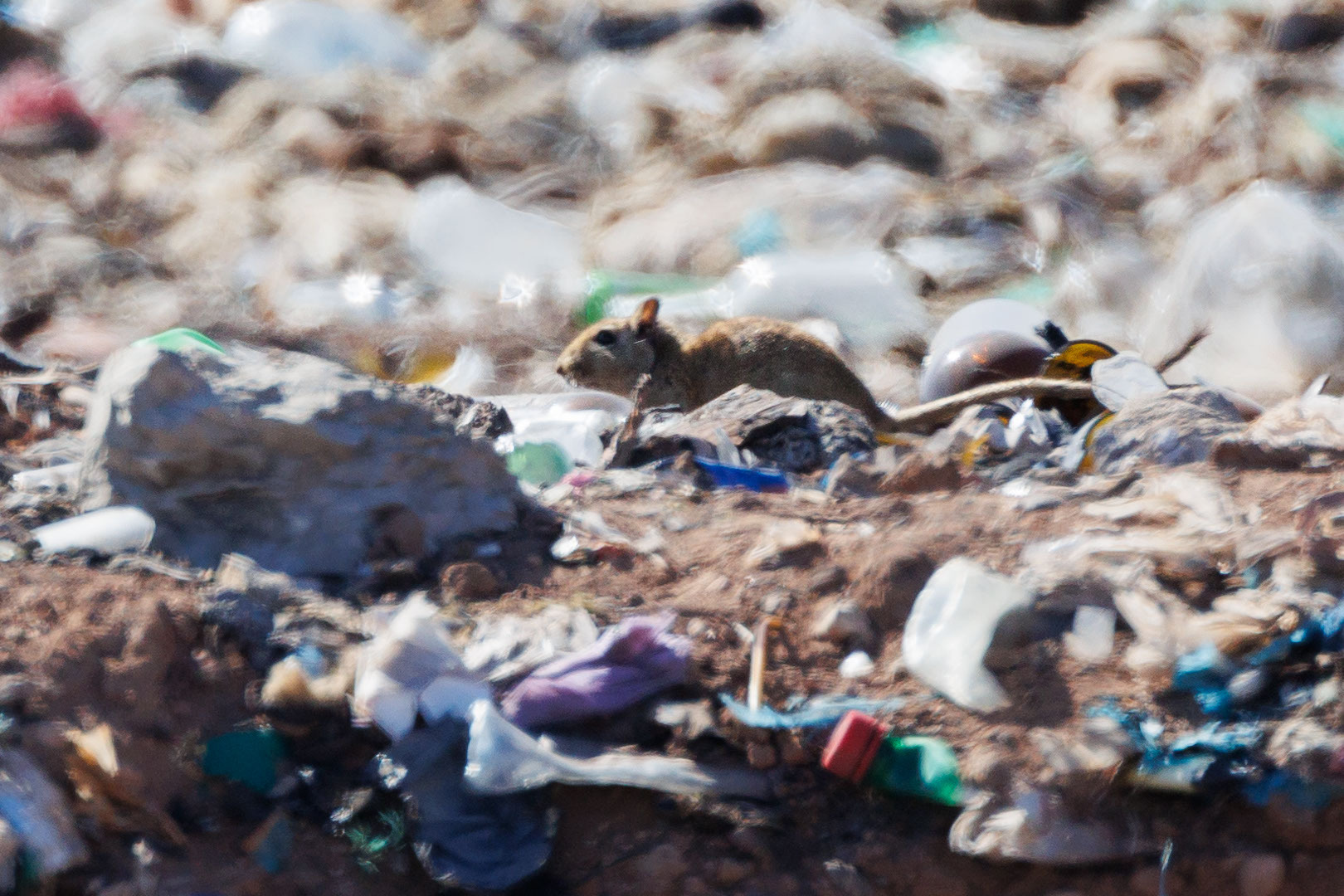
- Boumalne Dades, Morocco

Conservation status
- Least Concern (IUCN 3.1)

Scientific classification
- Kingdom: Animalia
- Phylum: Chordata
- Class: Mammalia
- Order: Rodentia
- Family: Muridae
- Genus: Meriones
- Species: M. grandis

Binomial name
- Meriones grandis Cabrera, 1907

= Moroccan jird =

Species of rodent

The Moroccan jird (Meriones grandis) is a species of rodent from the family Muridae. The species was first described by Ángel Cabrera in 1907. It is endemic to Morocco, northern Algeria, and Tunisia. It had been included as part of Shaw's jird (Meriones shawi), but was considered in 2000 to be a separate species.
