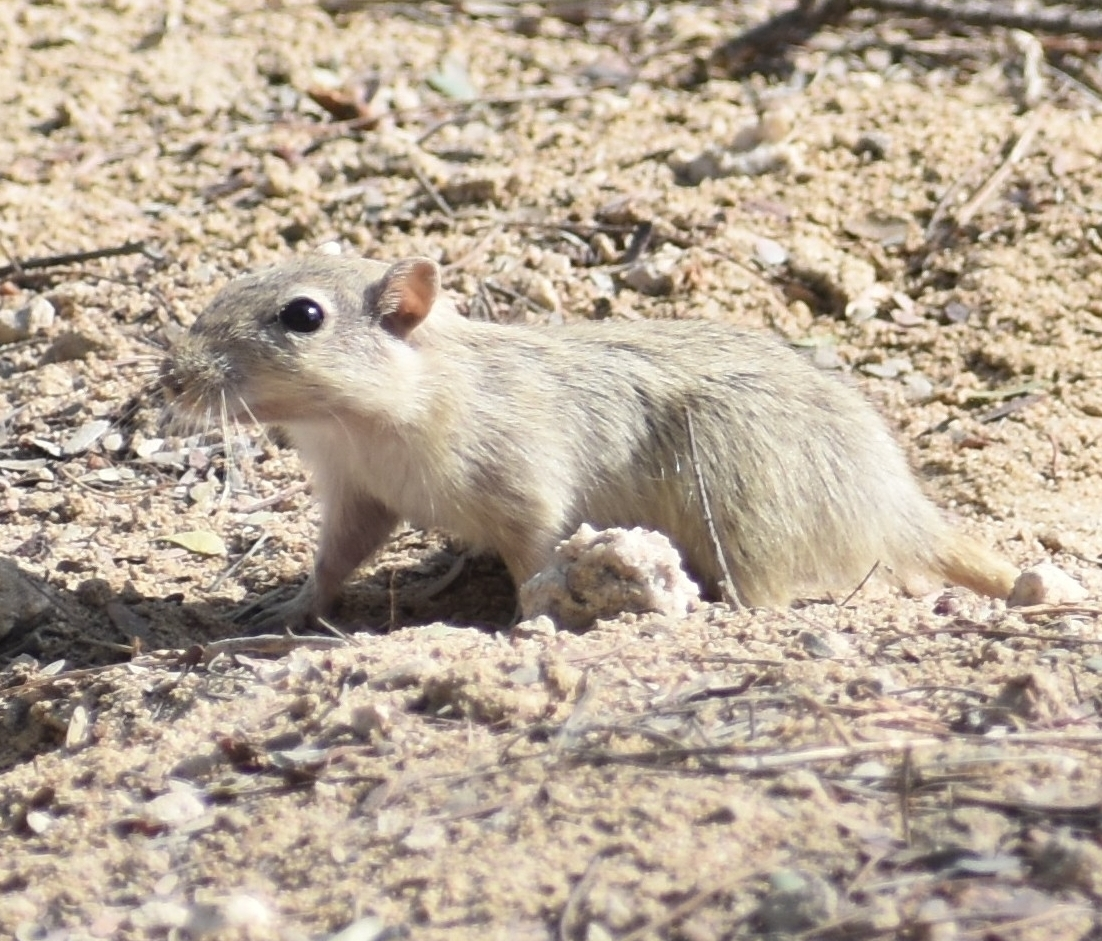

Conservation status
- Least Concern (IUCN 3.1)

Scientific classification
- Kingdom: Animalia
- Phylum: Chordata
- Class: Mammalia
- Order: Rodentia
- Family: Muridae
- Genus: Meriones
- Species: M. arimalius

Binomial name
- Meriones arimalius Cheesman & Hinton, 1924

= Arabian jird =

Species of rodent

The Arabian jird (Meriones arimalius) is a species of rodent in the family Muridae. It is found in Oman, Saudi Arabia and United Arab Emirates.

== Taxonomy ==
First described by Cheesman and Hinton in 1924, Meriones arimalius is sometimes considered a subspecies of the closely related Meriones libycus, the Libyan jird.

== Description ==
The fur is short and thin; the back is "sandy-cream" colored, the bottom is white, and the tail is "ivory to yellow, with a white tuft of hairs at the end". This type of specimen is 132 millimetres (5.2 in) long, with a 163 millimetres (6.4 in) long tail. The ears are 18 millimetres (0.71 in) and the hind feet 37 millimetres (1.5 in).

== Distribution, ecology, and conservation status ==
Little is known about the Arabian jird's behavior, distribution, or abundance in its range. It has been found in the Rub al Khali desert in Oman and Saudi Arabia, and may occur in the United Arab Emirates as well. It is listed as a species of Least Concern by the IUCN despite the limited information, as it is widely distributed and its habitat is not under threat.

Known predators of the Arabian jird include the sand cat, felis margarita. It is known to dig burrows and use them as shelter when threatened. It eats Abutilon fruticosum seeds.
