= Dahl's jird =

Conservation status
- Critically Endangered (IUCN 3.1)

Scientific classification
- Kingdom: Animalia
- Phylum: Chordata
- Class: Mammalia
- Infraclass: Placentalia
- Order: Rodentia
- Family: Muridae
- Genus: Meriones
- Species: M. dahli

Binomial name
- Meriones dahli Shidlovsky, 1962

Species of rodent

Dahl's jird (Meriones dahli) is a species of rodent in the family Muridae. It is found only in Armenia and the neighboring Agri province of Turkey.

Physically, the Dahl's jird most often has dark and brightly colored fur on its back with a lighter abdomen and black tail. Its external appearance led many to presume that the Dahl's jird was a subspecies of the midday jird (M. meridianus), but it has been ranked up to a full species.
