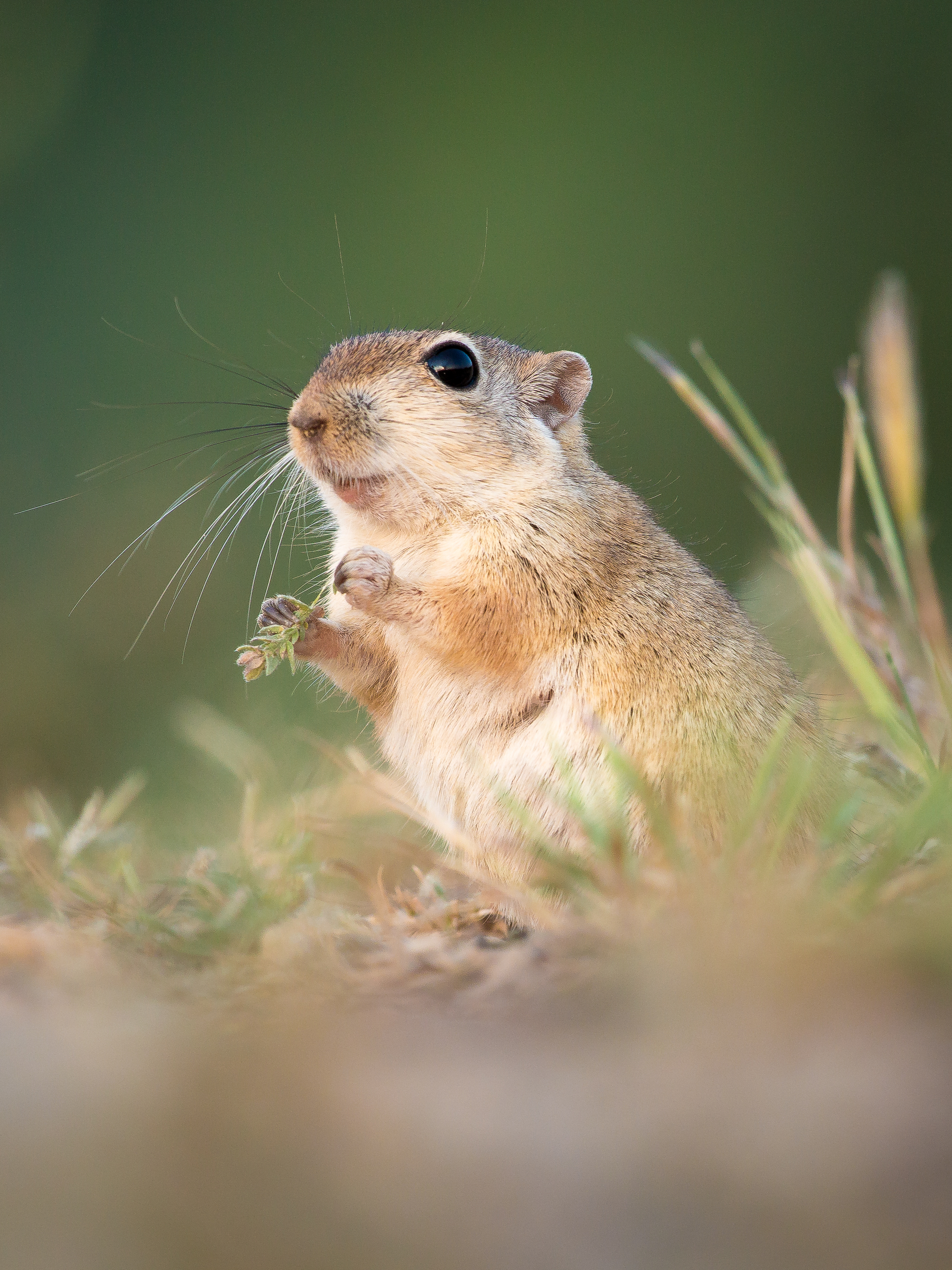
- At Tal Chhapar Sanctuary, Churu District, Rajasthan, India

Conservation status
- Least Concern (IUCN 3.1)

Scientific classification
- Kingdom: Animalia
- Phylum: Chordata
- Class: Mammalia
- Order: Rodentia
- Family: Muridae
- Genus: Meriones
- Species: M. hurrianae

Binomial name
- Meriones hurrianae Jerdon, 1867

= Indian desert jird =

Species of rodent

The Indian desert jird or Indian desert gerbil (Meriones hurrianae) is a species of jird found mainly in the Thar Desert in India. Jirds are closely related to gerbils.

== Distribution ==
The Indian desert jird is found in southeastern Iran and Pakistan to northwestern India. In India they can be found in Rajasthan and Gujarat.

== Description ==
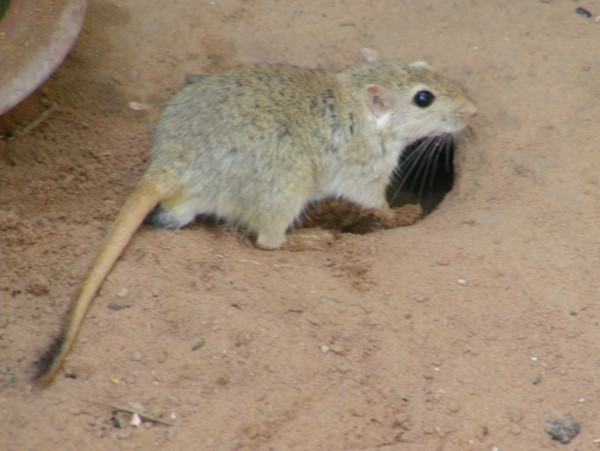
Meriones hurrianae

The Indian desert jird has a grey-brown coat with yellowish-grey belly. It is approximately 12–14 centimetres (4.7–5.5 in) long and has a tail 10–15 cm (3.9–5.9 in) long. The distinguishing characteristics include short ears, long black claws and orange incisors.

== Habitat ==
Jirds inhabit desert and barren areas preferring firm soil. They are not to be found in pure sand dunes or rocky outcrops.

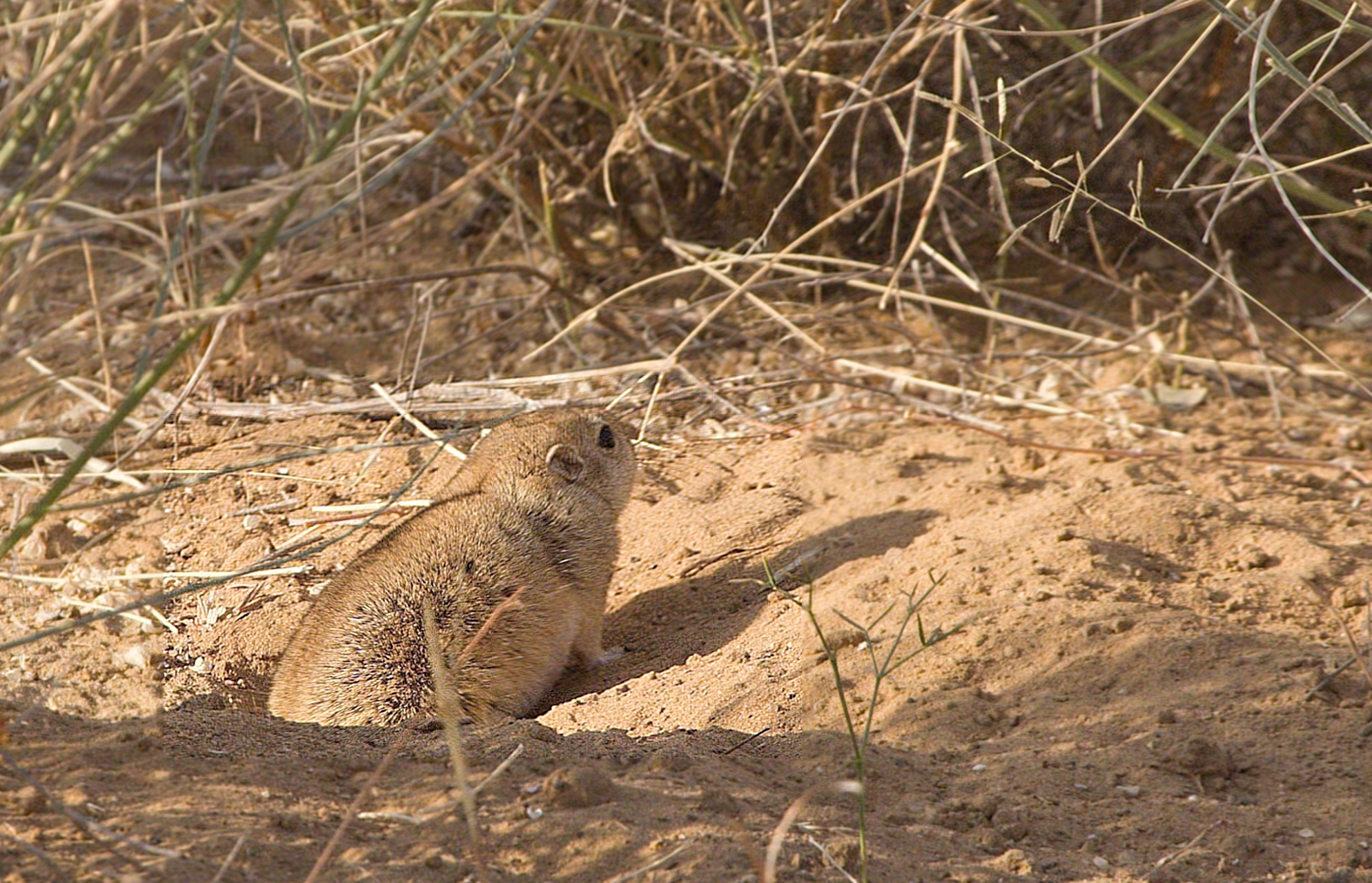
Desert jird found at Desert National Park, Jaisalmer, Rajasthan

== Habits ==
The jirds are gregarious and their burrows are seen close by. Each jird will have at least two or more entrances to his burrow complex. Often the entrance is in the shade of a tree or near the trunk of bushes. They feed on seeds, roots, nuts, grasses and insects.

== Difference between 'jirds' and 'gerbils' ==
Jirds are closely related to gerbils but can be distinguished by the lack of long hind feet and the characteristic erect posture of a gerbil. The tail of a jird is generally shorter than the head and body. It also has much shorter ears. In addition, the Indian desert jird is diurnal, in comparison to the three common gerbil species found in India which are nocturnal.
