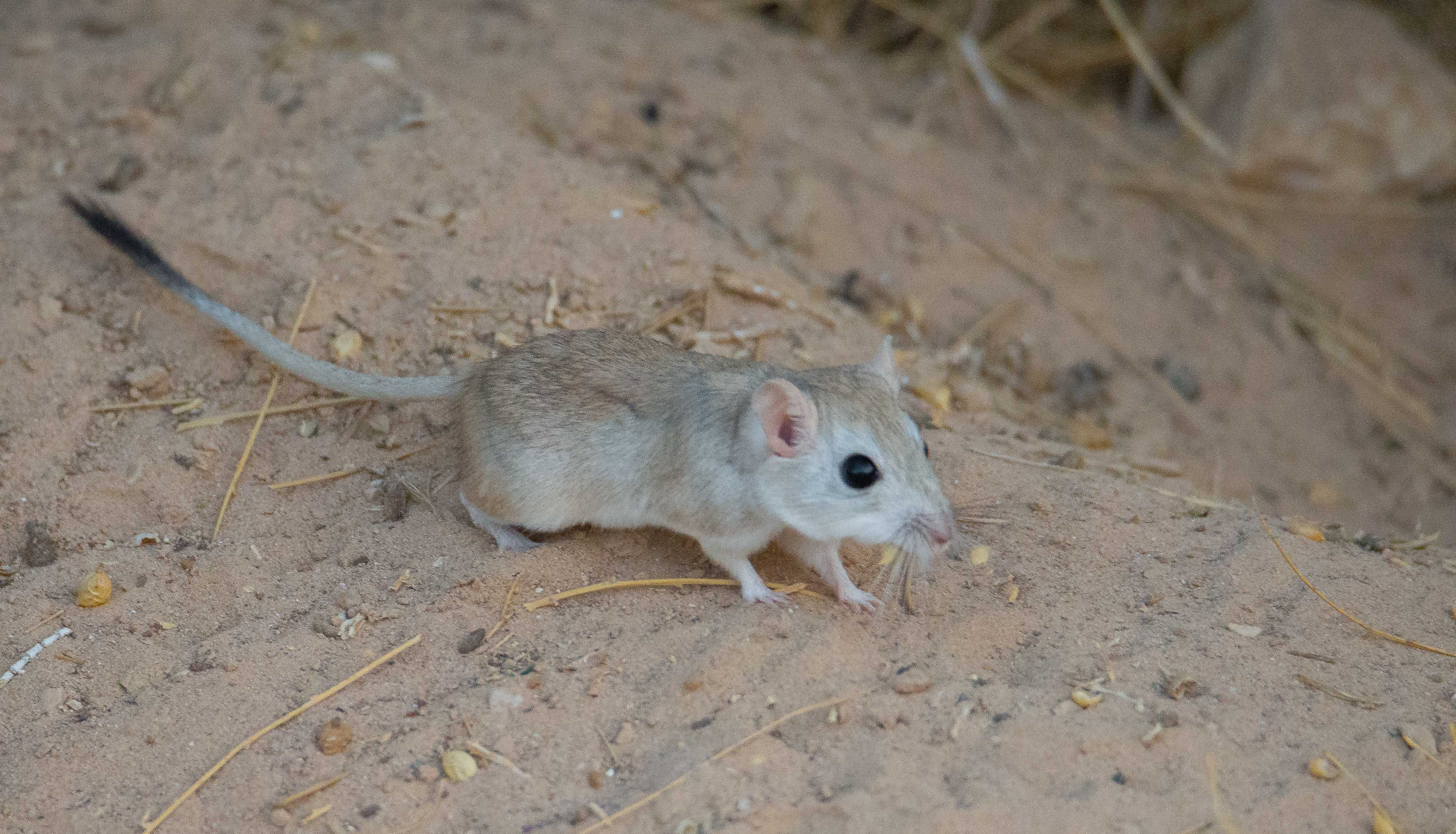

Conservation status
- Vulnerable (IUCN 3.1)

Scientific classification
- Kingdom: Animalia
- Phylum: Chordata
- Class: Mammalia
- Order: Rodentia
- Family: Muridae
- Genus: Meriones
- Species: M. sacramenti

Binomial name
- Meriones sacramenti Thomas, 1922

= Buxton's jird =

Species of rodent

Buxton's jird (Meriones sacramenti) is a species of rodent in the family Muridae. It is found in the Negev desert and the northern coastal parts of the Sinai Peninsula.

== Etymology ==
This species is named for the British hunter and conservationist Sir Edward North Buxton, a founder of the Society for the Preservation of the Wild Fauna of the Empire, which has since grown to become the prominent conservation organisation Flora and Fauna International.

== Description ==
Buxton's jird has dark cinnamon-brown fur and a conspicuous black brushy tail. As in other jirds, the pelage of Buxton's jird is fairly long, soft and dense on the body, while the fur on the tail is short near the base and becomes progressively longer towards the tip. In most Meriones species, the sides of the body are generally lighter than the back, and there are often lighter areas around the face. The underparts are usually white, pale yellowish, buff or pale grey. The feet of Buxton's jird are pale, with strong, pale claws. Body length is 14–19 centimetres (5.5–7.5 in) and tail length 11–17 centimetres (4.3–6.7 in).

Jirds typically have narrow, well-developed ears and a long tail which measures almost the same as the head-body length. Most species have slightly elongated hind legs for leaping. Buxton's jird has a more robust and angular skull than other Meriones species.

== Distribution and habitat ==
The species is endemic to the coastal region of northern Sinai (Egypt) and Israel, where it is found in the northern Negev desert and on the coastal plain south of the Yarkon River. An inhabitant of arid, sandy environments, its habitat consists primarily of coastal dunes, deserts, and arid steppes, all with fairly limited vegetation. It has also been observed in cultivated fields, grassland and mountain valleys.

== Biology ==
Buxton's jird spends most of its time in burrows. Species in its genus dig their burrow in soft soil, and the complexity of the burrow can vary greatly within and between different species. Burrows may be built several metres underground, with multiple entrances and a system of complex, interlinking tunnels and galleries, while others are located at much shallower depths and have fewer entrances and tunnels. The burrow usually has several food storage chambers which are often positioned near to the surface, as well as one or more nest chambers deeper underground.

The burrow is usually home to a mated pair and their most recent litter. Despite being fairly territorial and aggressive towards unknown intruders, jirds will usually tolerate family members, and some species may even sometimes share the burrow with another family.

There is very little specific information available on the breeding biology of Buxton's jird. However, based on the behaviour of other Meriones species in Central Asia, the Caucasus and the Middle East, it is likely that breeding takes place throughout the year, with peaks in breeding activity from late winter to early autumn. Females of most species produce two to three litters each year. Gestation is thought to last for between 20 and 31 days in most species, and litter sizes of 1 to 12 young have been reported. Buxton's jird gives birth to the young in a nest, which is usually composed of dried vegetation.

Jirds are not thought to hibernate, although some species are known enter torpor, while others remain underground throughout the winter and live entirely off stored food. It is likely that the diet of Buxton's jird is similar to most other species in the genus, consisting mainly of a variety of green vegetation, roots, bulbs, seeds, cereals, fruits and insects. Buxton's jird may eat more leaves than other Meriones species.

== Conservation ==
The Buxton's jird is classified as vulnerable on the IUCN Red List. Habitat loss is a major threat, caused by urbanisation in the eastern parts of its range and land conversion to agricultural use particularly in southern Israel. The northern coastal plain of Israel has reduced by more than half since the mid-1900s, and the expanding population and increasing development in the region continue to place increased pressure on the coastal habitats of Buxton's jird.

Although Buxton's jird is not the target of any known specific conservation measures, it does occur in a number of protected areas in southern Israel which may afford it some level of protection.
