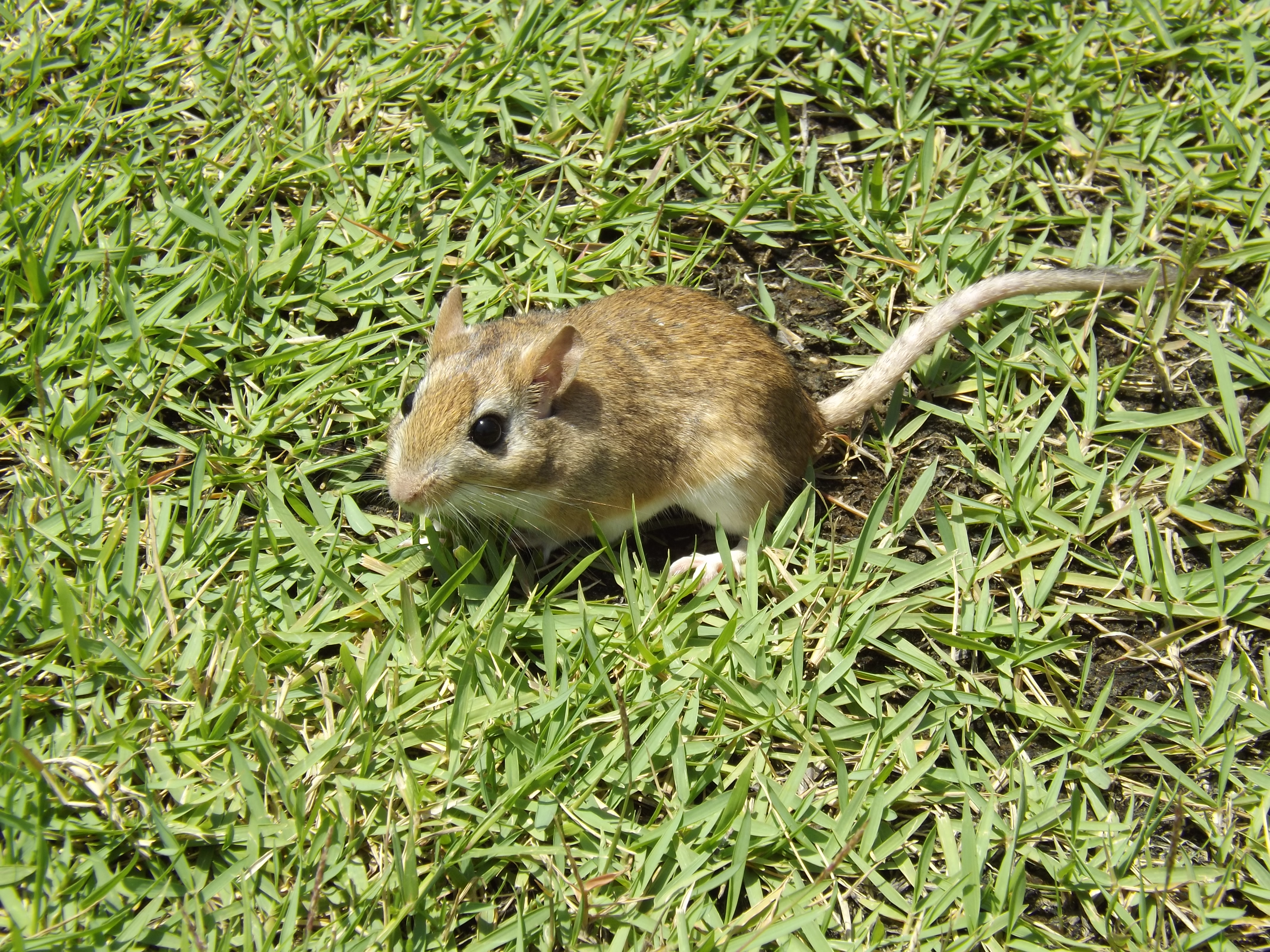

Conservation status
- Least Concern (IUCN 3.1)

Scientific classification
- Kingdom: Animalia
- Phylum: Chordata
- Class: Mammalia
- Order: Rodentia
- Family: Muridae
- Genus: Meriones
- Species: M. tristrami

Binomial name
- Meriones tristrami Thomas, 1892

Synonyms
- Meriones blackleri Thomas, 1903; Meriones lycaon Thomas, 1919; Meriones bodenheimeri Aharoni, 1932; Meriones kariateni Aharoni, 1932; Meriones bogdanovi Heptner, 1931; Meriones intraponticus Neuhäuser, 1936; Meriones qatafensis Haas, 1951; Meriones kilisensis Yiğit and Çolak, 1998

= Tristram's jird =

Species of rodent

Tristram's jird (Meriones tristrami) is a species of rodent that lives in the Middle East. It is named after the Reverend Henry Baker Tristram who collected the first specimens. It is up to 155 mm (6.1 in) long, and lives in burrows in steppes and semi-deserts from Turkey and the Caucasus to Israel and Iran. Records from the Greek island of Kos represent the only gerbils reported from Europe, outside the former Soviet Union. It is a common, widespread species, and is not considered to be threatened.

== Description ==
Meriones tristrami reaches a total length (excluding the tail) of 100–155 millimetres (3.9–6.1 in), with a skull around 32–40 mm (1.3–1.6 in) long. Its fur is "dark yellowish-brown" on its back, "yellowish orange" on its sides, and white on the belly. The soles of its hind feet are hairless at the heels, and it has a much smaller auditory bulla than the other jirds that occur in the same region. The tail is bi-colored, and ends in an inconspicuous black tuft, about one quarter of the length of the tail.

== Distribution and ecology ==
Meriones tristrami is found from Turkey in the west, to the Caucasus (Armenia, Azerbaijan), and south through Iraq, Syria, Lebanon and Israel to Jordan and Iran. It has also been recorded from the Greek island of Kos, although it has not been seen there for more than a decade. The records of M. tristrami from Kos are the only reports of a gerbil from a European country (excluding the former Soviet Union), or from an island in the eastern Mediterranean Sea. Fossil evidence, however, shows that it has lived in the southern Levant for at least 160,000 years.

It lives in semi-deserts and steppes, and is supposedly limited to areas receiving an annual total precipitation of at least 100 millimetres (3.9 in). It feeds on various seeds and leaves, but although it lives in burrows, it does not store any food there.

== Taxonomy ==
Meriones tristrami was first described by Oldfield Thomas in 1892. He based his description on type material from the Dead Sea region of Israel collected by "Canon H. B. Tristram" (Henry Baker Tristram), who is commemorated in the specific epithet tristrami. It is classified in the subgenus Pallasiomys of the gerbil genus Meriones, and its members have sometimes been included within the species Meriones shawi.

A number of subspecies have been described within M. tristrami, but the genetic differences between them are slight, and no subspecies are recognised in Mammal Species of the World.

== Conservation ==
Meriones tristrami has a wide geographical range, including many protected areas, and has no serious threats. It is therefore listed as being of Least Concern on the IUCN Red List.
