= Zarudny's jird =

Conservation status
- Data Deficient (IUCN 3.1)

Scientific classification
- Kingdom: Animalia
- Phylum: Chordata
- Class: Mammalia
- Order: Rodentia
- Family: Muridae
- Genus: Meriones
- Species: M. zarudnyi

Binomial name
- Meriones zarudnyi Heptner, 1937

Species of rodent

Zarudny's jird (Meriones zarudnyi) is a species of rodent in the family Muridae. It is found in Afghanistan, Iran, and Turkmenistan.
