= Vinogradov's jird =

Conservation status
- Least Concern (IUCN 3.1)

Scientific classification
- Kingdom: Animalia
- Phylum: Chordata
- Class: Mammalia
- Order: Rodentia
- Family: Muridae
- Genus: Meriones
- Species: M. vinogradovi

Binomial name
- Meriones vinogradovi Heptner, 1931

Species of rodent

Vinogradov's jird (Meriones vinogradovi) is a species of rodent in the family Muridae. It is found in Armenia, Azerbaijan, Iran, Syria, and Turkey.

== See also ==
- Vinogradov's jerboa
