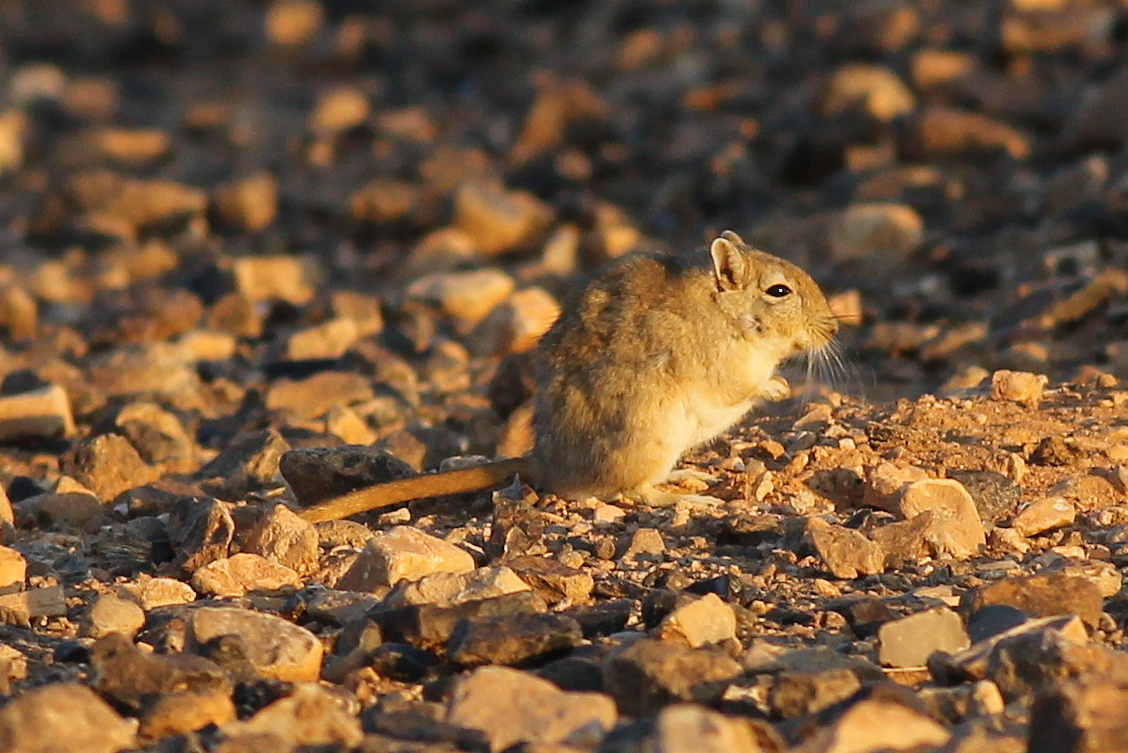

Conservation status
- Least Concern (IUCN 3.1)

Scientific classification
- Kingdom: Animalia
- Phylum: Chordata
- Class: Mammalia
- Order: Rodentia
- Family: Muridae
- Genus: Meriones
- Species: M. libycus

Binomial name
- Meriones libycus Lichtenstein, 1823

= Libyan jird =

Species of rodent

The Libyan jird (Meriones libycus) is a species of rodent in the family Muridae. It is found in Mauritania, Morocco, Algeria, Tunisia, Libya, Egypt, Jordan, Syria, Saudi Arabia, Iran, Iraq, Afghanistan, Turkmenistan, Uzbekistan, Kazakhstan and Western China. Its natural habitats are subtropical or tropical dry shrubland, intermittent saline lakes, hot deserts, and rural gardens.

== Description ==
The Libyan jird is a large species of jird with a head-and-body length of 100 to 160 mm (3.9 to 6.3 in), a similar-length tail and a weight of 56 to 105 g (2.0 to 3.7 oz). The head is broad with large eyes, the fur is fine and dense and the hind legs are long. The upper parts are greyish-brown, darker in colour than the midday jird (Meriones meridianus), which is usually smaller. The hairs on the underside have white tips and grey bases whereas the midday jird has all-white underparts apart from a brownish chest stripe. The tail is pale brown except for the terminal third of the tail which is deep brown or blackish. The claws are dark-coloured, and the soles of the hind feet are partly hairy so that patches of bare skin are visible. In parts of its range it may be confused with Sundevall's jird (Meriones crassus) but that species is smaller, has pale claws and a smaller dark tail tuft.

== Distribution and habitat ==
The Libyan jird is native to North Africa and parts of Western and Central Asia. Its range extends from Mauritania and Morocco to Saudi Arabia, the Near East, Kazakhstan and Western China. Its typical habitat includes deserts and semi-deserts, river floodplains, wadis and areas with stable sand-dunes. It sometimes occurs in arable land.

== Ecology ==
The Libyan jird may live alone or in small colonies, and is more sociable in winter when colonies may contain twenty or thirty individuals. It inhabits a burrow up to 1.5 m (5 ft) deep which is a fairly complex series of passages with multiple entrances; an empty burrow of the great gerbil (Rhombomys opimus) may be used. The Libyan jird is a diurnal species and forages for seeds, bulbs, tubers and leaves, as well as any dead insect it may find. It often carries the food back to the burrow and here large quantities are stored in chambers near the surface, deeper burrows being used for nesting. It is opportunistically migratory, moving to new territory when food becomes scarce. Breeding takes place throughout most of the year with several litters of about five young being born.

In the man-made desert known as Aralkum that has been formed as a result of the shrinkage of the Aral Sea, the Libyan jird has made use of the new habitat where it lives alongside other small rodents including the northern three-toed jerboa, the midday jird and the great gerbil. These rodents are about four times more abundant on the dried-up seabed than in the surrounding terrain, and the presence of this abundance of rodent prey has attracted carnivores such as the red fox, the corsac fox, the mountain weasel, the steppe polecat, the marbled polecat and the Turkestan wildcat.

The Libyan jird has many adaptations to survive the extreme desert environments where it lives. These adaptations include a nocturnal lifestyle, burrowing behavior, and water conservation through excretion of concentrated urine. In a study done on two different species of jirds exposed to 12 days of light and 12 days of dark, it was seen that even with disrupted light and dark patterns the Libyan jird exhibited natural rhythms to maintain its normal circadian routine. Being nearly completely nocturnal helps the jird avoid the desert heat. Burrowing behavior also helps the jird regulate its body temperature and get out of the heat. During hot summer days, the jird's body temperature maintained an average of 38.20°C with a 0.87°C fluctuation. In the winter, it was 37.0°C with a 0.22°C fluctuation. By keeping its body warmer in the summer, the jird may avoid some of the water loss necessary for evaporative cooling, helping it to survive the hot summer.

== Status ==
The Libyan jird is a common species in suitable habitat across its wide range. It is presumed to have a large total population and is regarded as a pest in some areas where it is present in cropland. No special threats to this species have been identified, and the International Union for Conservation of Nature has assessed its conservation status as being of "least concern".
