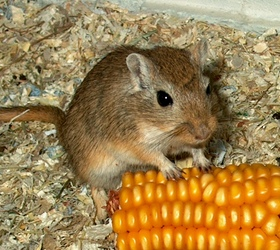
- Mongolian gerbil (Meriones unguiculatus)

Scientific classification
- Kingdom: Animalia
- Phylum: Chordata
- Class: Mammalia
- Order: Rodentia
- Family: Muridae
- Subtribe: Gerbillina
- Genus: Meriones; Illiger, 1811

Type species
- Mus tamariscinus

Subgenera
- Meriones; Parameriones; Pallasiomys; Cheliones

= Meriones (rodent) =

Meriones Temporal range: Early Pleistocene – Recent

Genus of rodents

Meriones is a rodent genus that includes the gerbil most commonly kept as a pet, Meriones unguiculatus. The genus contains most animals referred to as jirds, but members of the genera Sekeetamys, Brachiones, and sometimes Pachyuromys are also known as jirds. The distribution of Meriones ranges from northern Africa to Mongolia. Meriones jirds tend to inhabit arid regions including clay desert, sandy desert, and steppe, but are also in slightly wetter regions, and are an agricultural pest.

The genus was named by Illiger in 1811, deriving from the Ancient Greek word μηρός "femur". However the name is shared with Greek warrior Meriones in Homer's Iliad which has brought confusion to the meaning of the scientific names, specially for the popular pet Mongolian gerbil.

== Description ==
Adult Meriones species range in size from 9 to 18 cm (head and body), with tails equal to or slightly longer than the rest of the animals. Weights vary widely by species, but is generally between 30 and 200 grams.

They are more rat-like in appearance than many other gerbillines, but are still capable of leaping. They have strong front claws, used to dig their burrows.

== Natural history ==
They construct burrows to aid in food storage, temperature regulation and water retention. The burrows of some species are rather simple, but others can be quite complex. Meriones crassus adults have been reported to have burrows with a combined length of over 30 meters and have 18 entrances. Food is stored in chambers of the burrows. As with other arid adapted rodents, stored food has the capacity to reabsorb moisture given off by the animal during respiration. Jirds can go their entire lives without drinking, relying instead on water generated during metabolism. These rodents feed on roots, seeds, fruits, and insects.

Members of the genus range from being social to rather solitary. Even in solitary species, home ranges often overlap. Females give birth to one to 12 young after a gestation period of about 20–30 days. Sexual maturity is reached after about 9–15 weeks. Longevity in the wild is usually less than six months, but the record for a captive animal is over five years.

== Classification ==
Pavlinov et al. considered the genus to belong to the (sub)tribe Rhombomyina, a group of mostly Asian gerbils. Tong's hypothesized relationship is consistent, and the taxonomy of Pavlinov et al. was adopted by Musser and Carleton. McKenna and Bell (1997) use the subtribe name Merionina (presumably arguing it has priority) for the same group.

In particular, Meriones is thought by Pavlinov et al. (1990) to be sister (cladistically closest) to the genus Brachiones. Tong (1989), however, suggests Psammomys is its sister genus.

The 17 species of Meriones jirds are divided into four subgenera.

Genus Meriones

- Subgenus Meriones
  - Tamarisk jird, Meriones tamariscinus
- Subgenus Parameriones
  - Persian jird, Meriones persicus
  - King jird, Meriones rex
- Subgenus Pallasiomys
  - Arabian jird, Meriones arimalius
  - Cheng's jird, Meriones chengi
  - Sundevall's jird, Meriones crassus
  - Dahl's jird, Meriones dahli
  - Moroccan jird, Meriones grandis
  - Libyan jird, Meriones libycus
  - Midday jird, Meriones meridianus
  - Buxton's jird, Meriones sacramenti
  - Shaw's jird, Meriones shawi
  - Tristram's jird, Meriones tristrami
  - Mongolian gerbil or Mongolian jird, Meriones unguiculatus
  - Vinogradov's jird, Meriones vinogradovi
  - Zarudny's jird, Meriones zarudnyi
- Subgenus Cheliones
  - Indian desert jird, Meriones hurrianae
