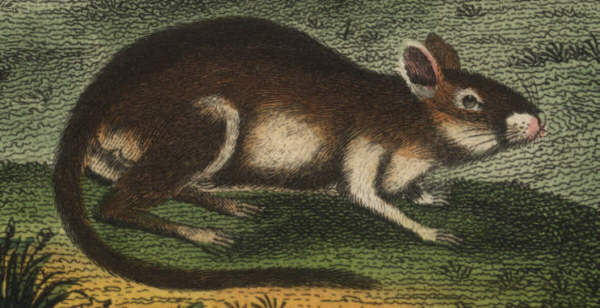

Conservation status
- Least Concern (IUCN 3.1)

Scientific classification
- Kingdom: Animalia
- Phylum: Chordata
- Class: Mammalia
- Order: Rodentia
- Family: Muridae
- Genus: Meriones
- Species: M. tamariscinus

Binomial name
- Meriones tamariscinus (Pallas, 1773)

Synonyms
- Mus tamariscinus Pallas, 1773

= Tamarisk jird =

Species of mammals belonging to the gerbil subfamily of rodents

The tamarisk jird or tamarisk gerbil (Meriones tamariscinus) is a species of rodent in the family Muridae. It is found in China, Mongolia, Kazakhstan, Kyrgyzstan, Russia, Turkmenistan, and Uzbekistan. It prefers habitats with grass or shrub cover.

Tamarisk jirds are relatively large in size (an adult can weigh 100–140 g). They are poorly adapted for digestion of cellulose and mainly feed on plant sources such as young leaves, and require large amounts of water.

The tamarisk jird is a nocturnal animal and is also a strictly solitary animal. Males usually occupy larger home ranges compared to females, and interactions between individuals are very rare. Tamarisk jirds breed between March and October, usually producing 2–3 litters. Young jirds first emerge from their burrows between May and June, and they quickly disperse, rarely interacting with their siblings and mother. Tamarisk jirds reach sexual maturity at 70 days, but young males do not mate in their first year of age. For young females, less than half have been observed to breed in their first year of age, and this delay has been proposed to be associated with their delay in migration from their birth site.
