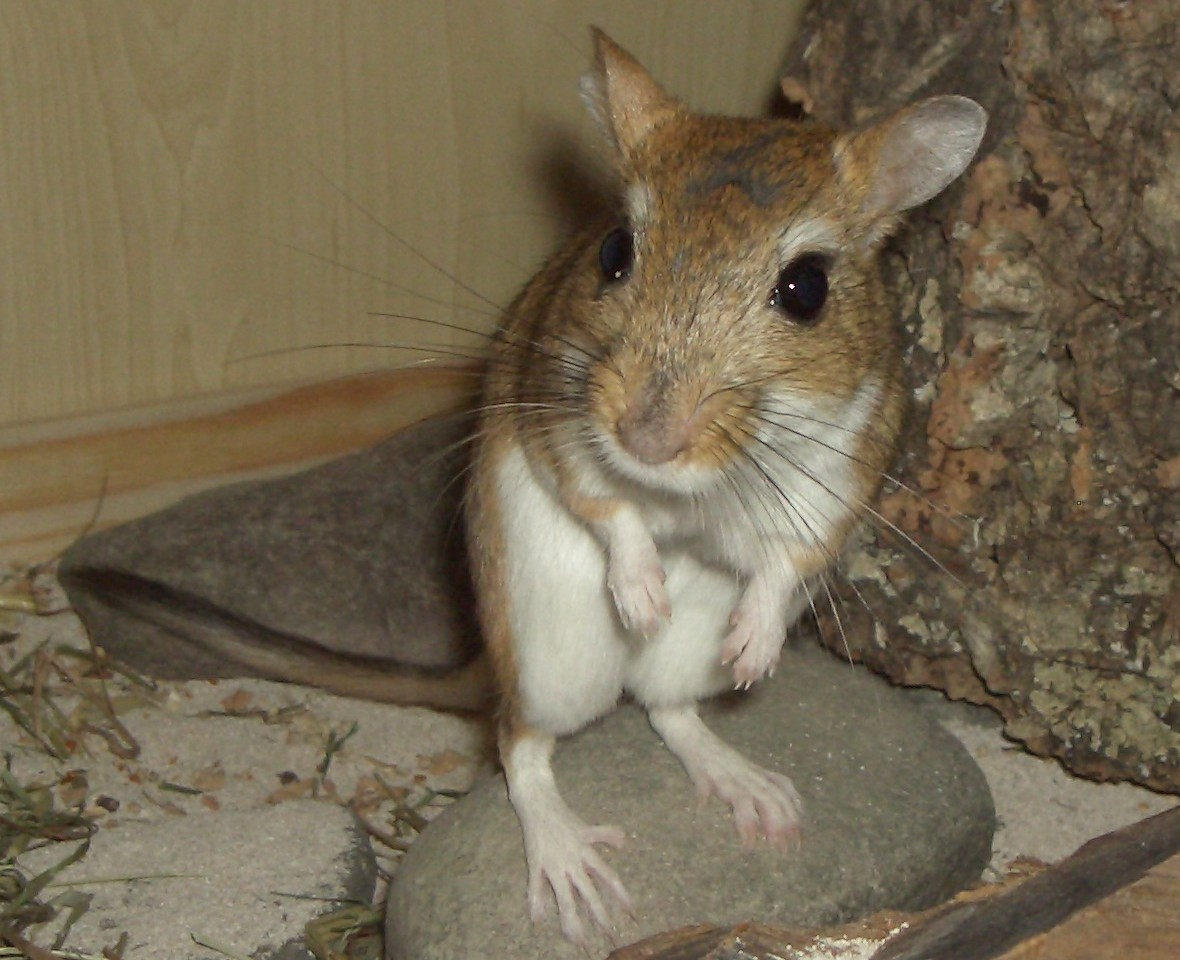

Conservation status
- Least Concern (IUCN 3.1)

Scientific classification
- Kingdom: Animalia
- Phylum: Chordata
- Class: Mammalia
- Order: Rodentia
- Family: Muridae
- Genus: Meriones
- Species: M. persicus

Binomial name
- Meriones persicus (Blanford, 1875)

= Persian jird =

Species of rodent

The Persian jird (Meriones persicus) is a species of rodent in the family Muridae found in Afghanistan, Armenia, Azerbaijan, India, Iran, Iraq, Pakistan, Saudi Arabia, Turkey and Turkmenistan.

The Persian jird is about 6 inches (15 cm) long and has a brush-tipped tail that is slightly longer than the body. They are brown with white bellies.

The Persian jird's natural habitats are dry rocky hillsides with little vegetation and semi-desert areas. They find shelter in either small burrows or under overhanging rocks. These jirds can also be found living near humans, such as under walls.

In the wild, Persian jirds eat dry plant material and grains, with small insects as a supplement.

Persian jirds usually have two litters a year, each with around seven pups.

Some people keep this species as a pet. They can live to be six or seven years old. They need large cages that allow climbing and leaping. The high abundance of Persian jird in many areas, as well as their several proper features, makes them a suitable species for biomonitoring programs.
