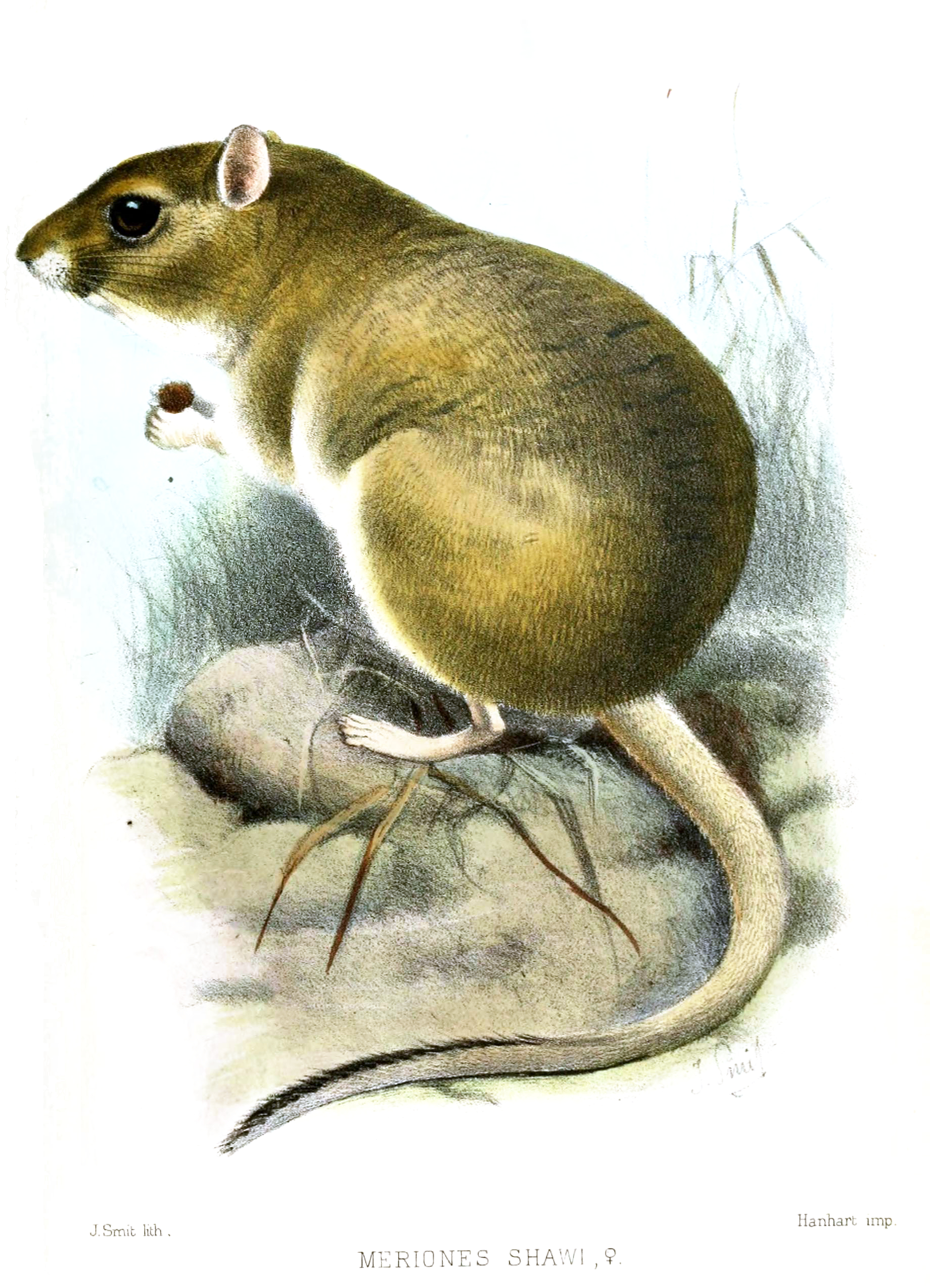

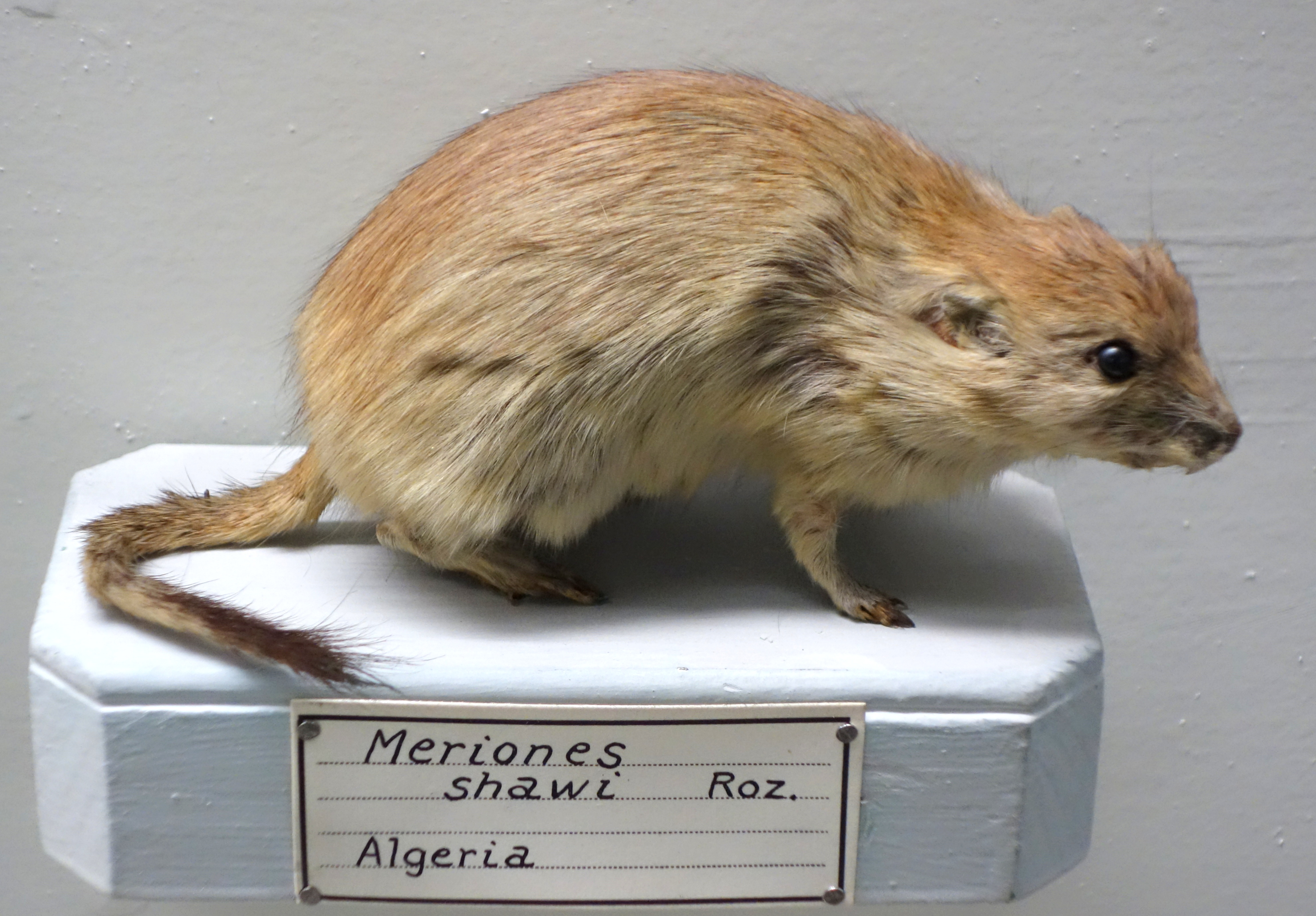

Conservation status
- Least Concern (IUCN 3.1)

Scientific classification
- Kingdom: Animalia
- Phylum: Chordata
- Class: Mammalia
- Order: Rodentia
- Family: Muridae
- Genus: Meriones
- Species: M. shawi

Binomial name
- Meriones shawi (Duvernoy, 1842)

= Shaw's jird =

Species of rodent found in Northern Africa

Shaw's jird (Meriones shawi) is a species of rodent in the family Muridae. It is found in Algeria, Egypt, Libya, Morocco, and Tunisia. Its natural habitats are arable land, pastureland, and rural gardens.

The Shaw's jird is a relatively large, gerbil-like rodent about the size of a rat. An adult male may grow to 14 inches (36 cm) long including the tail, which comprises about half this length. Males tend to be slightly larger and more heavily built (up to 6 ounces (170 g)) than females (5 ounces (140 g). The animal has a sandy base coat that is usually quite dark, although it can be found in lighter shades. Occasionally there is a white head spot. Jirds have larger, less hairy ears than a Mongolian gerbil.

The Shaw's jird is able to survive long periods of dehydration in semi-desert regions where it lives, in part because of its well-developed kidneys. A Shaw's jird can mate 224 times in two hours. During the rainy season, Shaw's jirds breed more than in the summer when there is less rain. They typically live 1–2 years. In the Algerian highlands, they are a main prey source for barn owls.
