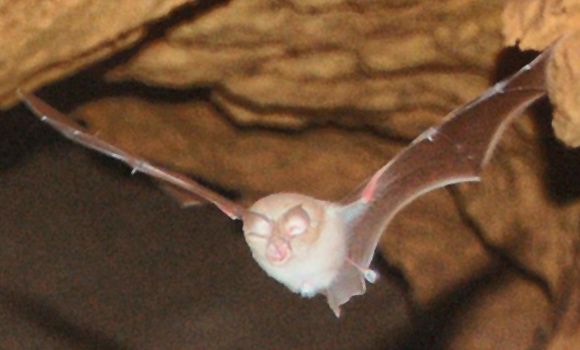

Conservation status
- Near Threatened (IUCN 3.1)

Scientific classification
- Kingdom: Animalia
- Phylum: Chordata
- Class: Mammalia
- Order: Chiroptera
- Family: Rhinolophidae
- Genus: Rhinolophus
- Species: R. euryale

Binomial name
- Rhinolophus euryale Blasius, 1853
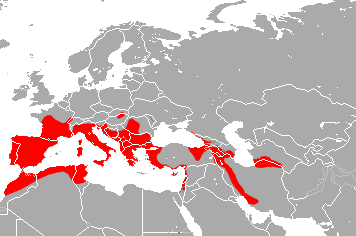
- Mediterranean horseshoe bat range

= Mediterranean horseshoe bat =

Species of bat

The Mediterranean horseshoe bat (Rhinolophus euryale) is a species of insectivorous bat in the family Rhinolophidae. It is found in the Mediterranean region and Balkan peninsula, as well as parts of Italy.

== Physical characteristics ==
The head and body are normally between 43 and 58 millimetres (1.7 and 2.3 in), with a 22–30 millimetres (0.87–1.18 in) tail. The wingspan of R. euryale is between 30 and 32 centimetres (12 and 13 in), with a standard weight between 8 and 17.5 grams (0.28 and 0.62 oz). The upper connecting process is pointed and slightly bent downwards, and is distinctly longer than the lower connecting process, which is broadly rounded when seen from below.

The fur is fluffy, with a light grey base. The dorsal side is grey-brown, with sometimes a slight reddish tinge, while the ventral side is grey-white or yellow-white.

== Biology and behaviour ==
There is little known information about the Mediterranean horseshoe bat's reproductive cycle. Nurseries normally hold between 50 and 400 females, with males sometimes present. The colonies in the summer and winter are very large and they are surrounded by small satellite colonies. The main colonies are in caves and can include over 5,000 animals, the satellite colonies include dozens to hundreds of animals. In the summer, colonies are mixed with other species. In Bulgaria the Mediterranean Horseshoe bat is living with the Blasius's horseshoe bat and the Mehely's horseshoe bat. The species is very sensitive to disturbance. The birth occurs from mid-June or July. At the age of four weeks, the young become independent. Females give their first birth at the age of 2–3 years. Mating takes place in the Autumn in caves, but may continue in the winter roosts.

== Conservation ==
As of 2016, the Mediterranean Horseshoe bat is listed as Near Threatened on the IUCN Red List with reports of general population decline in the last 27 years. The general population decline is attributed to the increase in agriculture and urbanization causing the loss of vegetation R. euryale uses to forage for insects. R. euryale mainly roost in caves and underground shelters, making them prone to disturbances from caving or cave tourism. Protecting their roosting sites is considered an important long term conservation strategy.
