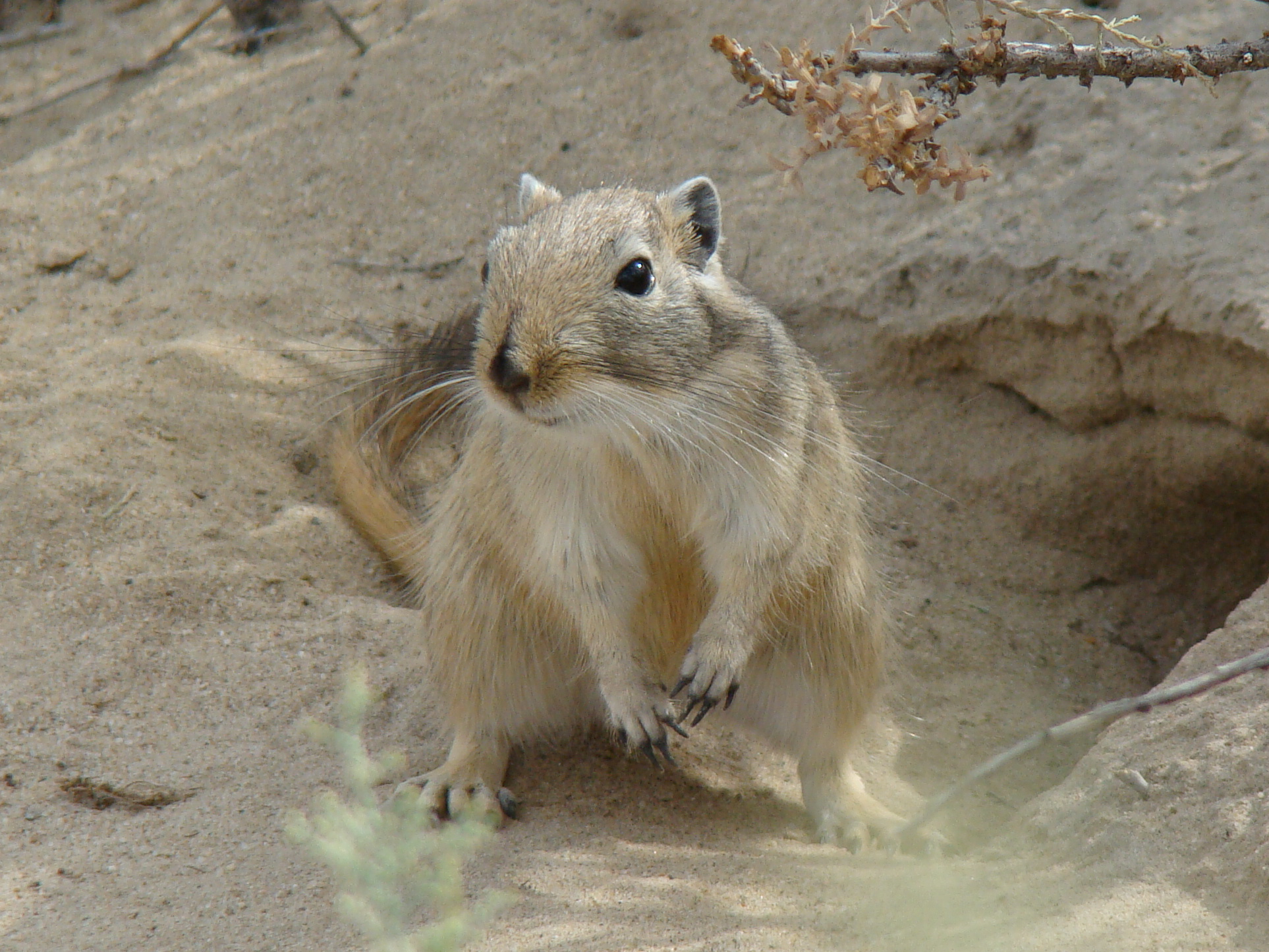

Conservation status
- Least Concern (IUCN 3.1)

Scientific classification
- Kingdom: Animalia
- Phylum: Chordata
- Class: Mammalia
- Order: Rodentia
- Family: Muridae
- Genus: Rhombomys; Wagner, 1841
- Species: R. opimus

Binomial name
- Rhombomys opimus (Lichtenstein, 1823)

= Great gerbil =

Great gerbil Temporal range: Late Pliocene–Recent

Species of rodent

The great gerbil (Rhombomys opimus) is a large rodent found throughout much of Central Asia.

== Description ==
The largest of the gerbils, great gerbils have a head and body length of 15–20 cm (6–8 in). Their skulls are distinctive by having two grooves in each incisor. They have large front claws used for burrowing.

== Distribution and habitat ==
Great gerbils are found in arid habitats, predominantly in sandy or clay deserts. They are found in Turkmenistan, Kazakhstan, Mongolia, China, Pakistan, Afghanistan, and Iran.

== Predators ==
The great gerbil is preyed on by foxes, owls, kites, wildcats, weasels, vultures, and cobras.

== Ecology and behavior ==
Great gerbils live in family groups and occupy one burrow per family. Their burrows can be fairly extensive with separate chambers for nests and food storage. Great gerbils spend considerably more time in the burrows during winter, but do not hibernate. They are predominantly diurnal. Food consists mostly of vegetable matter.

The animals are often colonial. Longevity is 2–4 years. Burrow system complexes have a distinctive region of cleared soil and can be seen and mapped from aerial photos and satellite images. Inhabited great gerbil burrows can be distinguished from abandoned burrows using satellite images.

Great gerbils are known reservoirs of Yersinia pestis, the bacterium that causes plague, and of Leishmania major, the causative agent of zoonotic cutaneous leishmaniasis. They are also known as crop pests and have been implicated in exacerbating erosion.
