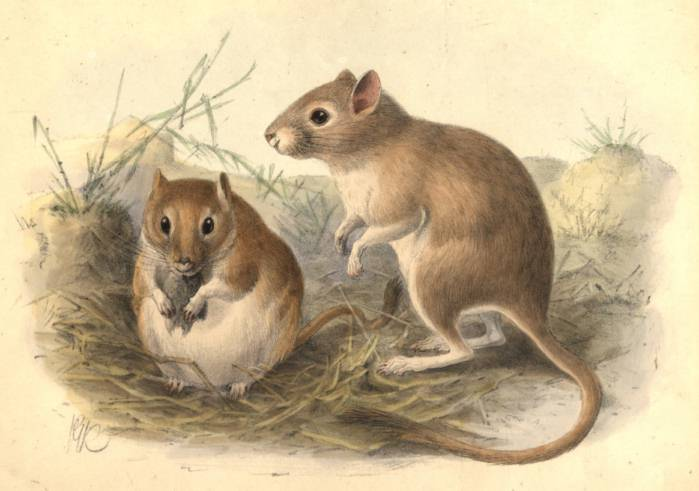

Conservation status
- Least Concern (IUCN 3.1)

Scientific classification
- Kingdom: Animalia
- Phylum: Chordata
- Class: Mammalia
- Order: Rodentia
- Family: Muridae
- Genus: Meriones
- Species: M. meridianus

Binomial name
- Meriones meridianus (Pallas, 1773)

= Midday jird =

Species of rodent

The midday jird (Meriones meridianus), also called midday gerbil, is a rodent species in the family Muridae and native to sandy deserts in Central and East Asia. It has been listed on the IUCN Red List as Least Concern since 2008.

== Description ==
The midday jird is a medium-sized species with a head-and-body length of 95 to 134 mm (3.7 to 5.3 in), a tail of a similar length, and a weight of 30 to 60 g (1.1 to 2.1 oz). The upper parts are pale yellowish-grey, drab or darker brown, the hairs having blackish bases. The underparts are white with a light brown strip across the chest. The tail is brown or ochre above and slightly paler below. The claws are white, and the soles of the hind feet are densely hairy so that no bare skin is visible.

== Distribution and habitat ==
The midday jird's range extends from Iran, Turkmenistan, Kazakhstan, Uzbekistan, Tajikistan, Kyrgyzstan, Russia to Afghanistan, Mongolia and western China. Its lives in sandy deserts, alluvial plains and especially arid sandy areas in hilly deserts with a scattering of scrub up to an elevation of 1,600 m (5,200 ft). It is a common rodent in the Aralkum area, where it has colonised the dried sea bottom.

== Behaviour and ecology ==
The midday jird lives in large colonies with complex social structures. The entrance to the burrow is usually at the base of a plant and the tunnels may extend for up to 4 m (13 ft) horizontally and half of this vertically, being deeper in winter. It is mainly nocturnal, but may emerge in daylight in autumn and winter. Its diet consists mainly of seeds and fruits, but it also eats insects and some green vegetation. It stores small amounts of food in the burrow. Breeding takes place mainly in the spring and autumn with litters averaging about six young.

== Status ==
The midday jird is a common species in suitable habitat across its wide range. It is capable of large population swings depending on the harshness of the winter weather and the availability of food. No special threats have been identified, and the International Union for Conservation of Nature has assessed its conservation status as "least concern".
