= List of mammals of Iran =

This list shows the IUCN Red List status of the 261 mammal species occurring in Iran. Two of them are critically endangered, six are endangered, 17 are vulnerable, and five are near threatened. Another 11 species are likely present. The following tags are used to highlight each species' status as assessed on the respective IUCN Red List published by the International Union for Conservation of Nature:

EX	Extinct	The last individual has died without doubt.
EW	Extinct in the wild	Known only to survive in captivity or as a naturalized populations well outside its previous range.
CR	Critically endangered	The species is in imminent risk of extinction in the wild, as only less than 250 individuals survive.
EN	Endangered	The species is facing an extremely high risk of extinction in the wild, as the population consists of less than 2500 individuals.
VU	Vulnerable	The species is facing a high risk of extinction in the wild, as the population consists of less than 10000 individuals.
NT	Near threatened	The species does not meet any of the criteria that would categorise it as risking extinction but it is likely to do so in the future.
LC	Least concern	There are no current identifiable risks to the species.
DD	Data deficient	There is inadequate information to make an assessment of the risks to this species.

== Order: Sirenia (manatees and dugongs) ==
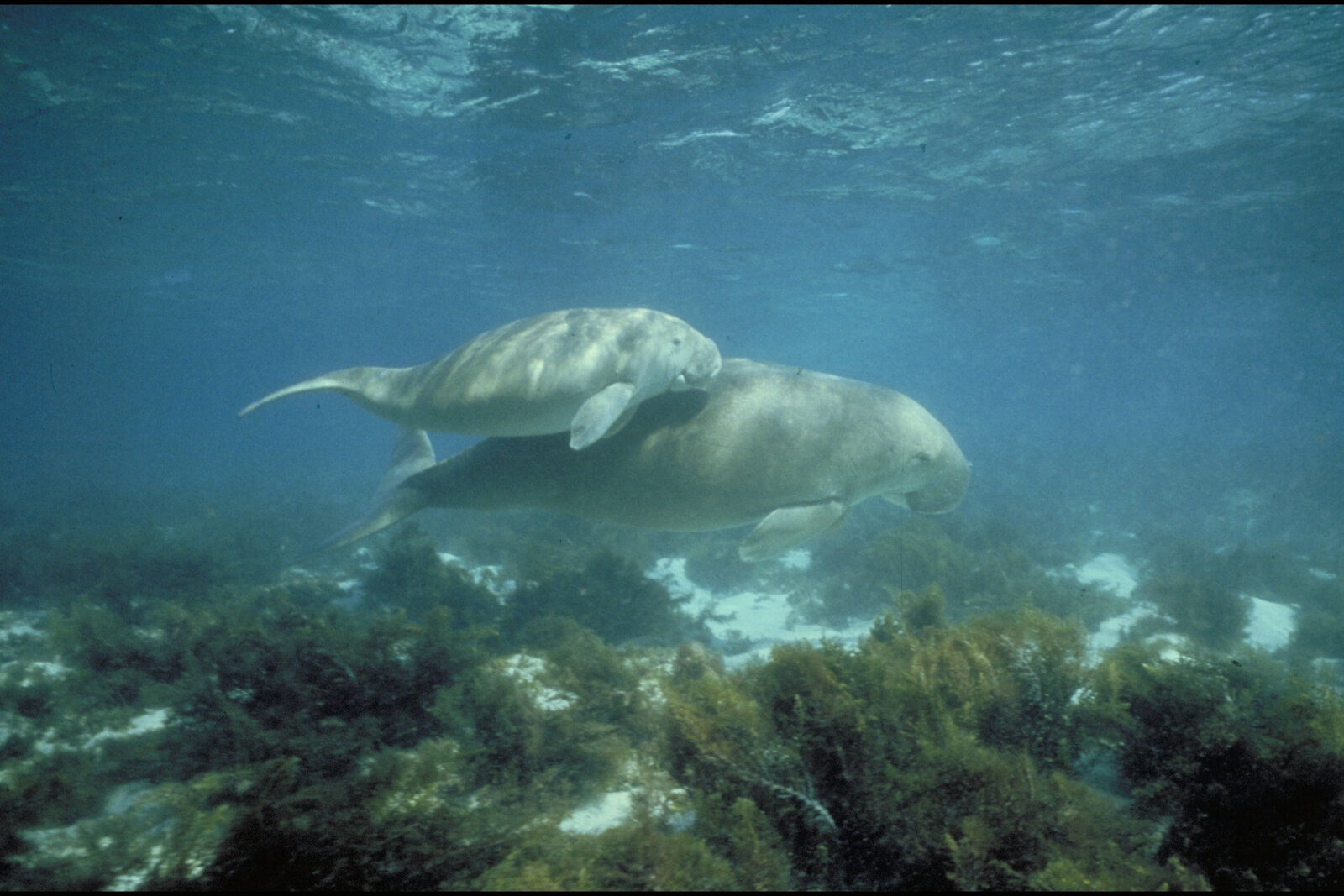
Dugongs

Sirenia is an order of fully aquatic, herbivorous mammals that inhabit rivers, estuaries, coastal marine waters, swamps, and marine wetlands. All four species are endangered.

- Family: Dugongidae
  - Genus: Dugong
    - Dugong, D. dugon VU presence uncertain, possible vagrant

== Order: Rodentia (rodents) ==
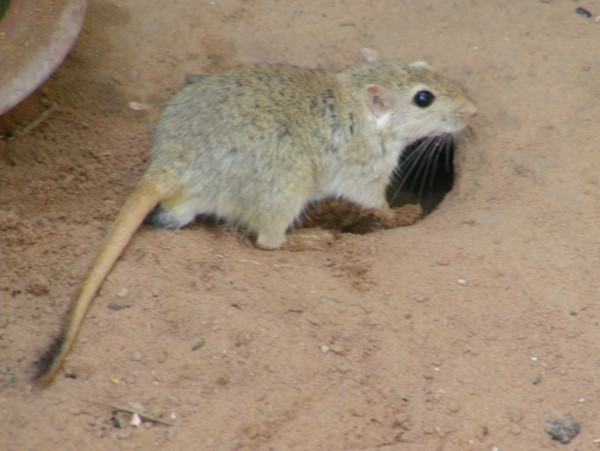
Indian desert jird

Rodents make up the largest order of mammals, with over 40% of mammalian species. They have two incisors in the upper and lower jaw which grow continually and must be kept short by gnawing.

- Suborder: Hystricomorpha
  - Family: Hystricidae
    - Genus: Hystrix
      - Indian crested porcupine, H. indica LC
- Suborder: Sciurognathi
  - Family: Sciuridae (squirrels)
    - Subfamily: Sciurinae
      - Tribe: Sciurini
        - Genus: Sciurus
          - Caucasian squirrel, S. anomalus LC
    - Subfamily: Callosciurinae
      - Genus: Funambulus
        - Northern palm squirrel, Funambulus pennantii LC
    - Subfamily: Xerinae
      - Tribe: Xerini
        - Genus: Spermophilopsis
          - Long-clawed ground squirrel, Spermophilopsis leptodactylus LC
      - Tribe: Marmotini
        - Genus: Spermophilus
          - Yellow ground squirrel, S. fulvus LC
          - Asia Minor ground squirrel, S. xanthoprymnus NT
  - Family: Gliridae (dormice)
    - Subfamily: Leithiinae
      - Genus: Dryomys
        - Forest dormouse, Dryomys nitedula LC
      - Genus: Myomimus
        - Masked mouse-tailed dormouse, Myomimus personatus DD
        - Setzer's mouse-tailed dormouse, Myomimus setzeri DD
    - Subfamily: Glirinae
      - Genus: Glis
        - Iranian edible dormouse, Glis persicus NE
  - Family: Dipodidae (jerboas)
    - Subfamily: Allactaginae
      - Genus: Allactaga
        - Small five-toed jerboa, Allactaga elater LC
        - Euphrates jerboa, Allactaga euphratica LC
        - Iranian jerboa, Allactaga firouzi DD
        - Hotson's jerboa, Allactaga hotsoni LC
        - Williams' jerboa, Allactaga williamsi LC
        - Tousi jerboa, Allactaga toussi
      - Genus: Pygeretmus
        - Dwarf fat-tailed jerboa, Pygeretmus pumilio LC
    - Subfamily: Dipodinae
      - Genus: Dipus
        - Northern three-toed jerboa, Dipus sagitta LC
      - Genus: Jaculus
        - Blanford's jerboa, Jaculus blanfordi LC
        - Lesser Egyptian jerboa, Jaculus jaculus LC
        - Thaler three-toed jerboa, Jaculus thaleri
  - Family: Spalacidae
    - Genus: Spalax
      - Lesser mole rat, Spalax leucodon LC
  - Family: Calomyscidae
    - Genus: Calomyscus
      - Zagros Mountains mouse-like hamster, Calomyscus bailwardi LC
      - Afghan mouse-like hamster, Calomyscus mystax LC
      - Urar mouse-like hamster, Calomyscus urartensis LC
      - Goodwin's mouse-like hamster, Calomyscus elburzensis LC
      - Noble mouse-like hamster, Calomyscus grandis
  - Family: Cricetidae
    - Subfamily: Cricetinae
      - Genus: Cricetulus
        - Grey dwarf hamster, Cricetulus migratorius LC
      - Genus: Mesocricetus
        - Turkish hamster, Mesocricetus brandti LC
        - Golden hamster, Mesocricetus auratus LC
    - Subfamily: Arvicolinae
      - Genus: Arvicola
        - European water vole, A. amphibius LC
      - Genus: Blanfordimys
        - Afghan vole, Blanfordimys afghanus LC
      - Genus: Chionomys
        - European snow vole, Chionomys nivalis
      - Genus: Ellobius
        - Northern mole vole, Ellobius talpinus LC
        - Southern mole vole, Ellobius fuscocapillus LC
        - Transcaucasian mole vole, Ellobius lutescens LC
      - Genus: Microtus
        - Günther's vole, Microtus guentheri LC
        - Persian vole, Microtus irani LC
        - Baluchistan vole, Microtus kermanensis EN
        - Altai vole, Microtus obscurus LC
        - Social vole, Microtus socialis LC
        - Transcaspian vole, Microtus transcaspicus LC
        - European pine vole, Microtus subterraneus LC
        - Common vole, Microtus arvalis LC
        - Major's pine vole, Microtus majori LC
        - Sibling vole, Microtus levis
        - Qazvin vole, Microtus qazvinensis
        - Paradox vole, Microtus paradoxus
        - Schelkovnikov's pine vole, Microtus schelkovnikovi
        - Daghestan pine vole, Microtus daghestanicus
  - Family: Muridae (mice, rats, voles, gerbils, hamsters, etc.)
    - Subfamily: Deomyinae
      - Genus: Acomys
        - Cairo spiny mouse, Acomys cahirinus LC
        - Eastern spiny mouse, Acomys dimidiatus
    - Subfamily: Gerbillinae
      - Genus: Gerbillus
        - Swarthy gerbil, Gerbillus aquilus LC
        - Cheesman's gerbil, Gerbillus cheesmani LC
        - Harrison's gerbil, Gerbillus mesopotamiae LC
        - Balochistan gerbil, Gerbillus nanus LC
        - Pygmy gerbil, Gerbillus henleyi
      - Genus: Meriones
        - Sundevall's jird, Meriones crassus LC
        - Indian desert jird, Meriones hurrianae LC
        - Libyan jird, Meriones libycus LC
        - Mid-day jird, Meriones meridianus LC
        - Persian jird, Meriones persicus LC
        - Tristram's jird, Meriones tristrami LC
        - Vinogradov's jird, Meriones vinogradovi LC
        - Zarudny's jird, Meriones zarudnyi EN
        - Dahl's jird, Meriones dahli
      - Genus: Rhombomys
        - Great gerbil, Rhombomys opimus LC
      - Genus: Tatera
        - Indian gerbil, Tatera indica LC
    - Subfamily: Murinae
      - Genus: Apodemus
        - Persian field mouse, Apodemus arianus LC
        - Yellow-breasted field mouse, Apodemus fulvipectus LC
        - Broad-toothed field mouse, Apodemus mystacinus LC
        - Black Sea field mouse, Apodemus ponticus LC
        - Ward's field mouse, Apodemus wardi LC
        - Hyrcanian field mouse, Apodemus hyrcanicus
        - Yellow-necked field mouse, Apodemus flavicollis
        - Ural field mouse, Apodemus uralensis
        - Steppe field mouse, Apodemus witherbyi
        - Apodemus avicennicus
      - Genus: Golunda
        - Indian bush rat, Golunda ellioti LC
      - Genus: Mus
        - Macedonian mouse, Mus macedonicus LC
        - House mouse, M. musculus LC
      - Genus: Nesokia
        - Short-tailed bandicoot rat, Nesokia indica LC
      - Genus: Rattus
        - Brown rat, R. norvegicus LC introduced
        - Black rat, R. rattus LC introduced
        - Turkestan rat, R. turkestanicus LC
  - Family: Myocastoridae
      - Genus: Myocastor
        - Coypu, Myocastor coypus

== Order: Lagomorpha ==
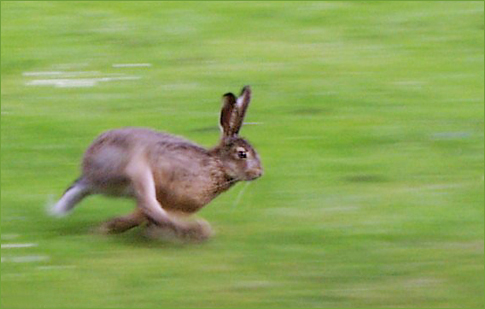
European hare

The lagomorphs comprise the families Leporidae and Ochotonidae. Though members can resemble rodents, and were classified as a superfamily in that order until the early 20th century, they have since been considered a separate order. They differ from rodents in a number of physical characteristics, such as having four incisors in the upper jaw rather than two.

- Family: Leporidae
  - Genus: Lepus
    - Cape hare, L. capensis LC
    - European hare, L. europaeus LC
    - Tolai hare, L. tolai LC
- Family: Ochotonidae
  - Genus: Ochotona
    - Afghan pika, O. rufescens LC

== Order: Erinaceomorpha (hedgehogs and gymnures) ==
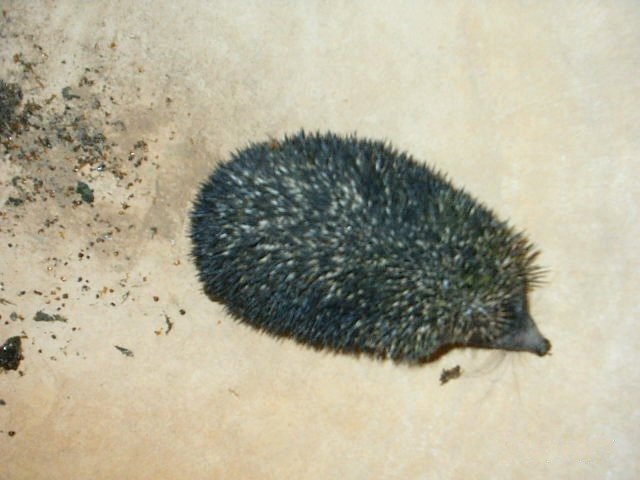
Brandt's hedgehog

The order Erinaceomorpha contains a single family, Erinaceidae, which comprise the hedgehogs and gymnures. The hedgehogs are easily recognised by their spines while gymnures look more like large rats.

- Family: Erinaceidae (hedgehogs)
  - Subfamily: Erinaceinae
    - Genus: Erinaceus
      - Southern white-breasted hedgehog, E. concolor LC
    - Genus: Hemiechinus
      - Long-eared hedgehog, H. auritus LC
    - Genus: Paraechinus
      - Desert hedgehog, P. aethiopicus LC
      - Brandt's hedgehog, P. hypomelas LC

== Order: Soricomorpha (shrews, moles, and solenodons) ==
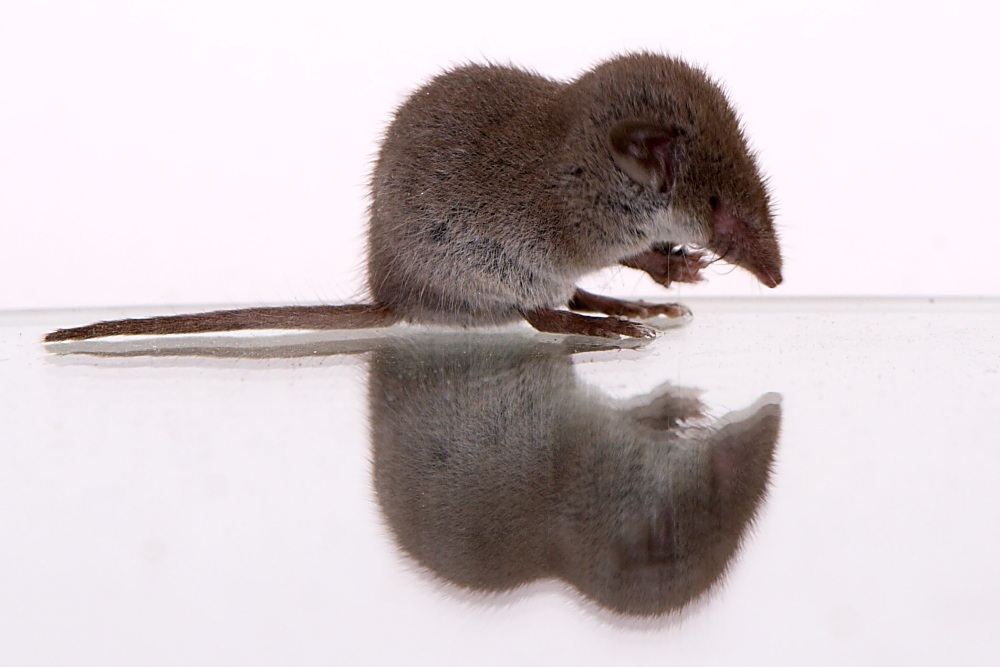
Lesser white-toothed shrew

The "shrew-forms" are insectivorous mammals. The shrews and solenodons closely resemble mice while the moles are stout-bodied burrowers.

- Family: Soricidae (shrews)
  - Subfamily: Crocidurinae
    - Genus: Crocidura
      - Caspian shrew, C. caspica DD
      - Gmelin's white-toothed shrew, C. gmelini LC
      - Bicolored shrew, C. leucodon LC
      - Katinka's shrew, C. katinka DD presence uncertain
      - Lesser white-toothed shrew, C. suaveolens LC
      - Iranian shrew, C. susiana EN
      - Zarudny's shrew, C. zarudnyi LC
  - Subfamily: Soricinae
    - Tribe: Nectogalini
      - Genus: Neomys
      - Mediterranean water shrew, N. anomalus
        - Transcaucasian water shrew, N. schelkovnikovi LC
    - Tribe: Soricini
      - Genus: Sorex
        - Caucasian pygmy shrew, S. volnuchini LC
      - Genus: Suncus
      - Asian house shrew, S. murinus introduced, presence uncertain
        - Pygmy white-toothed shrew, S. etruscus
- Family: Talpidae (moles)
  - Subfamily: Talpinae
    - Tribe: Talpini
      - Genus: Talpa
        - Père David's mole, T. davidiana DD
        - Levant mole, T. levantis

== Order: Chiroptera (bats) ==
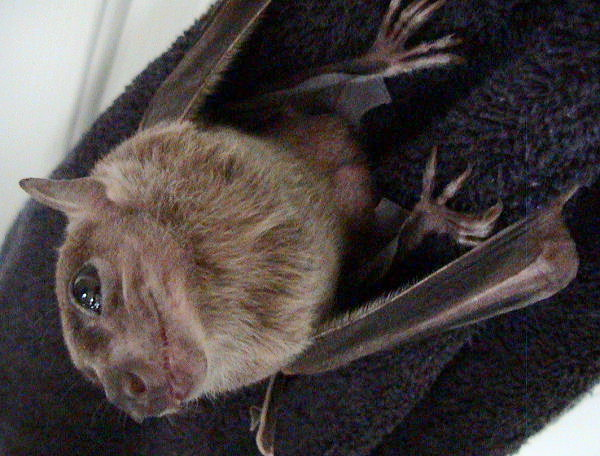
Egyptian fruit bat

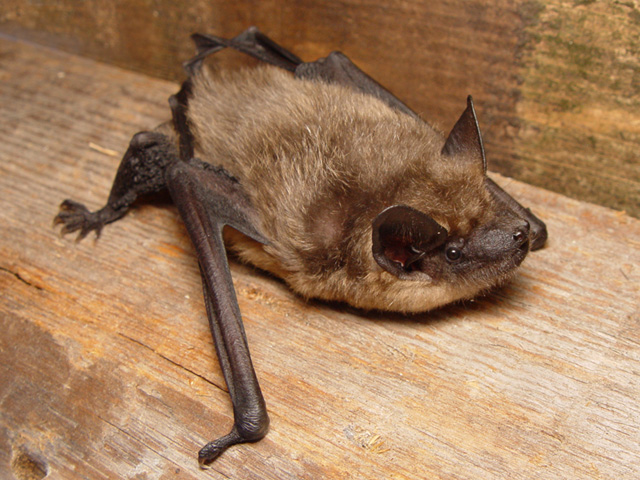
Serotine bat

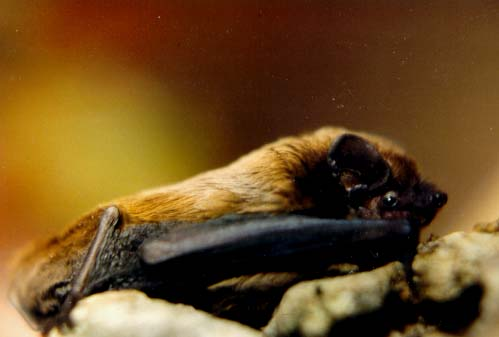
Lesser noctule

The bats' most distinguishing feature is that their forelimbs are developed as wings, making them the only mammals capable of flight. Bat species account for about 20% of all mammals.

- Family: Pteropodidae (flying foxes, Old World fruit bats)
  - Subfamily: Pteropodinae
    - Genus: Rousettus
      - Egyptian fruit bat, R. aegyptiacus LC
- Family: Vespertilionidae
  - Subfamily: Myotinae
    - Genus: Myotis
      - Steppe whiskered bat, M. aurascens LC
      - Long-fingered bat, M. capaccinii VU
      - Bechstein's bat, M. bechsteini NT
      - Lesser mouse-eared bat, M. blythii LC
      - Geoffroy's bat, M. emarginatus LC
      - Whiskered bat, M. mystacinus LC
      - Natterer's bat, M. nattereri LC
      - Nepal myotis, M. nipalensis LC
      - Schaub's myotis, M. schaubi DD
  - Subfamily: Vespertilioninae
    - Genus: Barbastella
      - Western barbastelle, B. barbastellus NT
      - Eastern barbastelle, B. leucomelas LC
      - Barbastella caspica
    - Genus: Otonycteris
      - Desert long-eared bat, O. hemprichii LC
      - Turkestani long-eared bat, O. leucophaea DD
    - Genus: Eptesicus
      - E. anatolicus LC
      - Bobrinski's serotine, E. bobrinskoi LC
      - Botta's serotine, E. bottae LC
      - Northern bat, E. nilssoni LC
      - E. ognevi LC
      - E. pachyomus LC
      - Serotine bat, E. serotinus LC
      - Eptesicus pachyomus
    - Genus: Hypsugo
      - Arabian pipistrelle, H. arabicus LC
      - Savi's pipistrelle, H. savii LC
    - Genus: Nyctalus
      - Greater noctule bat, N. lasiopterus NT
      - Lesser noctule, N. leisleri LC
      - Common noctule, N. noctula LC
    - Genus: Pipistrellus
      - Kuhl's pipistrelle, P. kuhlii LC
      - Common pipistrelle, P. pipistrellus LC
      - Soprano pipistrelle, P. pygmaeus LC
    - Genus: Plecotus
      - Brown long-eared bat, P. auritus LC
      - Grey long-eared bat, P. austriacus LC
      - Mountain long-eared bat, P. macrobullaris LC
      - P. strelkovi LC
    - Genus: Vespertilio
      - Parti-coloured bat, V. murinus LC
    - Genus: Rhyneptesicus
      - Sind bat, R. nasutus LC
- Family: Rhinopomatidae
  - Genus: Rhinopoma
    - Lesser mouse-tailed bat, R. hardwickei LC
    - Greater mouse-tailed bat, R. microphyllum LC
    - Small mouse-tailed bat, R. muscatellum LC
- Family: Emballonuridae
  - Genus: Taphozous
    - Naked-rumped tomb bat, T. nudiventris LC
    - Egyptian tomb bat, T. perforatus LC
- Family: Rhinolophidae
  - Subfamily: Rhinolophinae
    - Genus: Rhinolophus
      - Blasius's horseshoe bat, R. blasii LC
      - Mediterranean horseshoe bat, R. euryale NT
      - Bokhara horseshoe bat, R. bocharicus LC
      - Greater horseshoe bat, R. ferrumequinum LC
      - Lesser horseshoe bat, R. hipposideros LC
      - Mehely's horseshoe bat, R. mehelyi VU
  - Subfamily: Hipposiderinae
    - Genus: Asellia
      - Trident leaf-nosed bat, A. tridens LC
    - Genus: Triaenops
      - Persian trident bat, T. persicus LC
- Family: Molossidae
  - Genus: Tadarida
    - Egyptian free-tailed bat, T. aegyptiaca LC
    - European free-tailed bat, T. teniotis LC

== Order: Cetacea (whales) ==
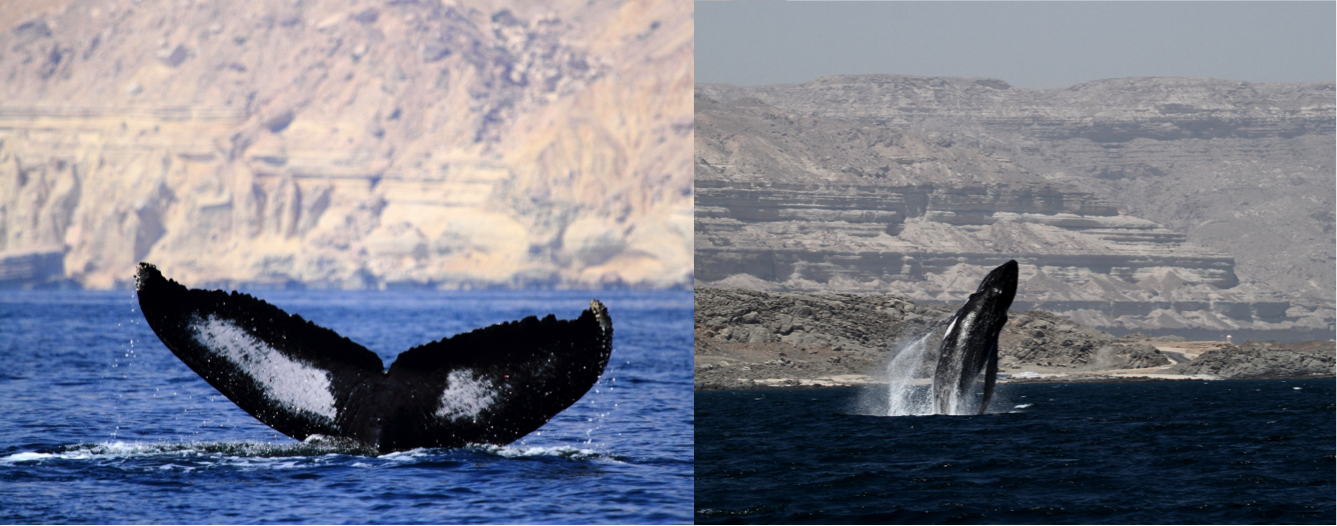
Arabian humpback whales

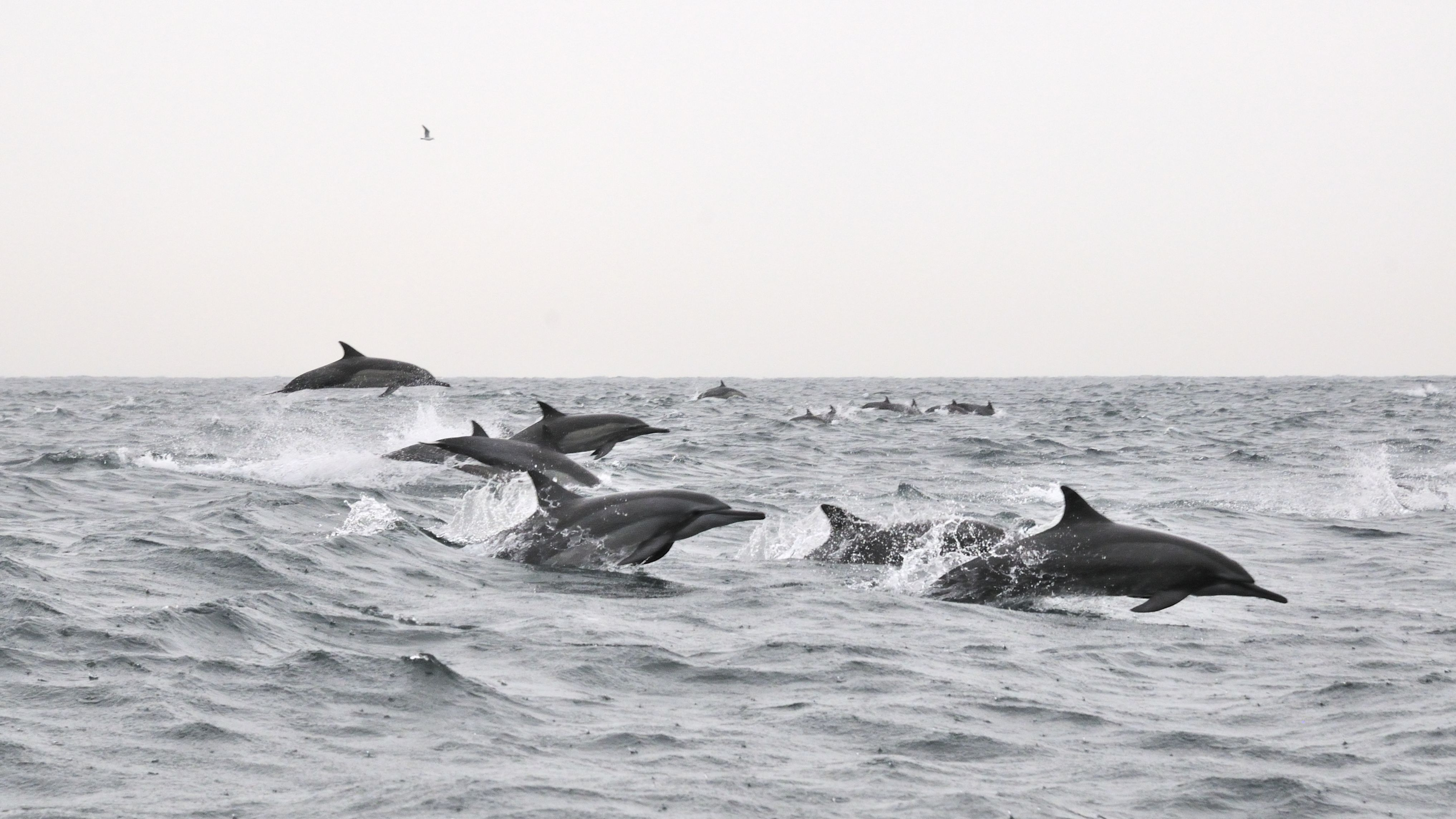
Spinner dolphins in Gulf of Oman

The order Cetacea includes whales, dolphins and porpoises. They are the mammals most fully adapted to aquatic life with a spindle-shaped nearly hairless body, protected by a thick layer of blubber, and forelimbs and tail modified to provide propulsion underwater.

More than 14 species have been recorded within Iran's exclusive economic zone.

- Suborder: Mysticeti
  - Family: Balaenopteridae
    - Subfamily: Balaenopterinae
      - Genus: Balaenoptera
        - Sei whale, B. borealis EN
        - Bryde's whale, B. edeni DD
        - Blue whale, B. musculus EN
        - Omura's whale, B. omurai DD
        - Fin whale, B. physalus EN
        - Common minke whale, B. acutorostrata
      - Genus: Globicephala
        - Short-finned pilot whale, G. macrorhynchus
      - Genus: Kogia
        - Dwarf sperm whale, K. sima
      - Genus: Orcinus
        - Killer whale, O. orca
      - Genus: Physeter
        - Sperm whale, P. macrocephalus
      - Genus: Ziphius
        - Cuvier's beaked whale, Z. cavirostris
    - Subfamily: Megapterinae
      - Genus: Megaptera
        - Humpback whale, Megaptera novaeangliae CR (Arabian Sea population)
- Suborder: Odontoceti
  - Superfamily: Platanistoidea
    - Family: Phocoenidae
      - Genus: Neophocaena
        - Finless porpoise, Neophocaena phocaenoides DD
    - Family: Delphinidae (marine dolphins)
      - Genus: Sousa
        - Indo-Pacific humpback dolphin, Sousa chinensis DD
      - Genus: Steno
        - Rough-toothed dolphin, Steno bredanensis DD
      - Genus: Tursiops
        - Bottlenose dolphin, Tursiops aduncus DD
      - Genus: Stenella
        - Spinner dolphin, Stenella longirostris DD
      - Genus: Delphinus
        - Long-beaked common dolphin, Delphinus capensis DD
      - Genus: Lagenodelphis
        - Fraser's dolphin, Lagenodelphis hosei DD
      - Genus: Grampus
        - Risso's dolphin, Grampus griseus DD
      - Genus: Feresa
        - Pygmy killer whale, Feresa attenuata DD
      - Genus: Peponocephala
        - Melon-headed whale, Peponocephala electra DD
      - Genus: Pseudorca
        - False killer whale, Pseudorca crassidens DD

== Order: Carnivora (carnivorans) ==
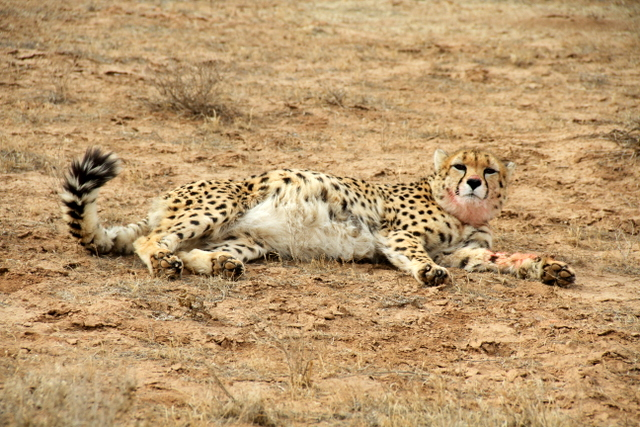
Asiatic cheetah

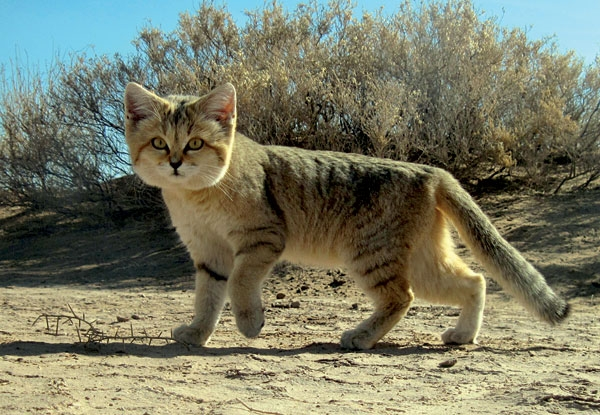
Sand cat

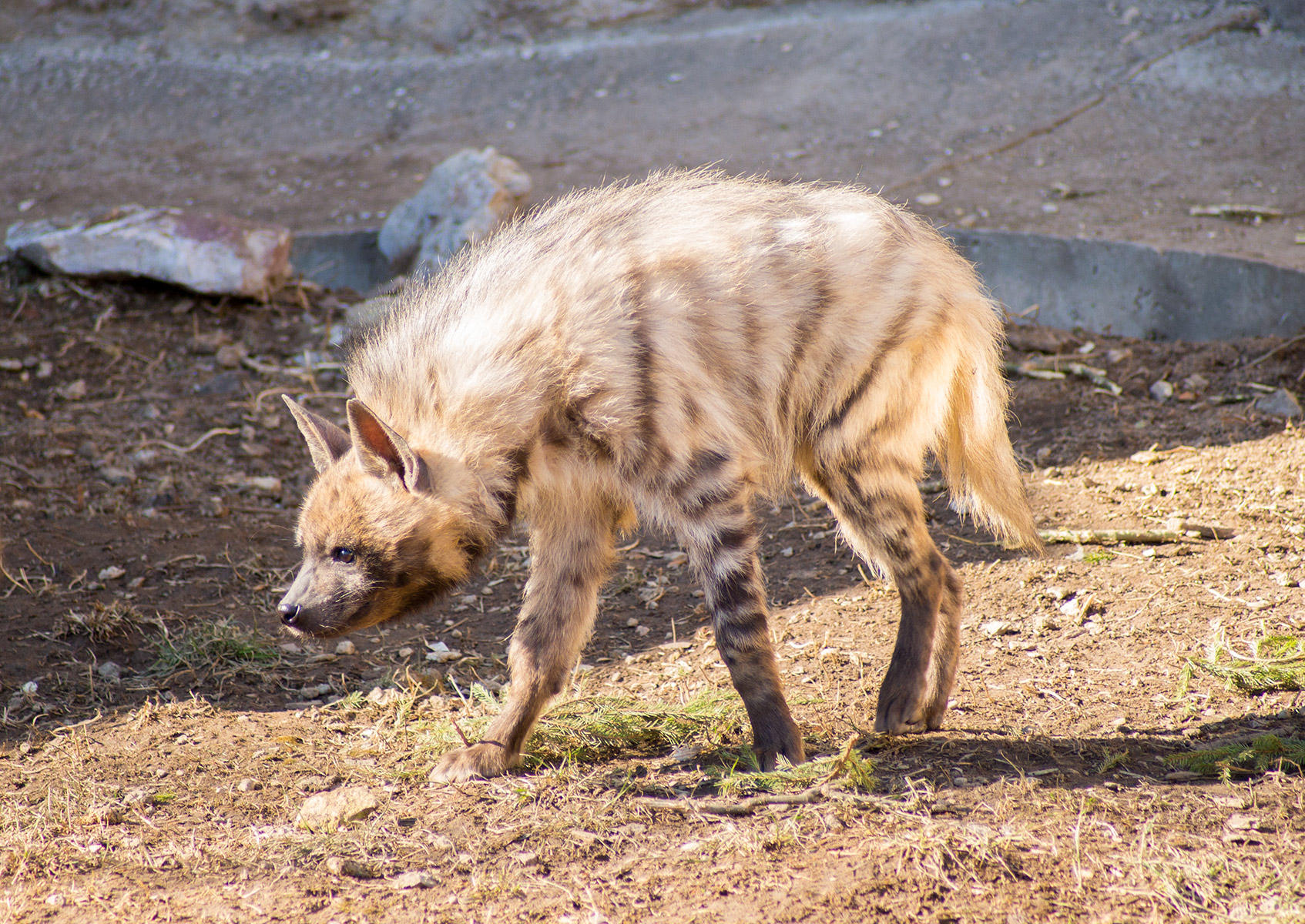
Striped hyena

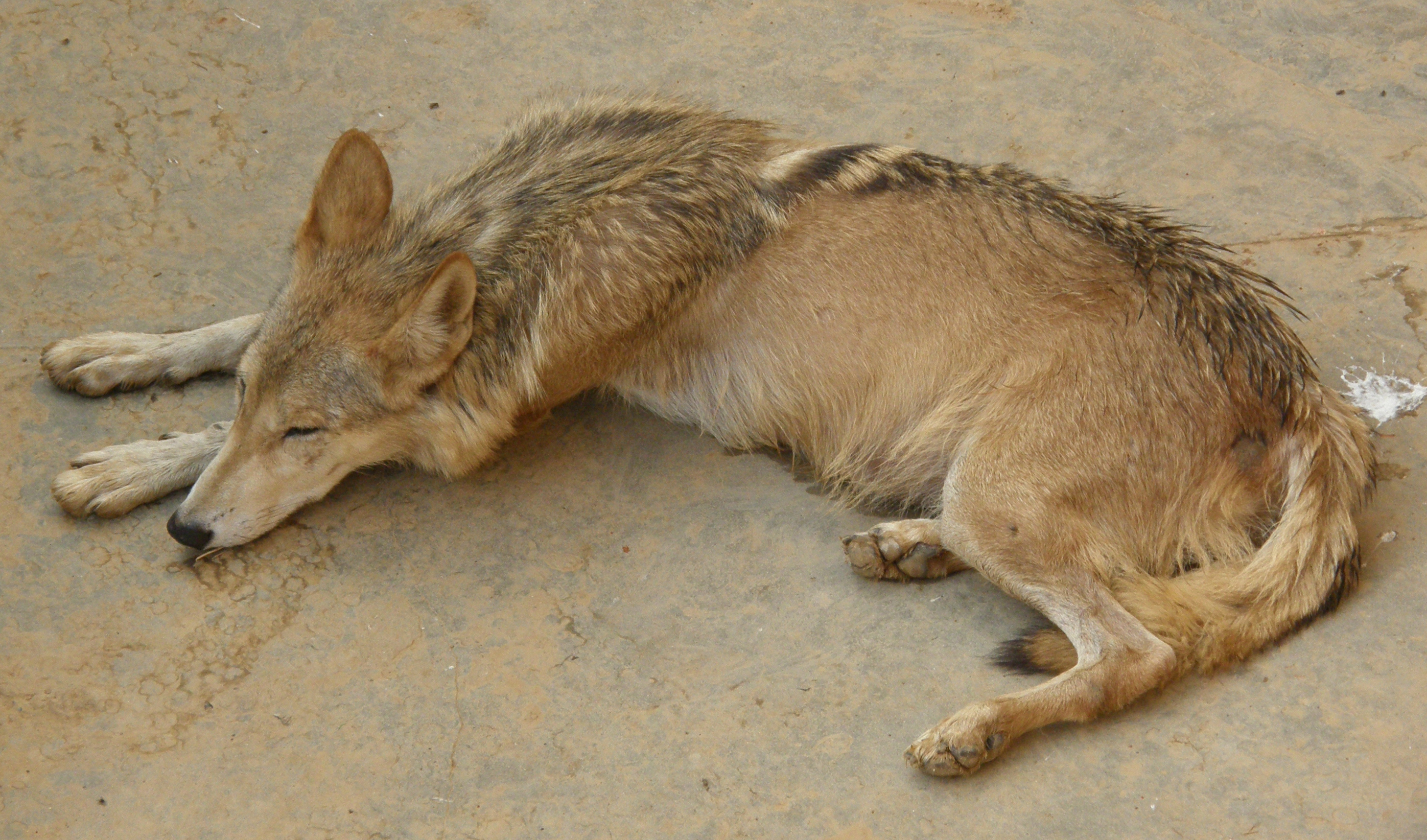
Indian wolf

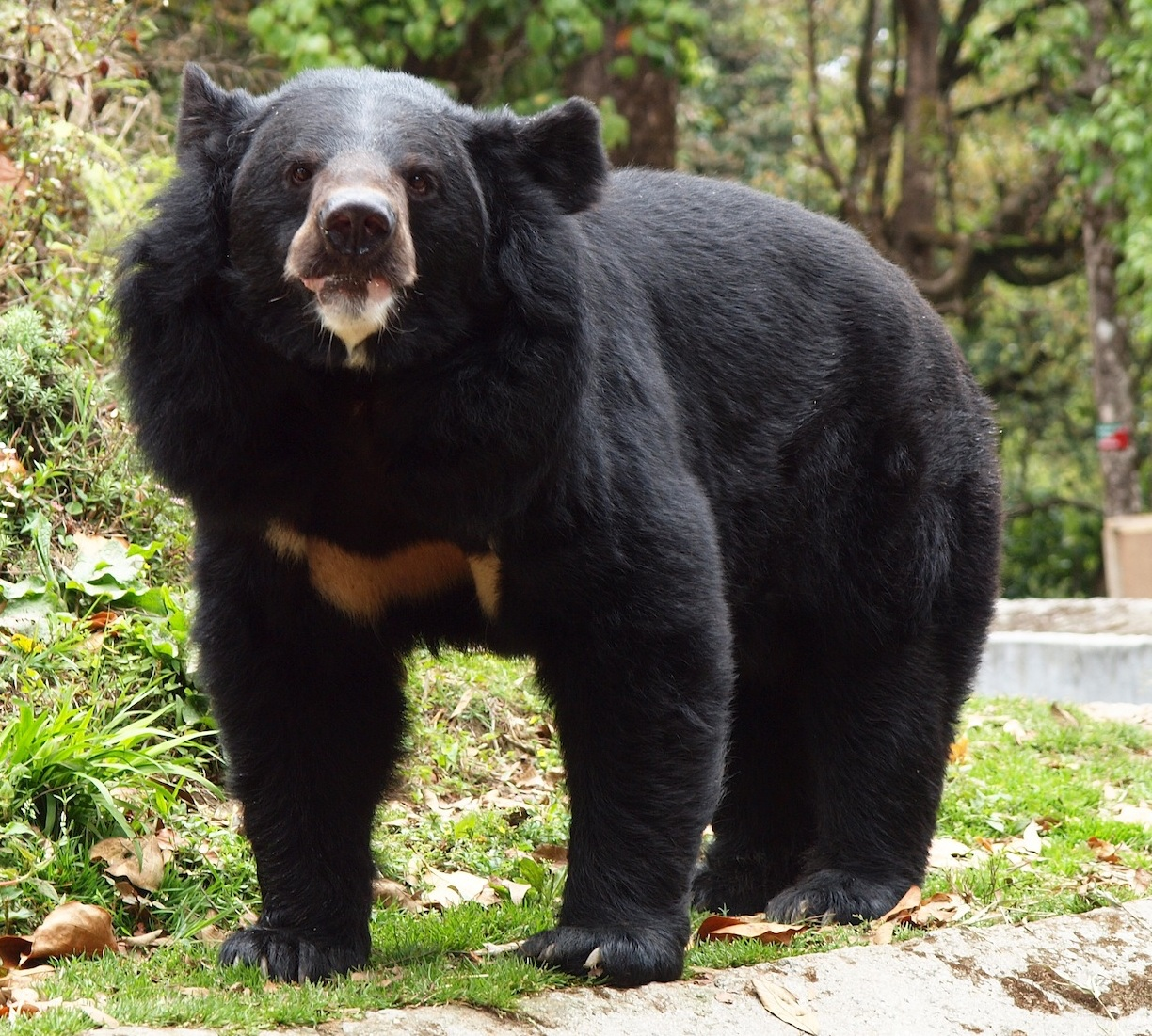
Asiatic black bear

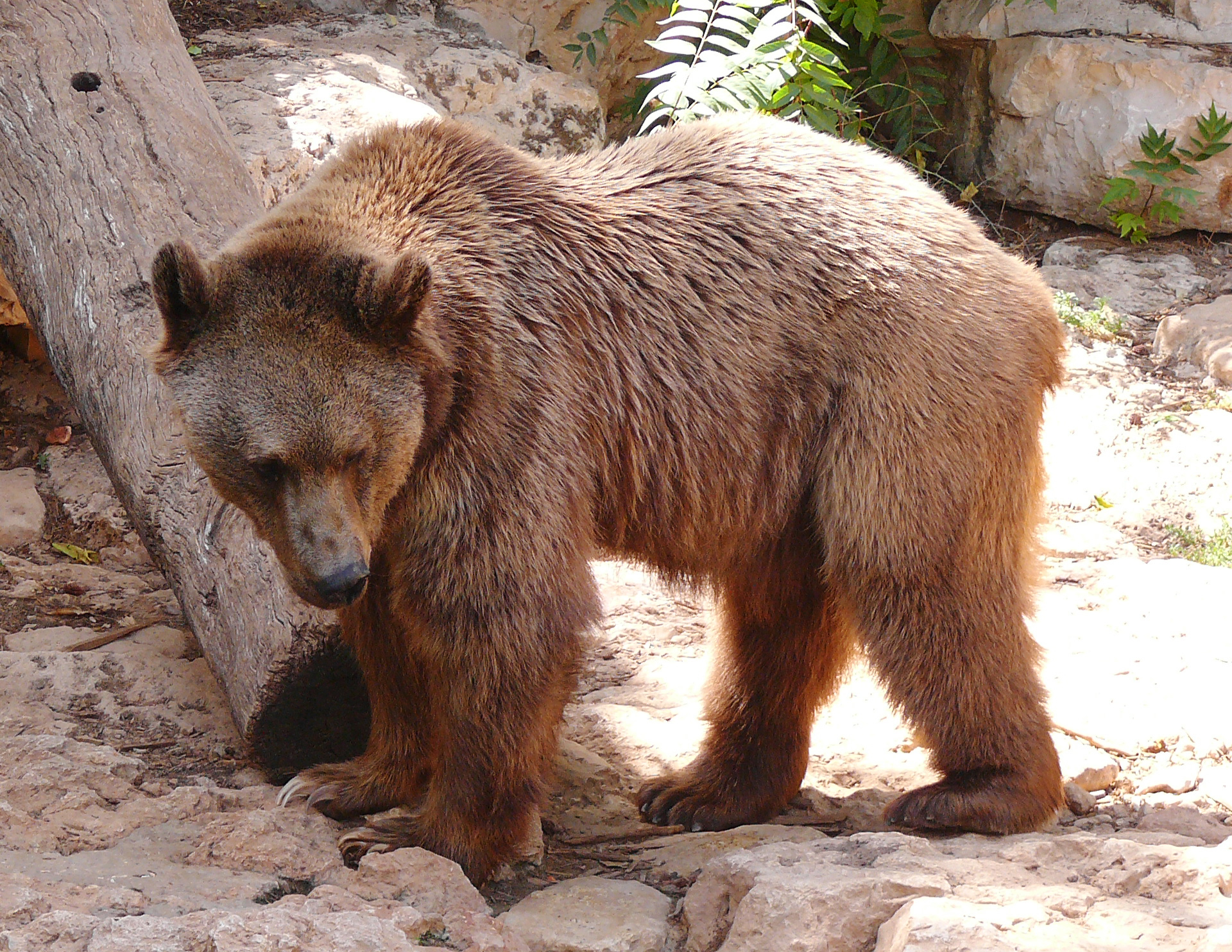
Syrian brown bear

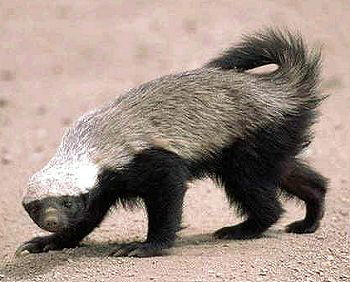
Honey badger

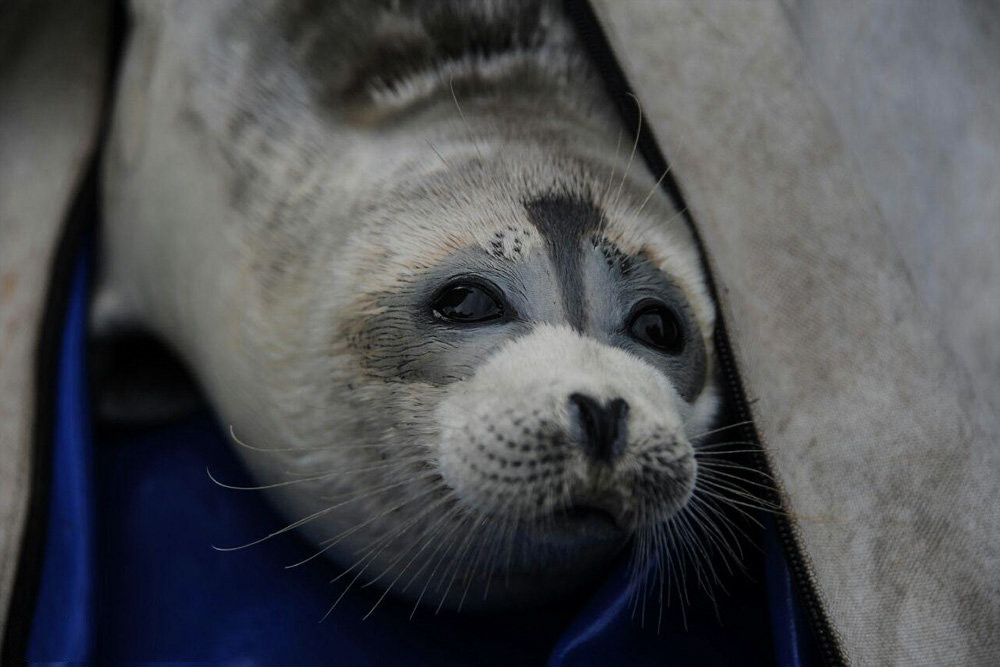
Caspian seal

There are over 260 species of carnivorans, the majority of which feed primarily on meat. They have a characteristic skull shape and dentition.

- Suborder: Feliformia
  - Family: Felidae
    - Subfamily: Felinae
      - Genus: Acinonyx
        - Cheetah, A. jubatus
          - Asiatic cheetah, A. j. venaticus CR
      - Genus: Caracal
        - Caracal, C. caracal LC
      - Genus: Felis
        - Jungle cat, F. chaus LC
        - African wildcat, F. lybica LC
          - Asiatic wildcat, F. l. ornata
        - Sand cat, F. margarita LC
          - Turkestan sand cat, F. m. thinobia
      - Genus: Lynx
        - Eurasian lynx, L. lynx LC
      - Genus: Otocolobus
        - Pallas's cat, O. manul LC
    - Subfamily: Pantherinae
      - Genus: Panthera
        - Leopard, P. pardus VU
          - Panthera pardus tulliana EN
  - Family: Herpestidae (mongooses)
    - Genus: Urva
      - Small Indian mongoose, U. auropunctata LC
      - Indian grey mongoose, U. edwardsii LC
  - Family: Hyaenidae (hyaenas)
    - Genus: Hyaena
      - Striped hyena, H. hyaena NT
- Suborder: Caniformia
  - Family: Canidae
    - Genus: Canis
      - Golden jackal, C. aureus LC
        - Persian jackal, C. a. aureus
      - Gray wolf, C. lupus LC
        - Steppe wolf, C. l. campestris
        - Indian wolf, C. l. pallipes
    - Genus: Vulpes
      - Blanford's fox, V. cana LC
      - Corsac fox, V. corsac LC
      - Rüppell's fox, V. rueppellii LC
      - Red fox, V. vulpes LC
  - Family: Ursidae (bears)
    - Genus: Ursus
      - Brown bear, U. arctos LC
      - Asiatic black bear, U. thibetanus VU
  - Family: Mustelidae (mustelids)
    - Genus: Lutra
      - European otter, L. lutra NT
    - Genus: Martes
      - Beech marten, M. foina LC
      - European pine marten, M. martes LC
    - Genus: Meles
      - Caucasian badger, M. canescens NE
    - Genus: Mellivora
      - Honey badger, M. capensis LC
    - Genus: Mustela
      - Least weasel, M. nivalis LC
    - Genus: Vormela
      - Marbled polecat, V. peregusna VU
  - Family: Phocidae (earless seals)
    - Genus: Pusa
      - Caspian seal, P. caspica EN

== Order: Perissodactyla (odd-toed ungulates) ==
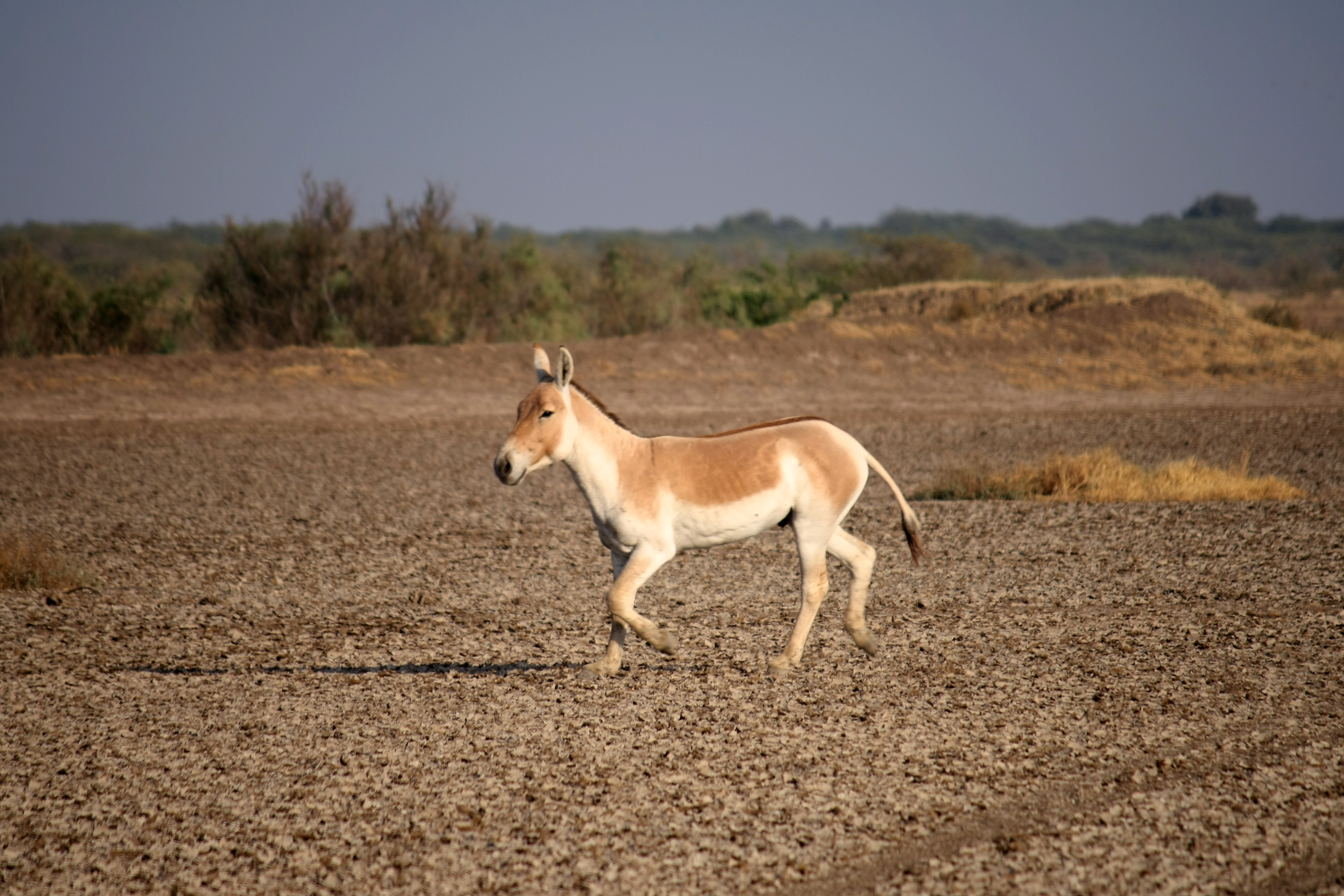
Onager

The odd-toed ungulates are browsing and grazing mammals. They are usually large to very large, and have relatively simple stomachs and a large middle toe.

- Family: Equidae (horses etc.)
  - Genus: Equus
    - Onager, E. hemionus NT
      - Syrian wild ass, E. h. hemippus EX
      - Indian wild ass, E. h. khur NT
      - Persian onager, E. h. onager EN

== Order: Artiodactyla (even-toed ungulates) ==
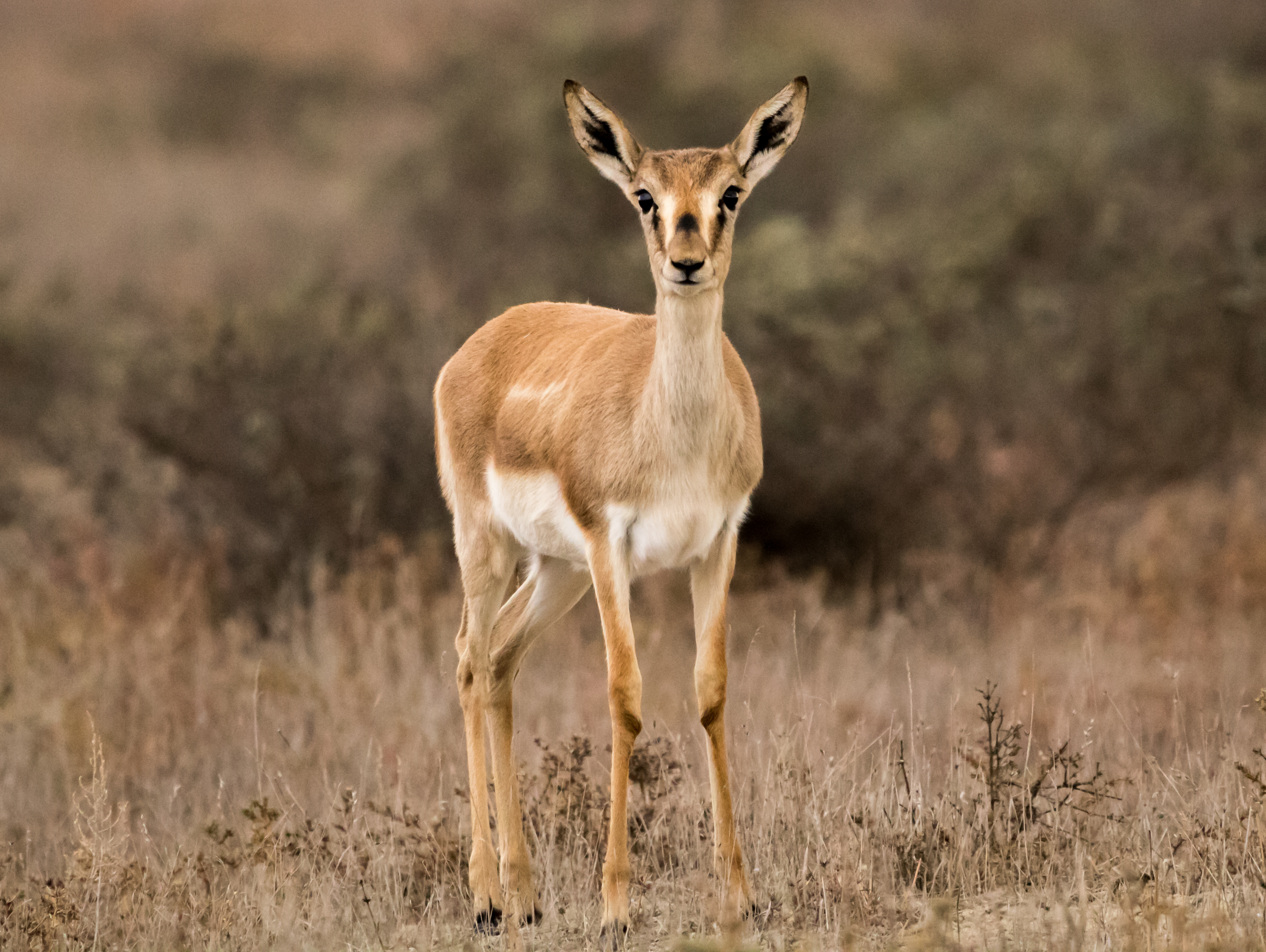
Goitered gazelle

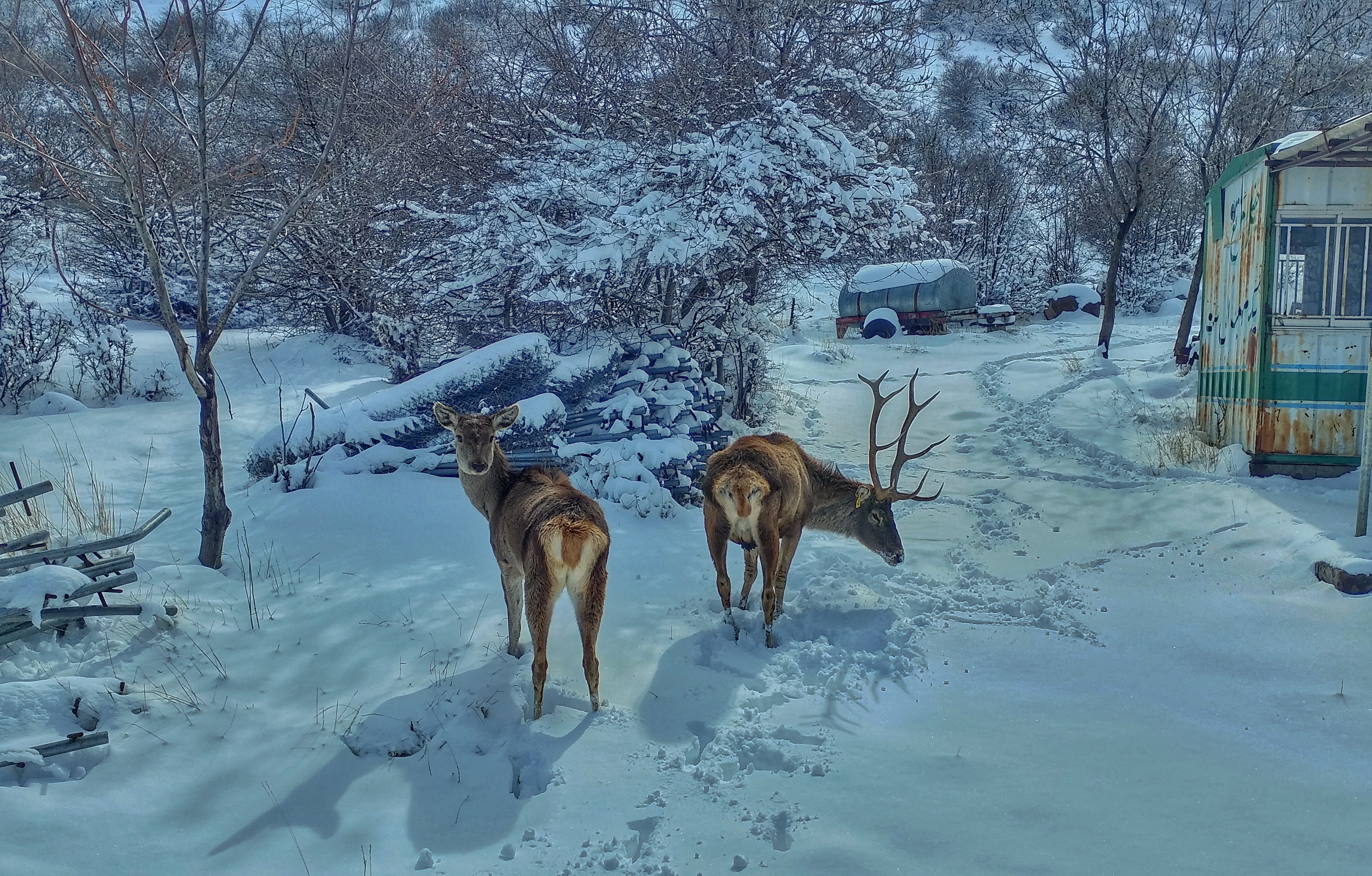
Caspian red deer

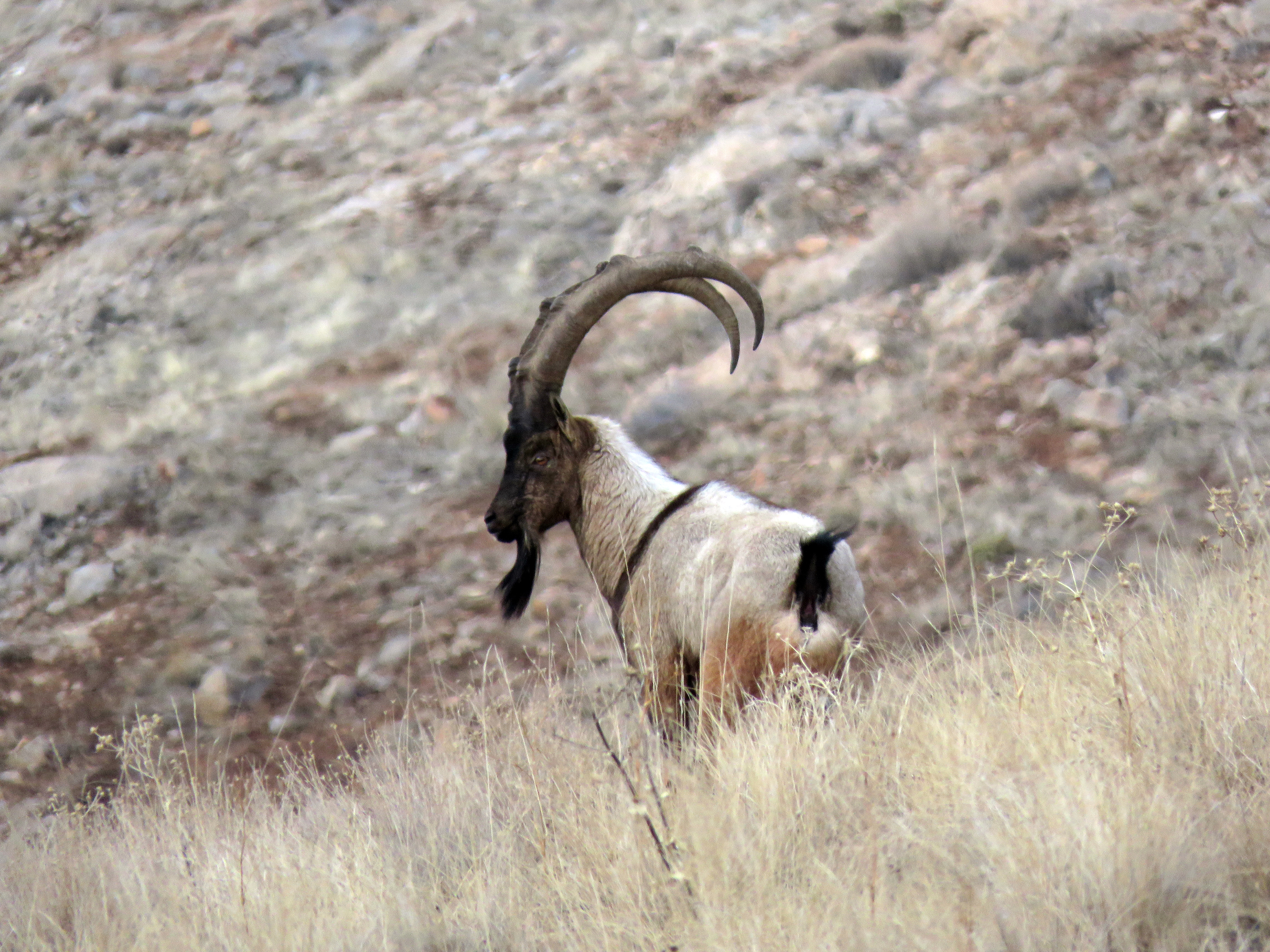
Bezoar ibex

The even-toed ungulates are ungulates whose weight is borne about equally by the third and fourth toes, rather than mostly or entirely by the third as in perissodactyls. There are about 220 artiodactyl species, including many that are of great economic importance to humans.

- Family: Bovidae (cattle, antelope, buffalo, sheep, goats)
  - Subfamily: Antilopinae
    - Genus: Gazella
      - Chinkara, G. bennettii LC
      - Goitered gazelle, G. subgutturosa VU
  - Subfamily: Caprinae
    - Genus: Capra
      - Wild goat, C. aegagrus NT
        - Bezoar ibex, C. a. aegagrus
    - Genus: Ovis
      - Mouflon, O. gmelini NT
        - Armenian mouflon, O. g. gmelini
      - Urial, O. vignei VU
- Family: Cervidae (deer)
  - Subfamily: Cervinae
    - Genus: Cervus
      - Red deer, C. elaphus LC
    - Genus: Dama
      - Persian fallow deer, D. mesopotamica EN
  - Subfamily: Capreolinae
    - Genus: Capreolus
      - European roe deer, C. capreolus LC
- Family: Suidae (pigs)
  - Subfamily: Suinae
    - Genus: Sus
      - Wild boar, S. scrofa LC

== Locally extinct ==
The following species are locally extinct in Iran:

- Eurasian beaver, Castor fiber
- Lion, Panthera leo
- Tiger, Panthera tigris

== See also ==
- List of chordate orders
- Lists of mammals by region
- List of prehistoric mammals
- Mammal classification
- Wildlife of Iran
