= List of mammals of Syria =

This list of mammals of Syria is derived from IUCN Red Lists. The following tags are used to highlight each species' conservation status:

CR	Critically endangered	The species is in imminent risk of extinction in the wild.
EN	Endangered	The species is facing an extremely high risk of extinction in the wild.
VU	Vulnerable	The species is facing a high risk of extinction in the wild.
NT	Near threatened	The species does not meet any of the criteria that would categorise it as risking extinction but it is likely to do so in the future.
LC	Least concern	There are no current identifiable risks to the species.
DD	Data deficient	There is inadequate information to make an assessment of the risks to this species.
EX	Extinct	No reasonable doubt that the last individual has died.
EW	Extinct in the wild	Known only to survive in captivity or as a naturalized populations well outside its previous range.

== Order: Artiodactyla (even-toed ungulates) ==
The even-toed ungulates are ungulates whose weight is borne about equally by the third and fourth toes, rather than mostly or entirely by the third as in perissodactyls. There are about 220 artiodactyl species, including many that are of great economic importance to humans.

- Family: Bovidae (cattle, antelope, sheep, goats)
  - Subfamily: Antilopinae
    - Genus: Bubalus
      - Water buffalo, B. bubalis
    - Genus: Gazella
      - Mountain gazelle, G. gazella EN
      - Arabian sand gazelle, G. marica VU
      - Goitered gazelle, G. subgutturosa VU
  - Subfamily: Caprinae
    - Genus: Capra
      - Nubian ibex, C. nubiana VU reintroduced
- Family: Cervidae (deer)
  - Subfamily: Capreolinae
    - Genus: Capreolus
      - Roe deer, C. capreolus LC

== Order: Carnivora (carnivorans) ==
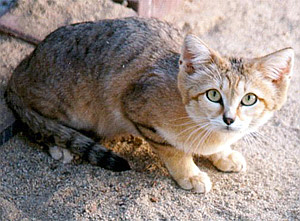
Sand cat

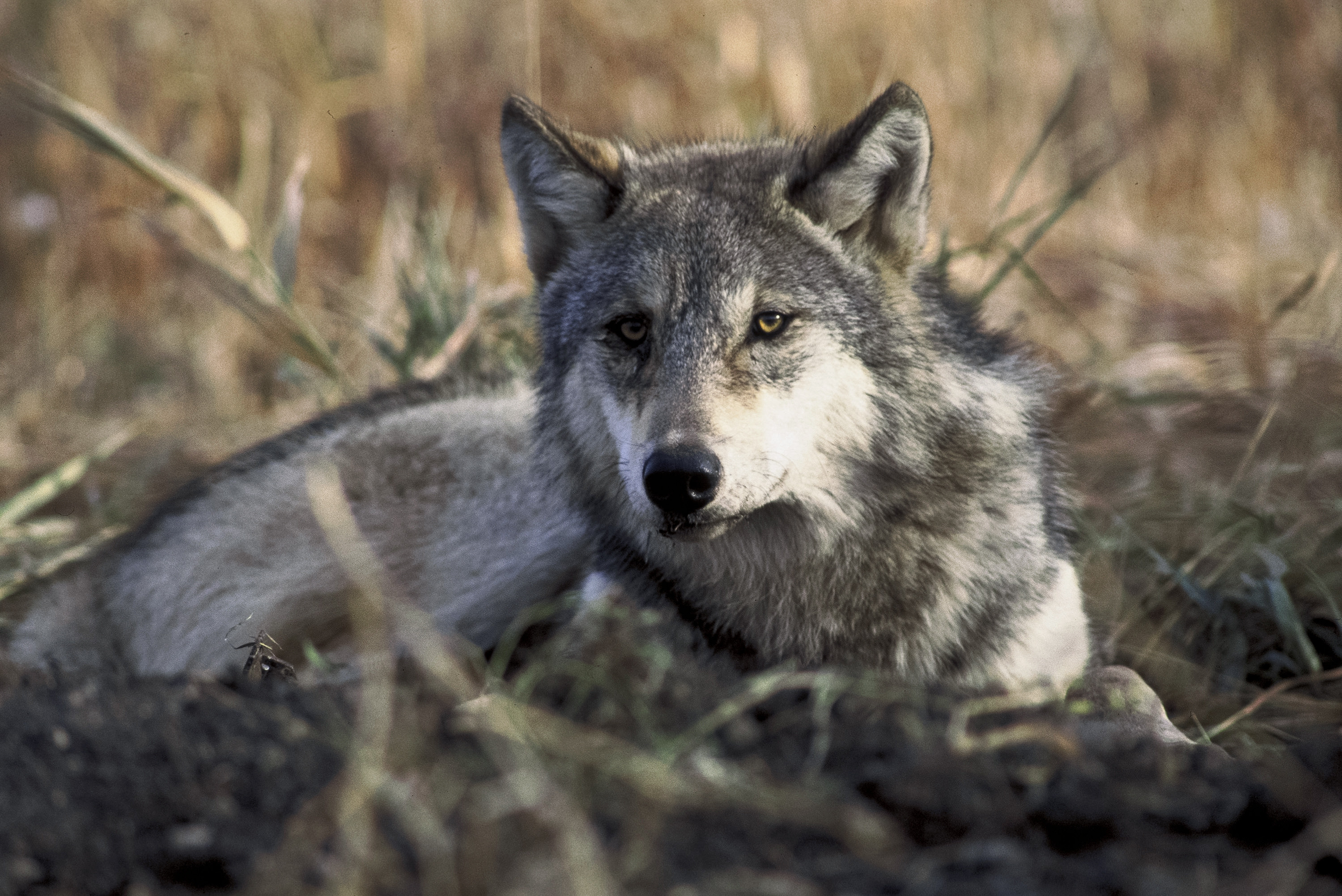
Gray wolf

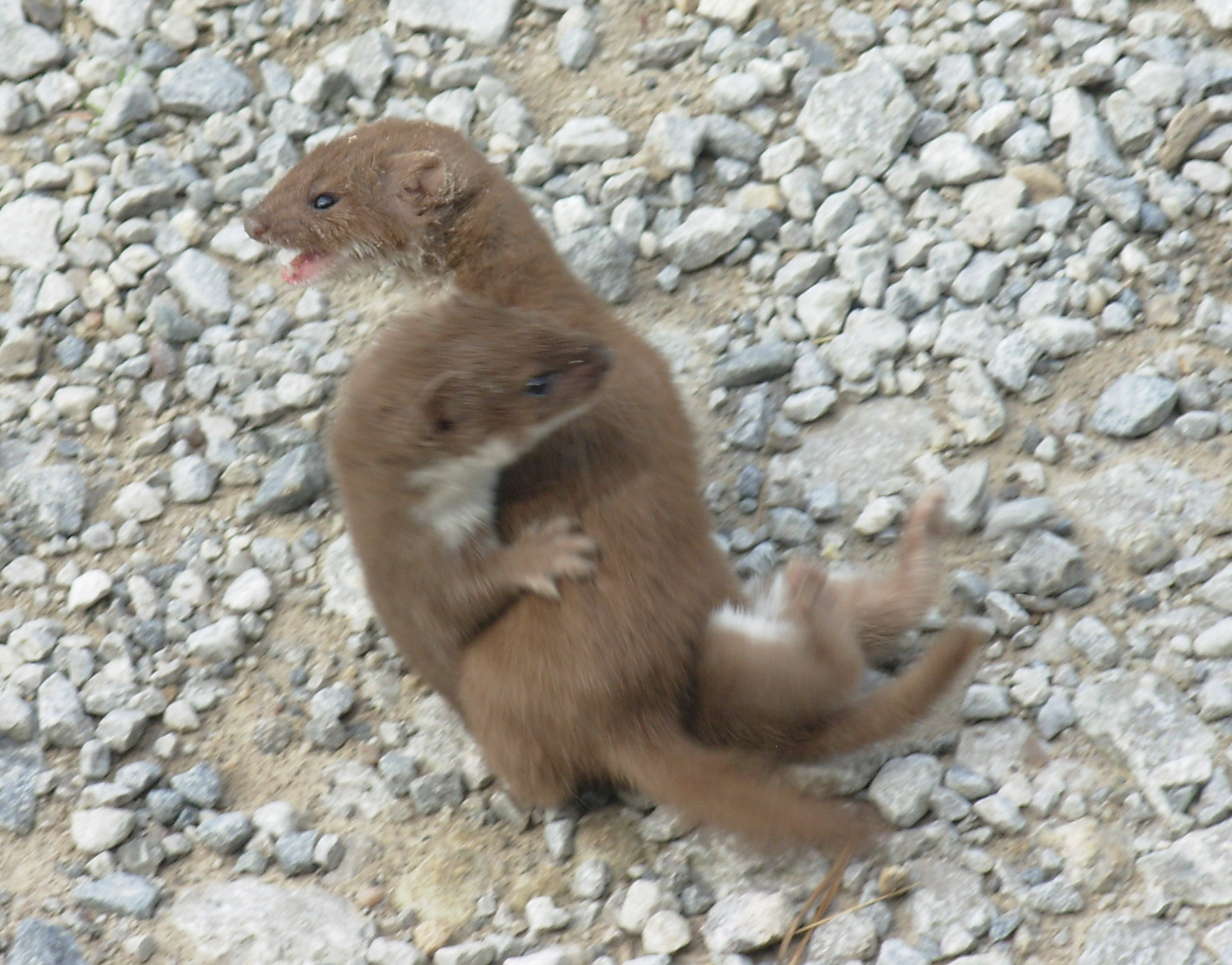
Least weasel

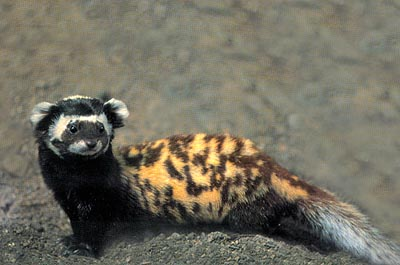
Marbled polecat

There are over 260 species of carnivorans, the majority of which feed primarily on meat. They have a characteristic skull shape and dentition.

- Suborder: Feliformia
  - Family: Felidae (cats)
    - Subfamily: Felinae
      - Genus: Caracal
        - Caracal, C. caracal LC
      - Genus: Felis
        - Jungle cat, F. chaus LC
        - African wildcat, F. lybica LC
          - Asiatic wildcat, F. l. ornata
        - Sand cat, F. margarita LC
  - Family: Herpestidae (mongooses)
    - Genus: Herpestes
      - Egyptian mongoose, H. ichneumon LC
  - Family: Hyaenidae (hyaenas)
    - Genus: Hyaena
      - Striped hyena, H. hyaena NT
- Suborder: Caniformia
  - Family: Canidae (dogs, foxes)
    - Genus: Canis
      - Golden jackal, C. aureus LC
      - Gray wolf, C. lupus LC
        - Arabian wolf, C. l. arabs
        - Indian wolf, C. l. pallipes
    - Genus: Vulpes
      - Rüppell's fox, V. rueppellii LC
      - Red fox, V. vulpes LC
  - Family: Ursidae (bears)
    - Genus: Ursus
      - Brown bear, U. arctos LC
        - Syrian brown bear, U. a. syriacus
  - Family: Mustelidae (mustelids)
    - Genus: Lutra
      - European otter, L. lutra NT
    - Genus: Martes
      - European pine marten, M. martes LC
    - Genus: Meles
      - Caucasian badger, M. canescens NE
    - Genus: Mustela
      - Least weasel, M. nivalis LC
    - Genus: Vormela
      - Marbled polecat, V. peregusna VU
  - Family: Phocidae (earless seals)
    - Genus: Monachus
      - Mediterranean monk seal, M. monachus EN possibly extirpated

== Order: Cetacea (whales) ==
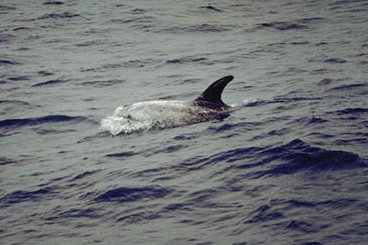
Risso's dolphin

The order Cetacea includes whales, dolphins and porpoises. They are the mammals most fully adapted to aquatic life with a spindle-shaped nearly hairless body, protected by a thick layer of blubber, and forelimbs and tail modified to provide propulsion underwater.

Species listed below also includes species being recorded in Levantine Sea.

- Suborder: Mysticeti
  - Family: Balaenopteridae
    - Genus: Balaenoptera
      - Blue whale, Balaenoptera musculus EN (possible)
      - Fin whale, Balaenoptera physalus EN
      - Common minke whale, Balaenoptera acutorostrata LC
- Subfamily: Megapterinae
  - Genus: Megaptera
    - Humpback whale, M. novaeangliae LC
  - Family: Balaenidae
    - Genus: Eubalaena
      - North Atlantic right whale, Eubalaena glacialis CR possibly present
- Suborder: Odontoceti
  - Family: Physeteridae
    - Genus: Physeter
      - Sperm whale, Physeter macrocephalus VU
  - Family: Ziphidae
    - Genus: Ziphius
      - Cuvier's beaked whale, Ziphius cavirostris LC
    - Genus: Mesoplodon
      - Gervais' beaked whale, Ziphius cavirostris DD
  - Superfamily: Platanistoidea
    - Family: Delphinidae (marine dolphins)
      - Genus: Tursiops
        - Common bottlenose dolphin, Tursiops truncatus LC
      - Genus: Steno
        - Rough-toothed dolphin, S. bredanensis LC, presence uncertain
      - Genus: Stenella
        - Striped dolphin, Stenella coeruleoalba DD
        - Pantropical spotted dolphin, Stenella attenuata LR/cd (possible)
      - Genus: Sousa
        - Sousa chinensis DD
      - Genus: Delphinus
        - Short-beaked common dolphin, Delphinus delphis LC
      - Genus: Grampus
        - Risso's dolphin, Grampus griseus LC
      - Genus: Orcinus
        - Orca, Orcinus orca DD
      - Genus: Pseudorca
        - False killer whale, Pseudorca crassidens DD
      - Genus: Globicephala
        - Long-finned pilot whale, Globicephala melas DD

== Order: Chiroptera (bats) ==
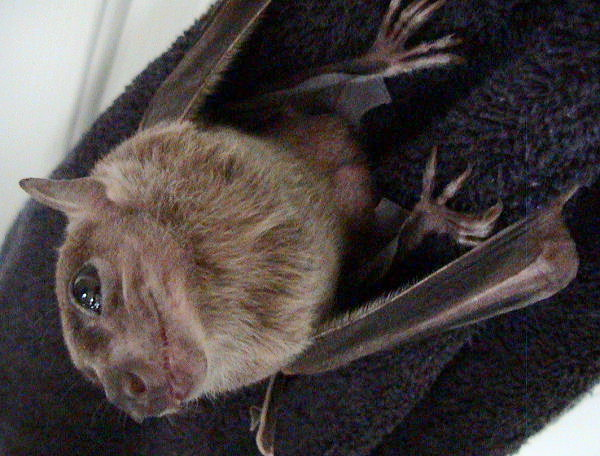
Egyptian fruit bat

The bats' most distinguishing feature is that their forelimbs are developed as wings, making them the only mammals capable of flight. Bat species account for about 20% of all mammals.

- Family: Pteropodidae (flying foxes, Old World fruit bats)
  - Subfamily: Pteropodinae
    - Genus: Rousettus
      - Egyptian fruit bat, R. aegyptiacus LC
- Family: Vespertilionidae
  - Subfamily: Myotinae
    - Genus: Myotis
      - Lesser mouse-eared bat, M. blythii LC
      - Greater mouse-eared bat, M. myotis LC
  - Subfamily: Vespertilioninae
    - Genus: Eptesicus
      - Botta's serotine, Eptesicus bottae LC
    - Genus: Otonycteris
      - Desert long-eared bat, Otonycteris hemprichii
    - Genus: Pipistrellus
      - Kuhl's pipistrelle, Pipistrellus kuhlii LC
    - Genus: Plecotus
      - Grey long-eared bat, Plecotus austriacus
  - Subfamily: Miniopterinae
    - Genus: Miniopterus
      - Common bent-wing bat, M. schreibersii VU
- Family: Rhinopomatidae
  - Genus: Rhinopoma
    - Egyptian mouse-tailed bat, R. cystops LC
- Family: Rhinolophidae
  - Subfamily: Rhinolophinae
    - Genus: Rhinolophus
      - Blasius's horseshoe bat, R. blasii LC
      - Mediterranean horseshoe bat, R. euryale NT
      - Greater horseshoe bat, R. ferrumequinum LC

== Order: Erinaceomorpha (hedgehogs and gymnures) ==
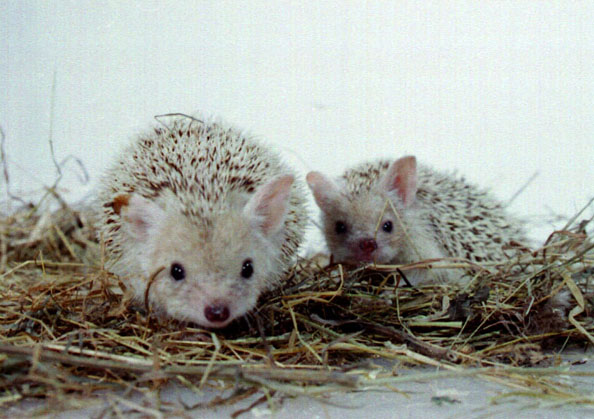
Long-eared hedgehog

The order Erinaceomorpha contains a single family, Erinaceidae, which comprise the hedgehogs and gymnures. The hedgehogs are easily recognised by their spines while gymnures look more like large rats.

- Family: Erinaceidae (hedgehogs)
  - Subfamily: Erinaceinae
    - Genus: Erinaceus
      - Southern white-breasted hedgehog, E. concolor LC
    - Genus: Hemiechinus
      - Long-eared hedgehog, H. auritus LC
    - Genus: Paraechinus
      - Desert hedgehog, P. aethiopicus LC

== Order: Hyracoidea (hyraxes) ==
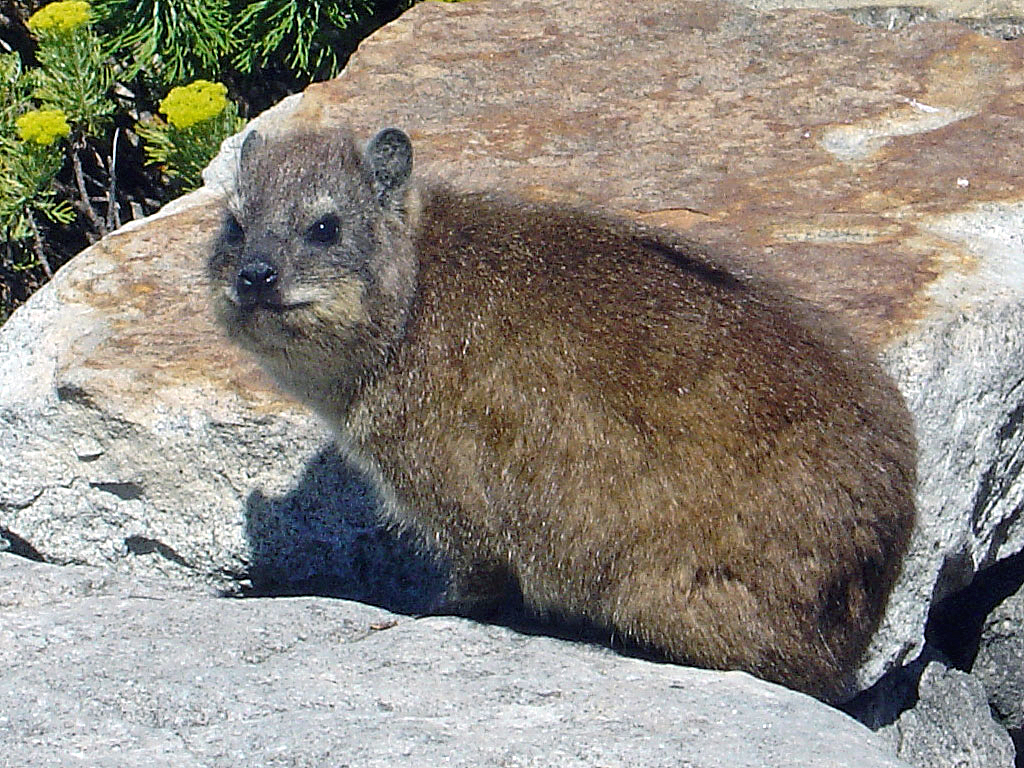
Cape hyrax

The hyraxes are four species of fairly small, thickset, herbivorous mammals in the order Hyracoidea. About the size of a domestic cat, they are well-furred, with rounded bodies and a stumpy tail. They are native to Africa and the Middle East.

- Family: Procaviidae (hyraxes)
  - Genus: Procavia
    - Cape hyrax, P. capensis LC

== Order: Lagomorpha (lagomorphs) ==
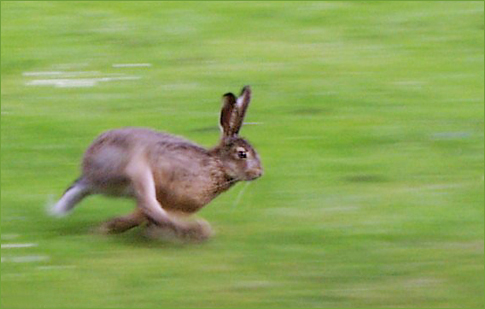
European hare

The lagomorphs comprise two families, Leporidae (hares and rabbits), and Ochotonidae (pikas). Though they can resemble rodents, and were classified as a superfamily in that order until the early 20th century, they have since been considered a separate order. They differ from rodents in a number of physical characteristics, such as having four incisors in the upper jaw rather than two.

- Family: Leporidae (rabbits, hares)
  - Genus: Lepus
    - Cape hare, L. capensis LC
    - European hare, L. europaeus LC

== Order: Rodentia (rodents) ==
Rodents make up the largest order of mammals, with over 40% of mammalian species. They have two incisors in the upper and lower jaw which grow continually and must be kept short by gnawing. Most rodents are small though the capybara can weigh up to 45 kg (99 lb).

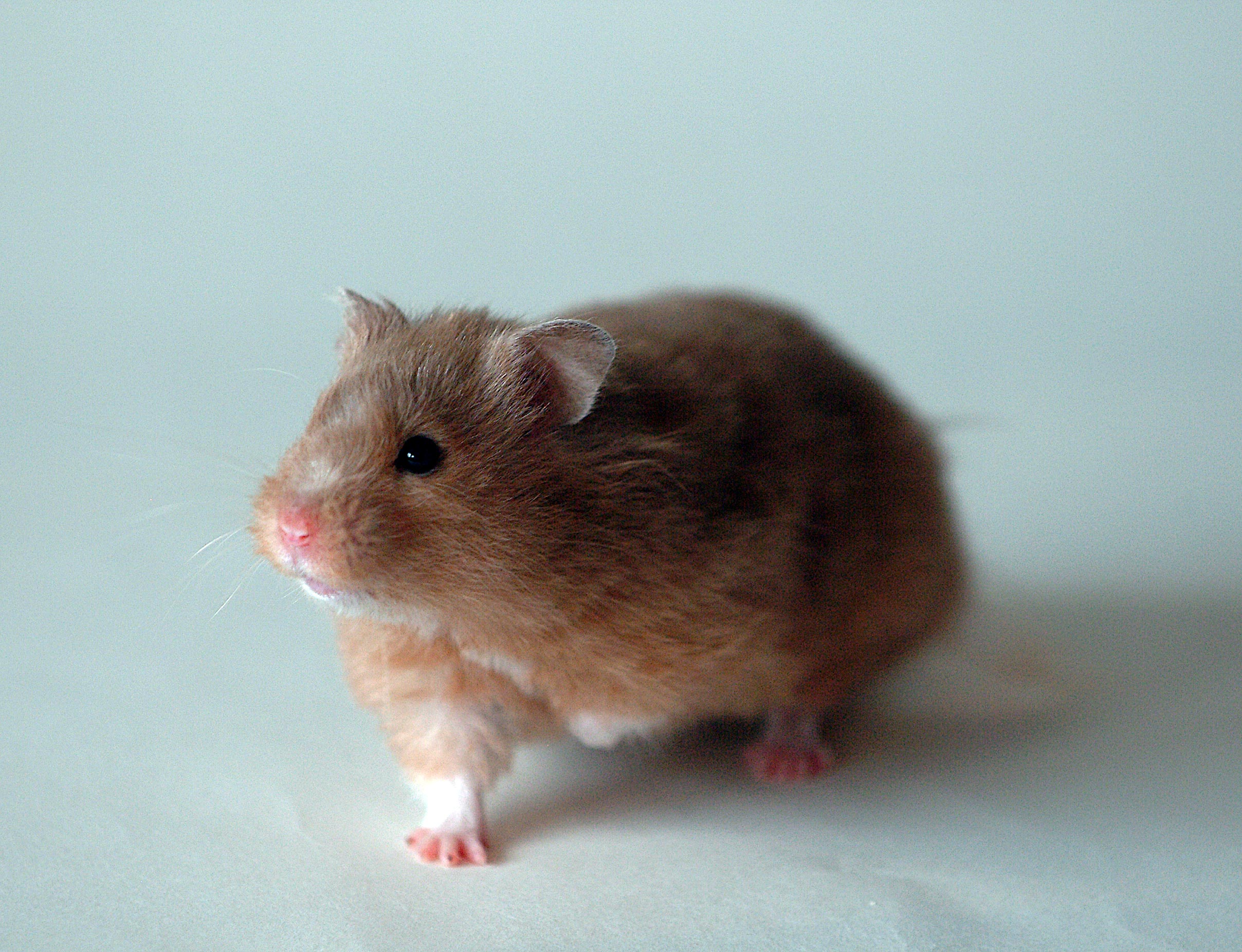
Golden hamster

- Suborder: Hystricognathi
  - Family: Hystricidae (Old World porcupines)
    - Genus: Hystrix
      - Indian crested porcupine, H. indica LC
- Suborder: Sciurognathi
  - Family: Sciuridae (squirrels)
    - Subfamily: Sciurinae
      - Tribe: Sciurini
        - Genus: Sciurus
          - Caucasian squirrel, S. anomalus LC
    - Subfamily: Xerinae
      - Tribe: Marmotini
        - Genus: Spermophilus
          - Asia Minor ground squirrel, Spermophilus xanthoprymnus
  - Family: Gliridae (dormice)
    - Subfamily: Leithiinae
      - Genus: Dryomys
        - Forest dormouse, Dryomys nitedula
      - Genus: Eliomys
        - Asian garden dormouse, Eliomys melanurus LC
  - Family: Dipodidae (jerboas)
    - Subfamily: Allactaginae
      - Genus: Allactaga
        - Euphrates jerboa, Allactaga euphratica
  - Family: Spalacidae
    - Subfamily: Spalacinae
      - Genus: Nannospalax
        - Palestine mole rat, Nannospalax ehrenbergi LC
  - Family: Calomyscidae
    - Genus: Calomyscus
      - Tsolov's mouse-like hamster, Calomyscus tsolovi
  - Family: Cricetidae
    - Subfamily: Cricetinae
      - Genus: Mesocricetus
        - Golden hamster, Mesocricetus auratus EN
        - Turkish hamster, Mesocricetus brandti LC
    - Subfamily: Arvicolinae
      - Genus: Chionomys
        - Snow vole, Chionomys nivalis
      - Genus: Microtus
        - Günther's vole, Microtus guentheri
        - Persian vole, Microtus irani
        - Social vole, Microtus socialis
  - Family: Muridae (mice, rats, voles, gerbils, hamsters, etc.)
    - Subfamily: Deomyinae
      - Genus: Acomys
        - Cairo spiny mouse, Acomys cahirinus LC
    - Subfamily: Gerbillinae
      - Genus: Gerbillus
        - Wagner's gerbil, Gerbillus dasyurus
      - Genus: Meriones
        - Sundevall's jird, Meriones crassus LC
        - Libyan jird, Meriones libycus LC
        - Tristram's jird, Meriones tristrami
        - Vinogradov's jird, Meriones vinogradovi
      - Genus: Psammomys
        - Sand rat, Psammomys obesus LC
      - Genus: Tatera
        - Indian gerbil, Tatera indica
    - Subfamily: Murinae
      - Genus: Apodemus
        - Yellow-necked mouse, Apodemus flavicollis
      - Genus: Mus
        - Macedonian mouse, Mus macedonicus
      - Genus: Nesokia
        - Short-tailed bandicoot rat, Nesokia indica LC

== Order: Soricomorpha (shrews, moles, and solenodons) ==
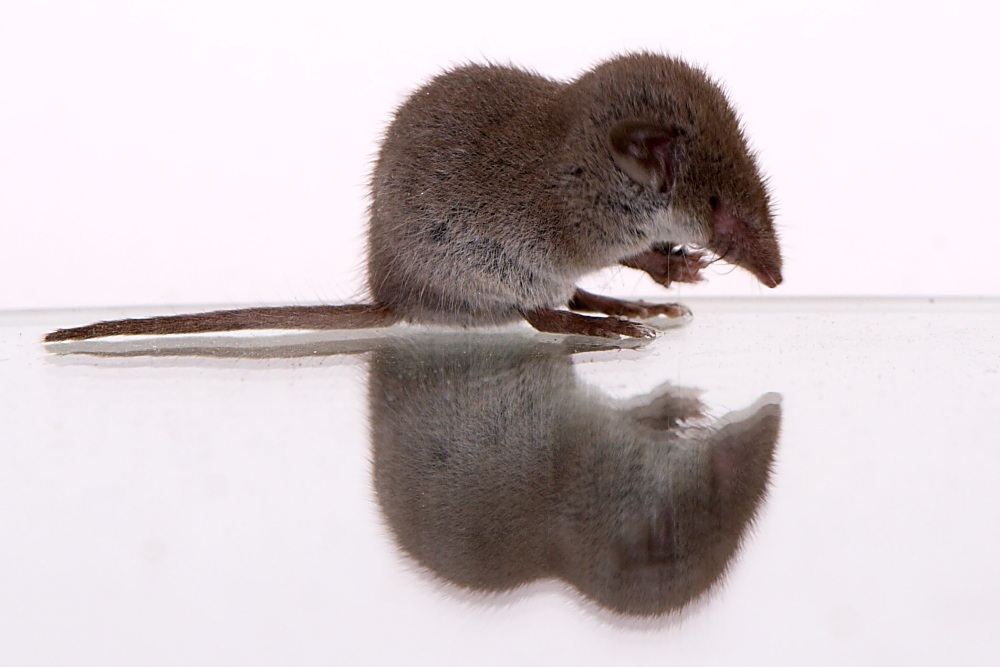
Lesser white-toothed shrew

The "shrew-forms" are insectivorous mammals. The shrews and solenodons closely resemble mice while the moles are stout-bodied burrowers.

- Family: Soricidae (shrews)
  - Subfamily: Crocidurinae
    - Genus: Crocidura
      - Lesser white-toothed shrew, C. suaveolens LC

== Locally extinct ==
The following species are locally extinct in the country:

- Cheetah, Acinonyx jubatus
- Wild goat, Capra aegagrus
- Red deer, Cervus elaphus
- Persian fallow deer, Dama mesopotamica
- Syrian elephant, Elephas maximus asurus
- Onager, Equus hemionus
- Arabian oryx, Oryx leucoryx
- Lion, Panthera leo
- Leopard, Panthera pardus
- Tiger, Panthera tigris

== See also ==
- Wildlife of Syria
- List of chordate orders
- Lists of mammals by region
- Mammal classification
