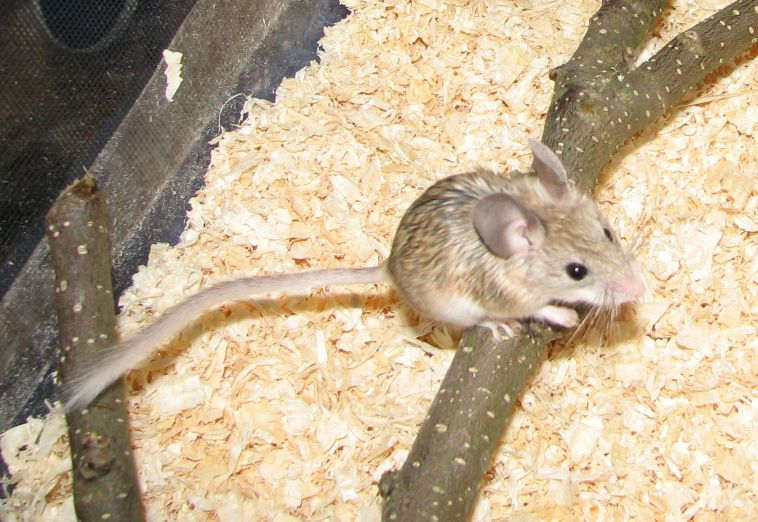

Conservation status
- Least Concern (IUCN 3.1)

Scientific classification
- Kingdom: Animalia
- Phylum: Chordata
- Class: Mammalia
- Order: Rodentia
- Family: Calomyscidae
- Genus: Calomyscus
- Species: C. urartensis

Binomial name
- Calomyscus urartensis Vorontsov, Kartavtseva, Potapova, 1979

= Urar mouse-like hamster =

Species of rodent

The Urar mouse-like hamster or Azerbaijani mouse-like hamster (Calomyscus urartensis) is a medium-sized mouse-like hamster from Nakhichevan, Azerbaijan and northwestern Azarbaijan Province, Iran. The species is named after the ancient kingdom of Urartu centered around the Armenian Highlands. It is among the better studied representatives of this poorly known genus. The initial species description was based on a unique chromosome number (2n=32; FNa=42) called a karyotype. The species status has been confirmed with other chromosomal studies and morphometric studies. The species description by Vorontsov et al. and subsequent prompted elevation of several subspecies of Calomyscus bailwardi to species status.

The species is slightly larger than the Great Balkhan mouse-like hamster, its sister taxon, and significantly larger than Hotson's mouse-like hamster. It has a yellowish tint to its ventral fur, which is notable as most mouse-like hamsters have pure white fur instead. The tail of the Urar mouse-like hamster is white at the tip but bicoloured throughout. Its head-body length is 78–91 millimetres (3.1–3.6 inches), the tail measures from 75–93 mm (3.0–3.7 in) its ear is roughly 20 mm (0.79 in) across, and the hindfoot measures from 19 to 22 mm (0.75 to 0.87 in). Adults weigh from 15 to 39 grams (0.53 to 1.38 ounces).
