= Ernest Hotson =

Sir Ernest Hotson KCSI OBE VD
- Born: John Ernest Buttery Hotson; 17 March 1877; Glasgow, Scotland
- Died: 13 May 1944 (aged 67)
- Occupations: Administrator, philatelist

Sir John Ernest Buttery Hotson, KCSI, OBE, VD (17 March 1877 – 13 May 1944) was an administrator in India during the British Raj. Born in Glasgow to Hamilton and Margaret (Maggie) Hotson, he was educated at Edinburgh Academy (1889–1895) and Magdalen College, Oxford, graduating BA in 1899, and MA (1905). He immediately joined the Indian Civil Service, being appointed Superintendent of Managed Estates in Kathiawar. His entire career was devoted to the administration of the province known as the Bombay Presidency. Subsequent positions included Under-Secretary to the Government of Bombay (Political and Judicial Departments), 1907; Collector, 1920; Secretary of the Political Department, 1922; Chief Secretary to the Government, 1924; Member of the Executive Council (MEC) of Bombay, 1926–31; and rising to become Home Member and Acting Governor of Bombay, 1931. He was appointed OBE on 3 June 1918, Companion of the Most Exalted Order of the Star of India (CSI) in the New Year Honours, 1926, and elevated to Knight Commander (KCSI) in 1930.

== Naturalist ==
Hotson served in the Indian Army Reserve of Officers, 1915 to 1920, in Baluchistan and Persia, attaining the rank of Lieutenant-Colonel. Hotson was a dedicated naturalist who "collected plants in Persian Baluchistan and Makran coast, 1916-18, which were sent to Father Blatter in Bombay". His collections of mammal specimens from the same region during this period was described by the noted British zoologist Oldfield Thomas, FRS, who noted:

Among the fine series of Mammals from Baluchistan contributed by Col. J.E.B. Hotson to the Bombay Natural History Society there occur a number of interesting small mammals which have been put into my hands for examination. As a result the following new species seem to require description.

Thomas then lists seven new species, two of which, Hotson's Jerboa (Allactaga hotsoni) and Hotson's Mouse-like Hamster (Calomyscus hotsoni) he names after their collector.

Hotson acted as Consul at Shiraz (Persia) between 1918 and 1920, during which time he continued his collecting of native mammals. The specimens he collected between February and August 1919 were described by Major R.E. Cheesman, MBOU, FRGS, and included a new species of Persian Vole (Microtus irani).

== Post-World War I service ==
In 1924 Hotson married Mildred Alice, daughter of Arthur Bennett Steward (a fellow member of the ICS); this coincides with his elevation to the position of Chief Secretary to the Government of Bombay. This was a period of rising instability in India, that would lead eventually to its independence from the British crown in 1947. Mahatma Gandhi's theory of non-violent resistance to British rule, Satyagraha, was not always followed, especially within the Presidency (State) of Maharashtra that surrounded Bombay. After the arrest of the national leaders Khurshed Nariman and Jamnalal Bajaj on 8 May 1930, mass demonstrations in the district of Sholapur led the Collector, Mr Knight, to seek advice from Hotson who was now in Bombay as the Home Member. The visit resulted in the imposition of martial law on 12 May. Martial law was lifted on 30 June, however, a year later, on 22 July 1931, as Acting Governor of Bombay in the period after the departure of Sir Frederick Sykes, Hotson was visiting the library of Fergusson College in Pune (Poona) when one of the students, Vasudeo Balwant Gogte (Gogate), attempted to assassinate him. The bullet was stopped by a metal stud on Hotson's clothes, and he escaped unharmed. When asked why he had shot at the Home Member, Gogte is reported to have said "As a protest against your tyrannical administration". Remarkably, Hotson did not merely agree to Gogate's early release from Jail, he sent him a cheque for Rs. 100 as a token of goodwill and the hope that it would enable the young man to establish himself in a profession.

As well as a naturalist, Hotson was also a keen philatelist, serving as President of the Philatelic Society of India, and editor of the Philatelic Journal of India, 1923–28.
