= Goodwin's brush-tailed mouse =

Conservation status
- Least Concern (IUCN 3.1)

Scientific classification
- Kingdom: Animalia
- Phylum: Chordata
- Class: Mammalia
- Order: Rodentia
- Family: Calomyscidae
- Genus: Calomyscus
- Species: C. elburzensis

Binomial name
- Calomyscus elburzensis Goodwin, 1938

Species of rodent

Goodwin's brush-tailed mouse (Calomyscus elburzensis), also known as Goodwin's calomyscus, is a species of mouse-like hamster. It is found in rocky areas in mountains of northeastern and northern Iran, western Afghanistan, and southern Turkmenistan.
