= Hotson's mouse-like hamster =

Conservation status
- Least Concern (IUCN 3.1)

Scientific classification
- Kingdom: Animalia
- Phylum: Chordata
- Class: Mammalia
- Order: Rodentia
- Family: Calomyscidae
- Genus: Calomyscus
- Species: C. hotsoni

Binomial name
- Calomyscus hotsoni Thomas, 1920

Species of rodent

Hotson's mouse-like hamster (Calomyscus hotsoni) also known as Hotson's calomyscus or Hotson's brush-tailed mouse is a species of rodent in the family Calomyscidae. It is endemic to southwestern Pakistan and southeastern Iran (Norris et al., 2008).

== Name ==
The species was named by Oldfield Thomas after John Ernest Buttery Hotson who collected the original 4 specimens in Balochistan in 1918. The species had traditionally been called Hotson's mouse-like hamster because of the presumed relationship between members of the genus Calomyscus and the hamsters. Musser and Carleton (1993) considered Calomyscus to be distinct enough from the hamsters to warrant a distinct subfamily. Numerous molecular studies (Michaux et al., 2001; Jansa and Weksler, 2004; Steppan et al., 2004) have supported the distinctive nature of the genus, and they are currently recognized as belonging to a distinct family, Calomyscidae.

In order to underscore that members of the genus Calomyscus are not related to hamsters, Musser and Carlton (2005) suggested the name Hotson's calomyscus, using the genus name as a common name. Norris et al. (2008) agreed that the use of the term "hamster" should be avoided, but disagreed with the application of a genus name in place of a common name. Although they preferred the use of a local name, they reported that the languages of southern Pakistan do not distinguish among small rodent species (see haraam). Instead, Norris et al. (2008) proposed that the species be referred to as Hotson's brush-tailed mouse, identifying a major morphological feature of the genus. The IUCN have since adopted this as the primary common name, but also list Hotson's mouse-like hamster (but not Hotson's Calomyscus). As with most species of small mammal, common names are rarely used outside of checklists and field guides, and most researchers employ the binomial name, Calomyscus hotsoni.

== Distribution and characteristics ==
Because it was only known from the 4 specimens of the type series at the time, Baillie (1996) categorized Hotson's brush-tailed mouse as endangered. Musser and Carleton (2005 later referred 12 individuals collected by Gary Ranck in 1962 from southeastern Iran to this species. Norris et al. (2008) reported collecting C. hotsoni in Panjgur District (5 individuals), near Shergart Fort in Dadu District (1 individual), Hingol National Park (1 individual), and near Wadh (2 individuals). Currently Calomyscus hotsoni is present in 4 museums: the Bombay Museum of Natural History (3 individuals), the Field Museum (1 individual), the Smithsonian (12 individuals), and the Florida Museum of Natural History (9 individuals). With new information suggesting the species was more widespread than previously thought, the IUCN Red List listed the species as Least Concern.

Calomyscus hotsoni is smaller than the other species in Pakistan (C. baluchi), and has a smaller hind foot. It has "black-tipped, pale yellow-brown pelage". The two species in Pakistan are distinguishable by several cranial characteristics and genetic evidence suggests they diverged roughly 2 million years ago (Norris et al., 2008).

== Natural history ==
Calomyscus hotsoni is found at elevations ranging from 67–1,890 m (220–6,200 ft). It tends to be found in rocky habitats in arid regions particularly in association with dwarf palms (Nannorrhops ritchiana). Norris et al. (2008) report having captured Mus saxicola and Acomys dimidiatus in the same areas.
