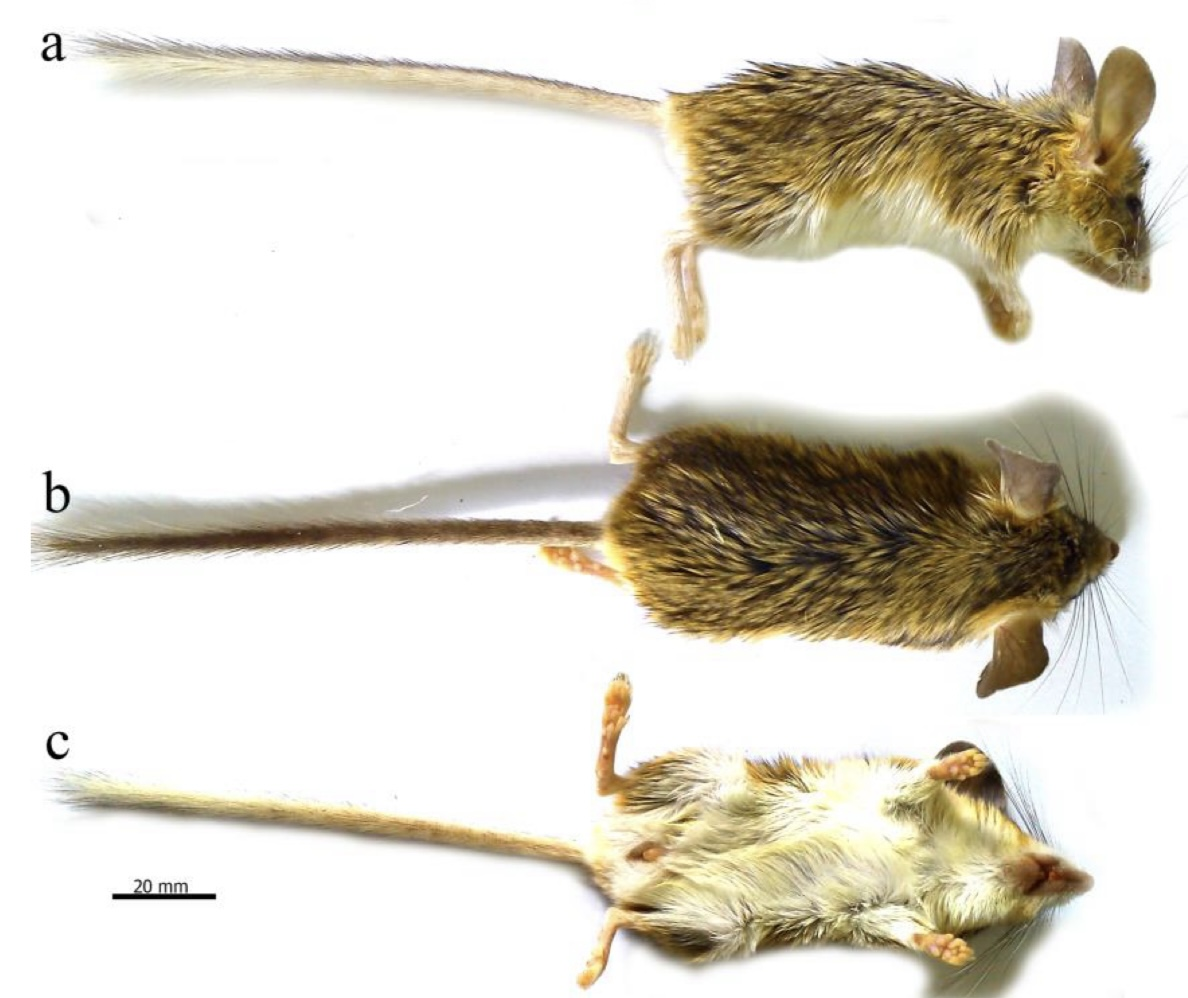
- Holotype of C. kermanensis

Scientific classification
- Kingdom: Animalia
- Phylum: Chordata
- Class: Mammalia
- Order: Rodentia
- Family: Calomyscidae
- Genus: Calomyscus
- Species: C. kermanensis

Binomial name
- Calomyscus kermanensis Dezhman, Akbarirad, Aliabadian, Siahsarvie, Shafaeipour, & Mirshamsi, 2023

= Kerman brush-tailed mouse =

Species of mammal

The Kerman brush-tailed mouse (Calomyscus kermanensis) is a species of mouse-like hamster native to Iran. It was described in 2023 by a group of researchers from the Ferdowsi University of Mashhad and Yasouj University in Iran. The species was distinguished from other members of its genus based on unique variations in its mitochondrial DNA and its particularly tall cranium. Its type locality is the Sirch region of Kerman province, Iran.

The Kerman brush-tailed mouse is found on rocky mountainside habitats with sparse vegetation throughout the Zagros Mountains in the south of Iran. Its populations appear to be heavily fragmented, but no major threats to the species are known.

== See also ==
- List of living mammal species described in the 2020s
