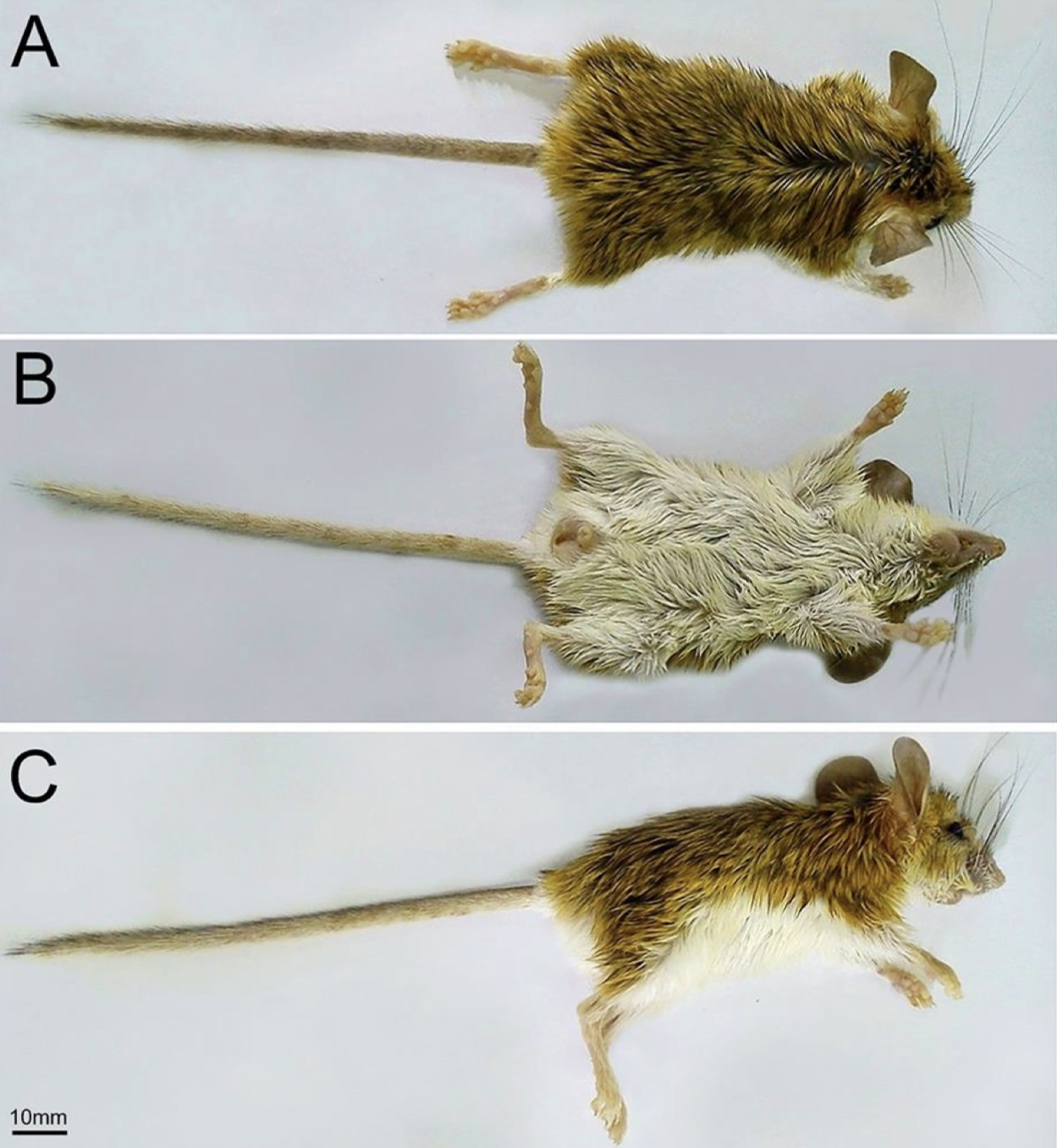
- Specimen

Scientific classification
- Kingdom: Animalia
- Phylum: Chordata
- Class: Mammalia
- Order: Rodentia
- Family: Calomyscidae
- Genus: Calomyscus
- Species: C. behzadi

Binomial name
- Calomyscus behzadi Akharirad, Dezhman, Aliabadian, Siahsarvie, Shafaeipour, & Mirshamsi, 2021

= Behzad's brush-tailed mouse =

Species of mammal

The Behzad's brush-tailed mouse (Calomyscus behzadi) is a species of mouse-like hamster. It is found in western Iran, where it is found in rocky areas in mountains. It is named after the Iranian biologist Professor Mahmoud Behzad.

== See also ==
- List of living mammal species described in the 2020s
