= Mahmoud Behzad =

Iranian biologist (1913–2007)

Mahmoud Behzad (Persian: محمود بهزاد,1913–2007), was an Iranian biologist. He was born in Rasht, the capital city of Gilan province. He is known as the father of modern biology in Iran. He wrote more than 100 books in Persian and participated in the authorship of more than 200 books in Iran.

The son of a lapidarist, Behzad completed his initial education in Rasht before pursuing his bachelor's degree at the teachers' training college (Dāneshsarāy-e 'Āli) in Tehran.

He was the founder of Iran Scholarly Books Editing Organization and was fluent in English, French and German. Behzad was known for the books of French science writer Jean Rostand and English naturalist Charles Darwin that he translated.

He worked for more than five years in Alborz High School as vice president and biology teacher.

In the last years of his life, Behzad worked in Shargh pharmacy in Rasht where he was ready to answer his fans and former students.

He died due to stomach cancer in his home in Rasht.

His older son, Prof. Faramarz Behzad, was previously a lecturer of Persian at the University of Bamberg, and a lexicographer. His only daughter, Prof. Parichehr Behzad, works in the research department of LMU Munich. Behzad's younger son, Hooshang Behzad, lives and works in Shiraz as an architect.

The Iran-endemic rodent species Calomyscus behzadi was named after him in 2021.

== See also ==
- Alborz High School
- List of Iranian scientists and scholars
- Higher education in Iran
