= Tsolov's mouse-like hamster =

Conservation status
- Data Deficient (IUCN 3.1)

Scientific classification
- Kingdom: Animalia
- Phylum: Chordata
- Class: Mammalia
- Order: Rodentia
- Family: Calomyscidae
- Genus: Calomyscus
- Species: C. tsolovi

Binomial name
- Calomyscus tsolovi Peshev, 1991

Species of rodent

Tsolov's mouse-like hamster or Syrian calomyscus (Calomyscus tsolovi) is a species of rodent in the family Calomyscidae. It is endemic to Syria.
