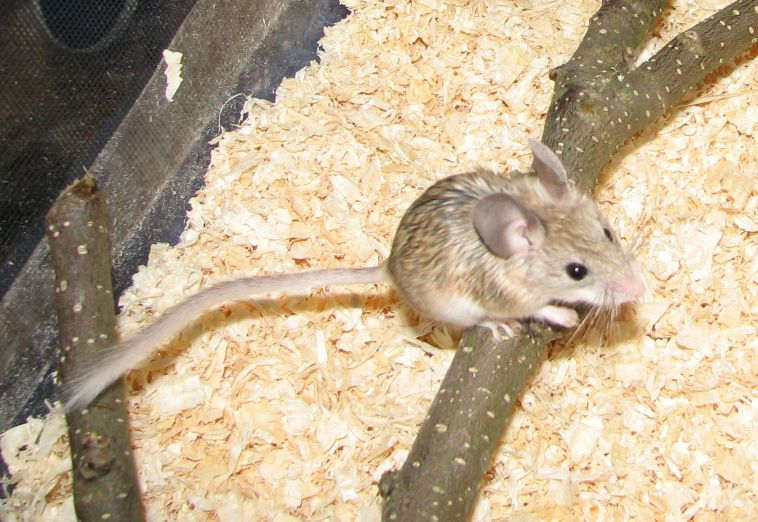
- an unknown species of mouse-like hamster

Conservation status
- Least Concern (IUCN 3.1)

Scientific classification
- Kingdom: Animalia
- Phylum: Chordata
- Class: Mammalia
- Order: Rodentia
- Family: Calomyscidae
- Genus: Calomyscus
- Species: C. mystax

Binomial name
- Calomyscus mystax Kashkarov, 1925

Synonyms
- Calomyscus bailward mystax Kashkarov, 1925

= Great Balkhan mouse-like hamster =

Species of rodent

The Great Balkhan mouse-like hamster (Calomyscus mystax), also known as the Afghan mouse-like hamster or Great Balkhan mouse-tailed hamster, is a species of rodent in the family Calomyscidae, the mouse-like hamsters. This rodent is found in south-western and southern central Asia.

== Taxonomy ==
The Great Balkhan mouse-like hamster was first formally describbed in 1925 by the Russian zoologist Daniil Nikolaevich Kashkarov with its type locality given as Bashi-Mugur in the Great Balkhan mountains in souther Turkmenistan. This species, like all of the species in the genus Calomyscus, was formerly considered to be part of a single speciesC. bailwardi, but this has now been split into a number of species based on major differences in chromosome number, skull measurements, genetic data, and other features. The genus Calomyscus is the only genus in the family Calomyscidae which is seen as a basal taxon in the mouse-like rodents.

== Distribution and habitat ==
The Great Balkhan mouse-like hamster is found in southwestern Asia and southern Central Asia in the Kopetdag, Great and Lesser Balkhan, south-western Badkhyz regions of Turkmenistan, Transcaucasia in the south of the Nakhichevan Republic, northern Iran and possibly northwestern Afghanistan, although its presence in Afghanistan is yet to be confirmed. This species occurs in rocky mountain steppe, particularly cliff openings and scree, where there is shrubs or rare grass and wormwood vegetation, as well as in areas of juniper thickets.

== Biology ==
The Great Balkhan mouse-like hamster is found either in groups or as individuals. During the summer months it is nocturnal, while in the spring and autumn they are also diurnal. Its diet is mainly seeds, and to a lesser extent the leaves and shoots of grasses and shrubs. They have been observed to eat insects, their larvae and small spiders in captivity. They breed from end of March up to the start of May. Litters are usually between 3 and 5 babies, with 7 being the maximum size. Some females give birth a second litter in the early summer.
