= Baluchi mouse-like hamster =

Conservation status
- Least Concern (IUCN 3.1)

Scientific classification
- Kingdom: Animalia
- Phylum: Chordata
- Class: Mammalia
- Order: Rodentia
- Family: Calomyscidae
- Genus: Calomyscus
- Species: C. baluchi

Binomial name
- Calomyscus baluchi Thomas, 1920

Species of rodent

The Baluchi mouse-like hamster (Calomyscus baluchi) is a species of rodent in the family Calomyscidae. It is found in Afghanistan and Pakistan.
