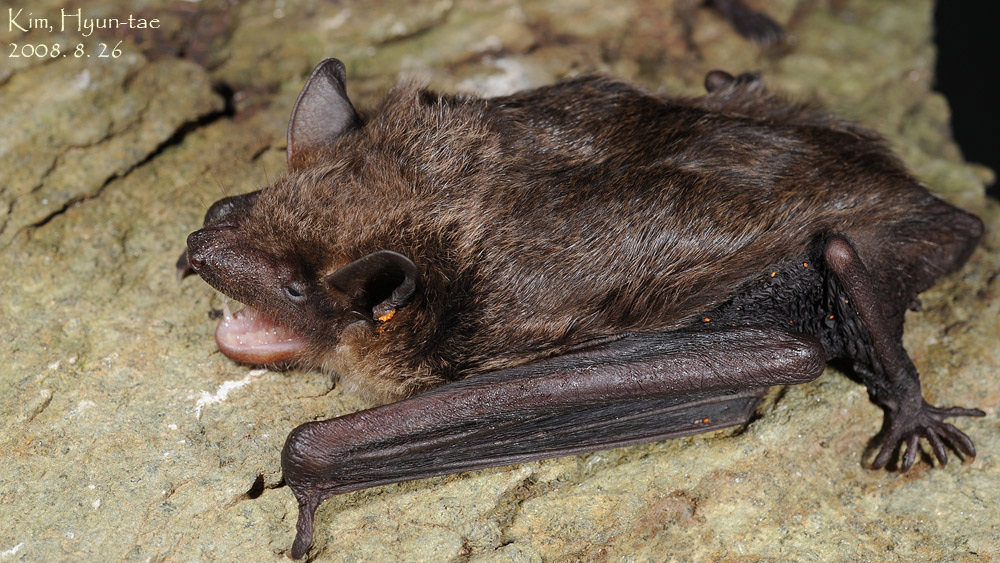

Conservation status
- Least Concern (IUCN 3.1)

Scientific classification
- Kingdom: Animalia
- Phylum: Chordata
- Class: Mammalia
- Order: Chiroptera
- Family: Vespertilionidae
- Genus: Eptesicus
- Species: E. pachyomus

Binomial name
- Eptesicus pachyomus Tomes, 1857
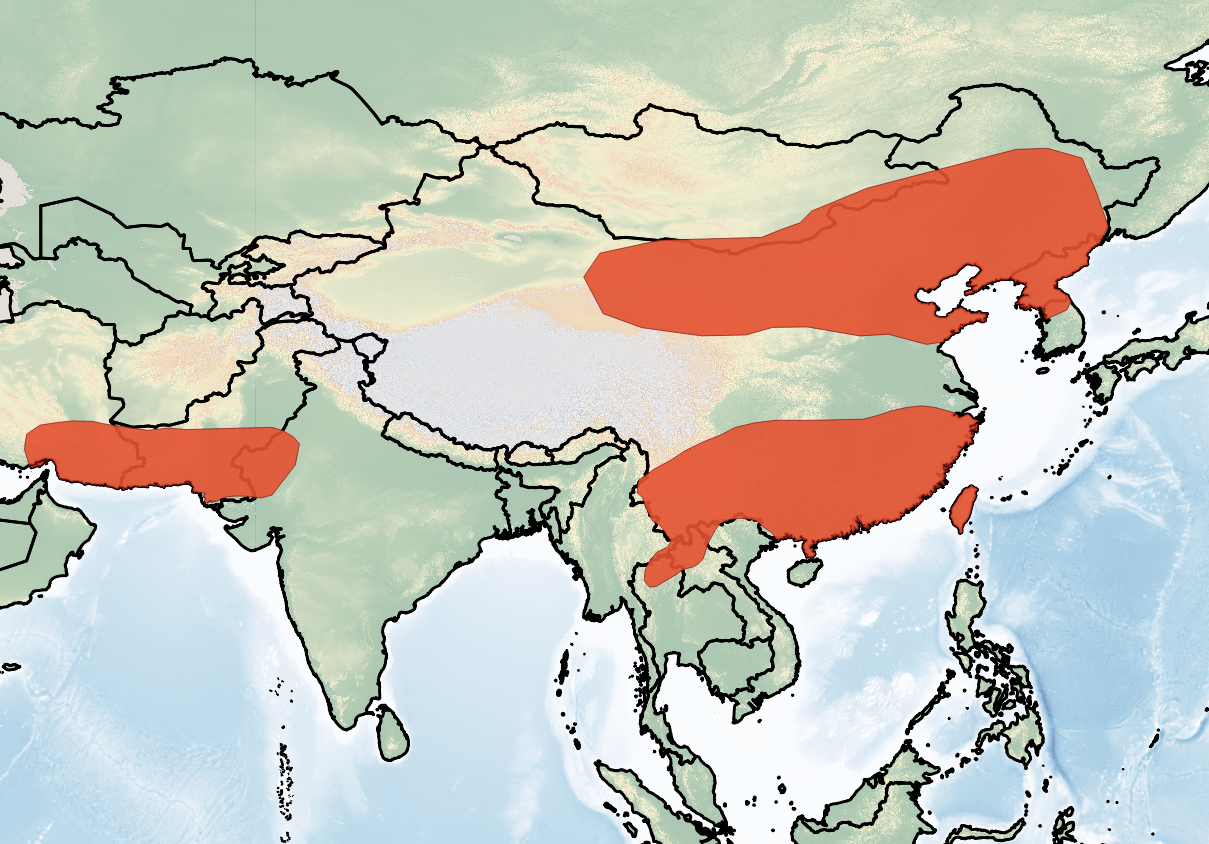

Synonyms
- Cnephaeus pachyomus

= Oriental serotine =

Species of bat

The Oriental serotine (Eptesicus pachyomus) is a species of bat in the family Vespertilionidae. It is widespread and found throughout Asia.

== Taxonomy ==
This species was formerly considered a subspecies of the serotine bat (E. serotinus), which is thought to be its closest relative. However, a 2013 study found significant genetic divergence between E. serotinus and E. pachyomus, and thus pachyomus was raised to species status. These results have been accepted by the American Society of Mammalogists, IUCN Red List, and ITIS.

It has four subspecies:

- E. p. pachyomus: India, Nepal, possibly Myanmar
- E. p. andersoni: eastern Asia
- E. p. pallens: western China
- E. p. horikawai: Taiwan

== Habitat and distribution ==
The species is widespread and in found in China, Taiwan, Laos, Myanmar, Thailand, Vietnam, India, Pakistan and Iran. It inhabits habitats such as semi-desert, steppe habitats, and tropical forests. It roosts in shaded areas such as cracks in rocks and buildings. It also occasionally roosts in the frontal part of caves. It generally roosts alone or in small groups.

== Biology ==
It feeds on butterflies and moths.

== Conservation ==
The bat has been assessed by the IUCN as least-concern. The bat does not require any conservation actions, and occurs in protected regions across its range.
