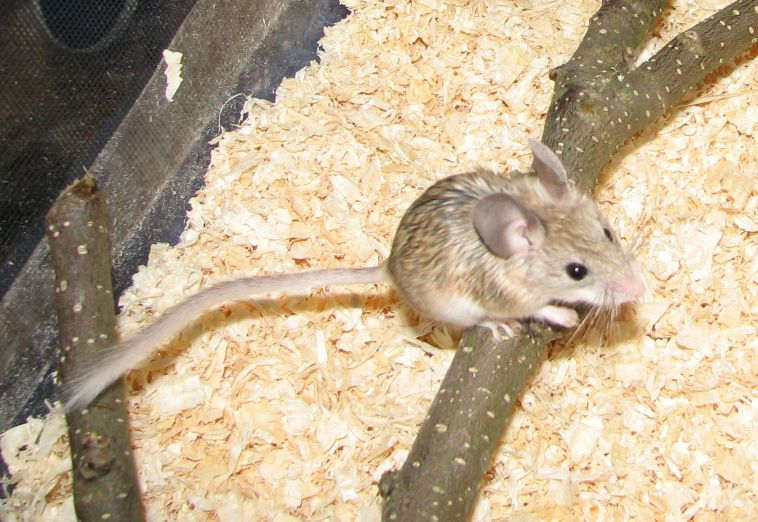

Scientific classification
- Kingdom: Animalia
- Phylum: Chordata
- Class: Mammalia
- Order: Rodentia
- Superfamily: Muroidea
- Family: Calomyscidae; Vorontsov & Potapova, 1979
- Genus: Calomyscus; Thomas, 1905

Type species
- Calomyscus bailwardi Thomas, 1905

Species
- Calomyscus bailwardi Calomyscus baluchi Calomyscus behzadi Calomyscus elburzensis Calomyscus grandis Calomyscus hotsoni Calomyscus kermanensis Calomyscus mystax Calomyscus tsolovi Calomyscus urartensis
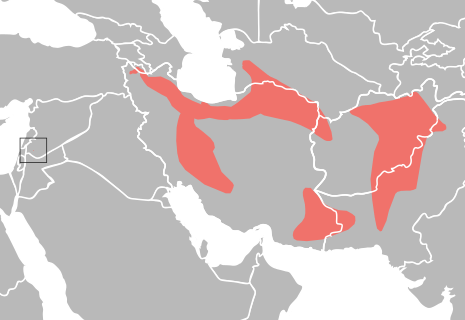
- Calomyscidae distribution

= Mouse-like hamster =

Mouse-like hamster Temporal range: Late Miocene–Recent

Genus of rodents

Mouse-like hamsters, also called brush-tailed mice or calomyscids, are a group of small rodents belonging to the genus Calomyscus found in Syria, Azerbaijan, Iran, Turkmenistan, Afghanistan, and Pakistan. They are found in rocky outcrops and semi-mountainous areas in desert regions. The generic name Calomyscus derives from the Greek word kalos, meaning 'beautiful'; the full name translates to "beautiful mouse".

The mouse-like hamsters are not true hamsters, but represent an early split from the rest of the mouse-like rodents. They were once thought to be hamsters based on the shape of their molars, but they lack the cheek pouches, flank glands and short tails of the true hamsters. The closest relatives of the mouse-like hamsters may be the extinct Cricetodontidae. Because of their seemingly early break from the rest of the mouse-like rodents, mouse-like hamsters have been placed in a family of their own, Calomyscidae, and have been referred to as living fossils.

All members of the genus were once considered part of the same species, Calomyscus bailwardi, but they are now considered separate species due to major differences in chromosome number, skull measurements, and other features. Several species have been discovered in the 2020s, including Behzad's brush-tailed mouse (C. behzadi) and the Kerman brush-tailed mouse (C. kermanensis). There are two known extinct species: C. delicatus Aguilar et al. 1984 and C. minor de Bruijn et al. 1970.

== Species ==
The family Calomyscidae consists of 8 extant species in one genus, excluding hybrid species or extinct prehistoric species. Only one of these species, Goodwin's brush-tailed mouse, has more than one subspecies. The cladogram below is based on that produced by Rezazadeh and colleagues in 2024, and excludes Calomyscus tsolovi due to deficient data.

- Calomyscidae
  - - - Calomyscus bailwardi
      - Calomyscus baluchi
    - Calomyscus hotsoni
  - - Calomyscus mystax
    - - Calomyscus grandis
      - - Calomyscus urartensis
        - Calomyscus elburzensis

Genus Calomyscus – Thomas, 1905 – 8 species
Common name	Scientific name and subspecies	Range	Size and ecology	IUCN status and estimated population
Zagros Mountains mouse-like hamster	C. bailwardi Thomas, 1905	Iran	Size: Habitat: Shrubland and rocky areas Diet:	LC Unknown
Baluchi mouse-like hamster	C. baluchi Thomas, 1920	Afghanistan and Pakistan	Size: Habitat: Shrubland, grassland and rocky areas Diet:	LC Unknown
Goodwin's brush-tailed mouse	C. elburzensis Goodwin, 1938 One subspecies: C. e. zykovi	Northeastern Iran, southwestern Turkmenistan, northwest Afghanistan	Size: Habitat: Shrubland, grassland and rocky areas Diet:	LC Unknown
Noble mouse-like hamster	C. grandis Schlitter & Setzer, 1973	Alborz, Iran	Size: Habitat: Forest Diet:	DD Unknown
Hotson's mouse-like hamster	C. hotsoni Thomas, 1920	Southeastern Iran, southwestern Pakistan	Size: Habitat: Shrubland, grassland and rocky areas Diet:	DD Unknown
Great Balkhan mouse-like hamster	C. mystax Kashkarov, 1925	South Turkmenistan, northern Iran, Transcaucasia, northwestern Afghanistan	Size: Habitat: Grassland Diet:	LC Unknown
Tsolov's mouse-like hamster	C. tsolovi Peshev, 1991	Southwest Syria	Size: Habitat: Shrubland, rocky areas Diet:	LC Unknown
Urar mouse-like hamster	C. urartensis Vorontsov, Kartavtseva & Potapova, 1979	Southern Azerbaijan, northwestern Iran	Size: Habitat: Shrubland, grassland and rocky areas Diet:	LC Unknown

== Relationship with humans ==
In Europe, a species of Calomyscus is available as a pet. They are labelled Calomyscus bailwardi mystax or Calomyscus bailwardi. They are generally only available from dedicated breeders, not pet shops. Members of the genus are not considered to be pests, as their native ranges span areas that are sparsely inhabited by humans, and they do not consume crops on a large scale nor do they harbor human diseases.

== Conservation ==
Though most of the mouse-like hamsters are considered to be least-concern species by the International Union for Conservation of Nature, two are listed as data deficient largely due to an absence of information about them. Tsolov's mouse-like hamster is known only from a few specimens collected in 1982, and the noble mouse-like hamster, though it is thought to occupy a wide range across the Elburz Mountains, is extremely sparsely studied.
