= Persian vole =

Conservation status
- Vulnerable (IUCN 3.1)

Scientific classification
- Kingdom: Animalia
- Phylum: Chordata
- Class: Mammalia
- Order: Rodentia
- Family: Cricetidae
- Subfamily: Arvicolinae
- Genus: Microtus
- Subgenus: Microtus
- Species: M. irani

Binomial name
- Microtus irani Thomas, 1921

Species of rodent

The Persian vole (Microtus irani) is a species of rodent in the family Cricetidae. It is only found in Iran.
