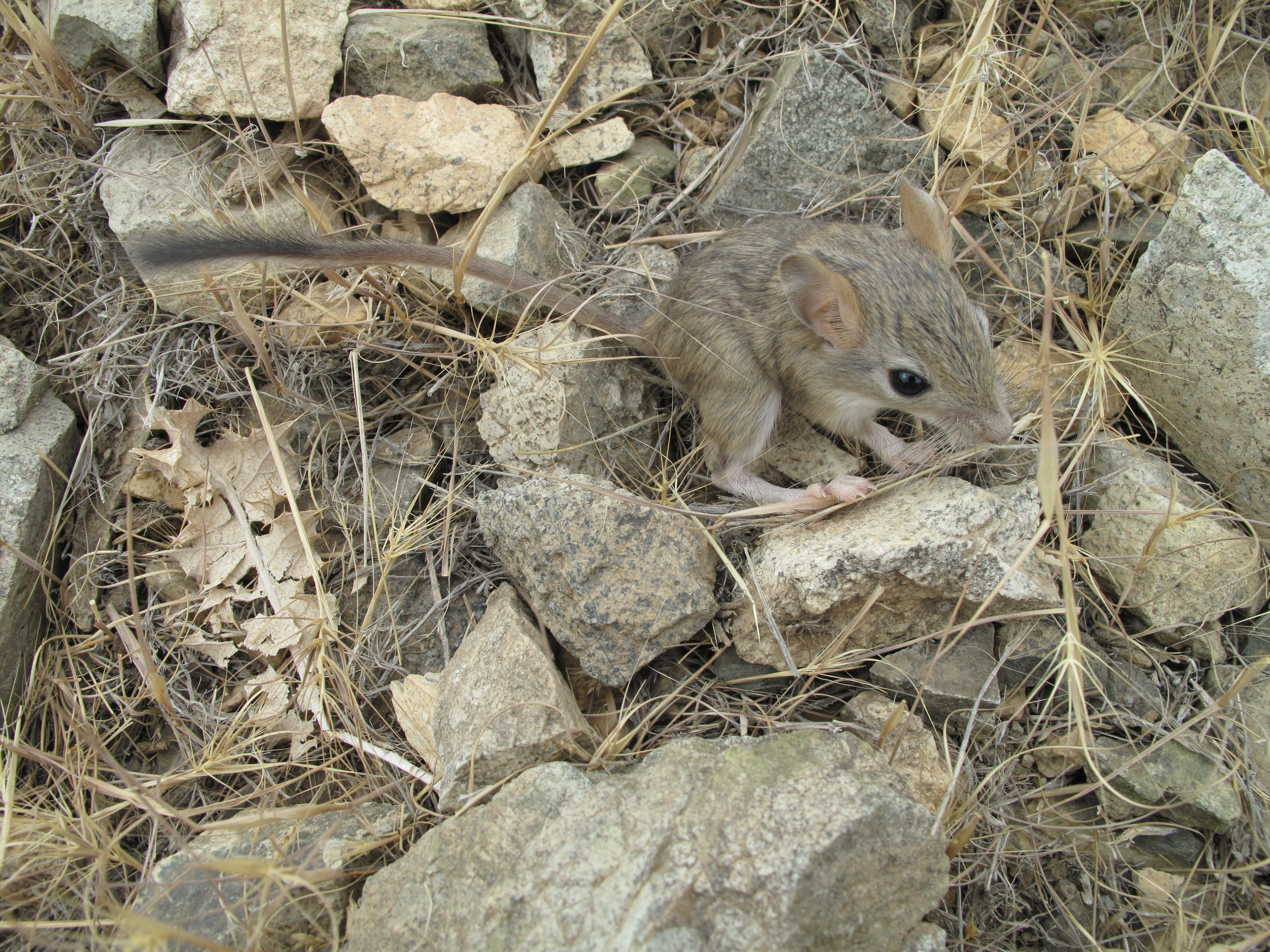

Conservation status
- Least Concern (IUCN 3.1)

Scientific classification
- Kingdom: Animalia
- Phylum: Chordata
- Class: Mammalia
- Order: Rodentia
- Family: Calomyscidae
- Genus: Calomyscus
- Species: C. bailwardi

Binomial name
- Calomyscus bailwardi Thomas, 1905

= Zagros Mountains mouse-like hamster =

Species of rodent

The Zagros Mountains mouse-like hamster (Calomyscus bailwardi) is a relatively little-known rodent which was the first species of mouse-like hamster to be described. The species is distributed throughout much of southern Iran, particularly in the Zagros mountains. It is also known as the Iranian mouse-like hamster, though there are several species of mouse-like hamster found in different parts of Iran.

This is the largest species of mouse-like hamster. They are dark grey on top and white underneath. They are found in habitat ranging from barren rocky hillsides to wetter regions. They are known to feed on herbs and grass seed.

Graphodatsky et al. (2000) recovered three distinct karyotypes from different regions throughout the range of C. bailwardi (2n=37, FNa=44; 2n=52, FNa=56; 2n=50, FNa=50). This may suggest that further taxonomic revision is required. Vorontsov et al. (1979) emphasized how little is known about the species and that the current definition is based largely on distribution.

Many sources still refer to all members of Calomyscus as part of the species C. bailwardi.
