= Tungurahua =

Volcano in Ecuador

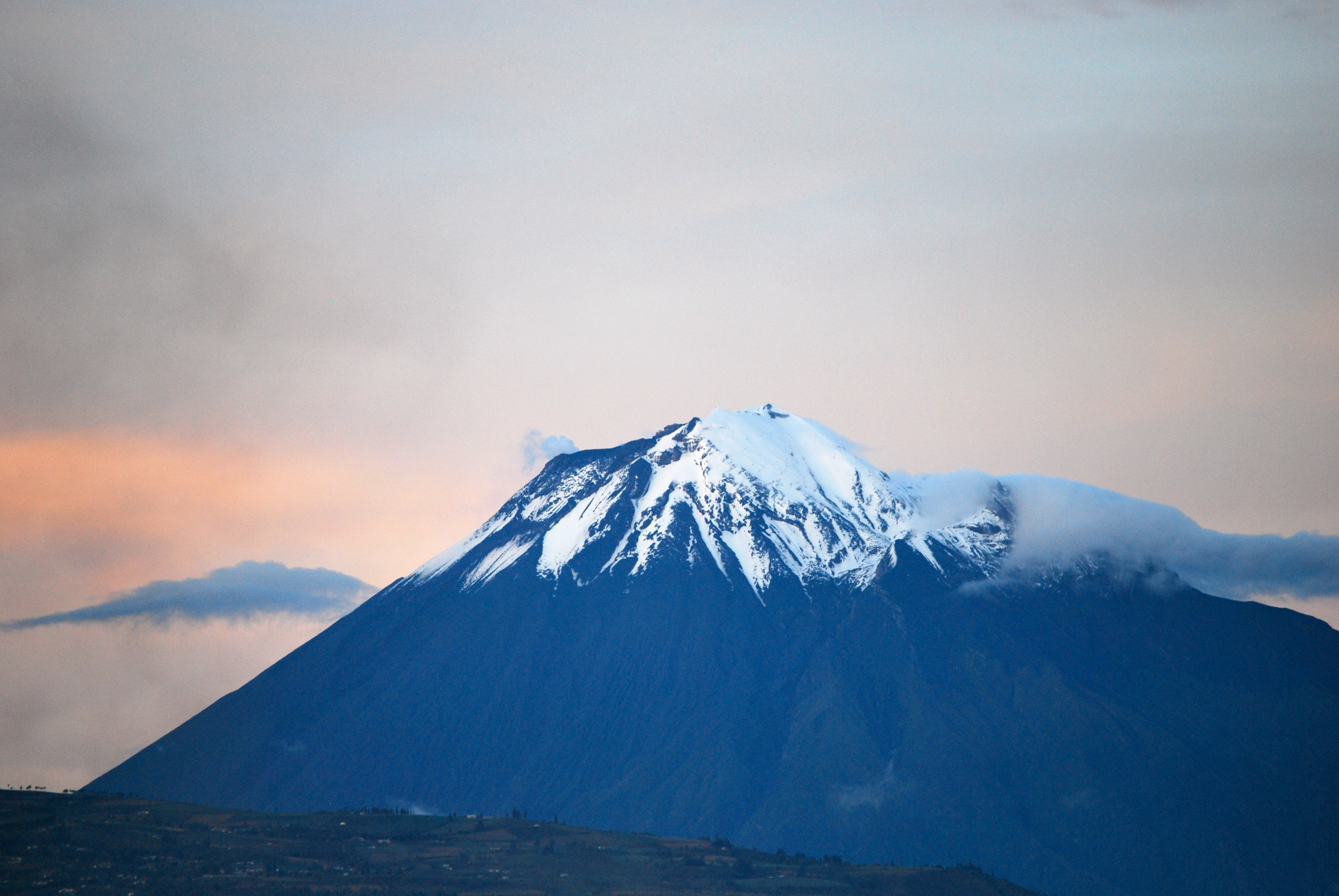
- View from Riobamba (September 2011)

Highest point
- Elevation: 5,023 m (16,480 ft)
- Prominence: 1,554 m (5,098 ft)
- Listing: Ultra
- Coordinates: 1.4700°S 78.4447°W

Naming
- English translation: Throat of fire
- Language of name: Quechua

Geography
- Location: Ecuador
- Parent range: Cordillera Oriental, Andes
- Topo map(s): IGM, CT-ÑIV-D1

Geology
- Rock age: Holocene (Gomez 1994)
- Mountain type: Stratovolcano (active)
- Volcanic zone: Northern Volcanic Zone
- Last eruption: 1999 to 2017

Climbing
- First ascent: 1873 by Alphons Stübel and Wilhelm Reiss
- Easiest route: Scrambling/Snow/Ice PD

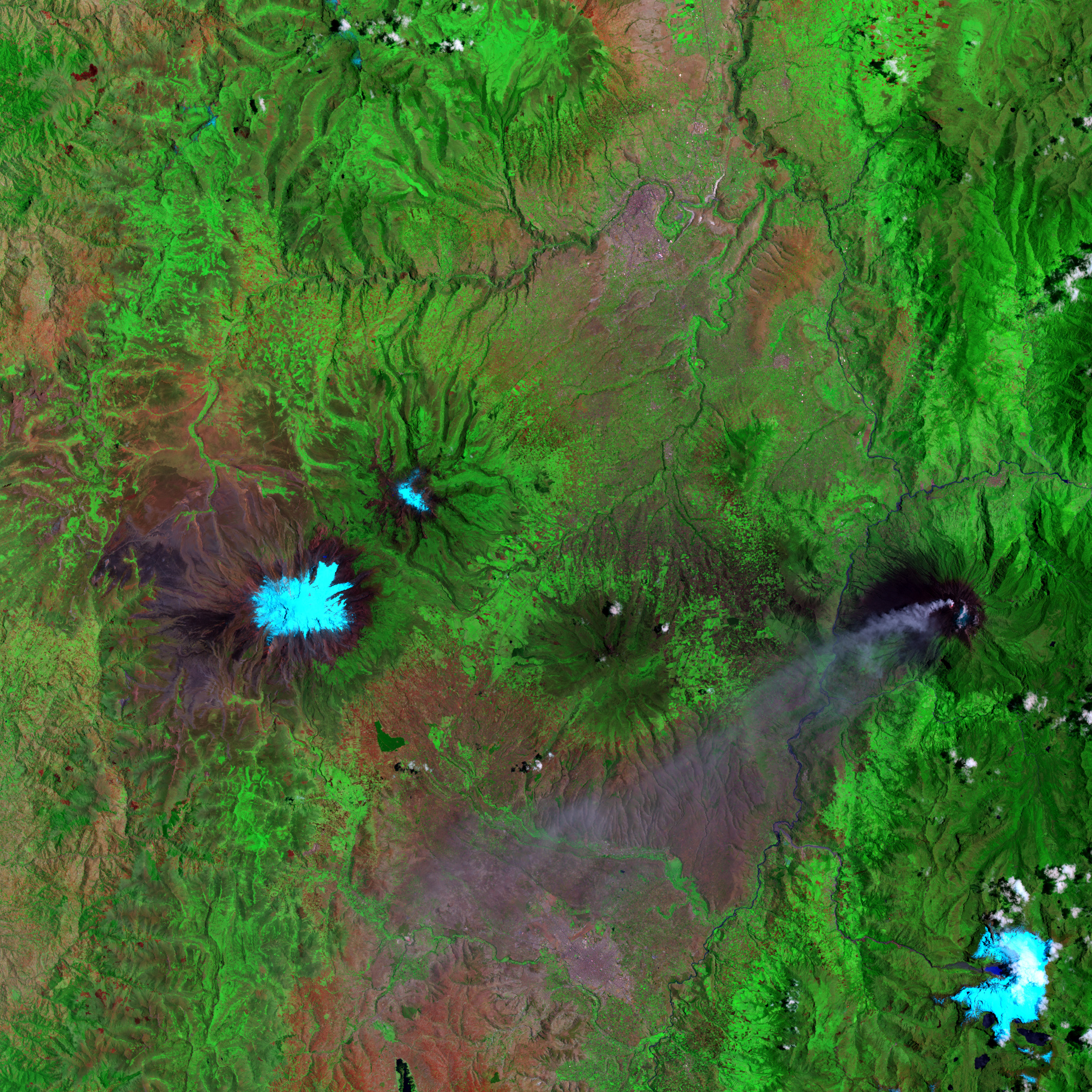
False-color satellite image of Tungurahua (center right, with plume of ash emanating from it) and its neighbor Chimborazo (center left)

Tungurahua (/tʊŋɡʊˈrɑːwə/; from Quichua language tunguri (throat) and rahua (fire), "Throat of Fire") is an active stratovolcano located in the Cordillera Oriental of Ecuador. The volcano gives its name to the province of Tungurahua. Volcanic activity restarted on August 19, 1999, and is ongoing as of 2023, with several eruptive episodes since then, the most recent lasting from February 26 to March 16, 2016.

== Etymology ==
According to one theory the name Tungurahua is a combination of the Quichua language tunguri (throat) and rahua (fire) meaning "Throat of Fire". According to another theory it is based on the Quichua uraua for crater. Tungurahua is also known as "The Black Giant" (Gigante Negro in Spanish), and in local indigenous mythology it is referred to as Mama Tungurahua ("Mother Tungurahua").

== Geography and geology ==
Major volcanoes in Ecuador

=== Location ===
Tungurahua 5,023 metres (16,480 ft) is located in the Cordillera Oriental of the Andes of central Ecuador, 140 kilometres (87 mi) south of the capital Quito. Nearby notable mountains are Chimborazo (6,263 metres (20,548 ft)) and El Altar (5,319 metres (17,451 ft)). It rises above the small thermal springs town of Baños de Agua Santa (1,800 metres (5,900 ft)) which is located at its foot 8 kilometres (5.0 mi) to the north. Other nearby towns are Ambato (30 kilometres (19 mi) to the northwest) and Riobamba (30 kilometres (19 mi) to the southwest). Tungurahua is part of the Sangay National Park.

=== Glacier ===
With its elevation of 5,023 metres (16,480 ft), Tungurahua just over tops the snow line (about 4,900 metres (16,100 ft)). Tungurahua's top is snow-covered and did feature a small summit glacier which melted away after the increase of volcanic activity in 1999.

=== Volcanism ===
Today's volcanic edifice (Tungurahua III) is constructed inside its predecessor's (Tungurahua II) caldera which collapsed about 3000 (±90) years ago. The original edifice (Tungurahua I) collapsed at the end of the Late Pleistocene.

==== Historical volcanic activity ====
Tungurahua's eruptions are Strombolian. They produce andesite and dacite. All historical eruptions originated from the summit crater and have been accompanied by strong explosions, pyroclastic flows and sometimes lava flows. In the last 1,300 years Tungurahua entered every 80 to 100 years into an activity phase of which the major have been the ones of 1773, 1886 and 1916–1918.

Study of volcanic ash layers deposited in the lakes of El Cajas National Park show that there were major eruptions 3,034±621, 2,027±41, 1,557±177, 733±112 years ago (cal BP).

==== Recent volcanic activity ====
In 1999, after a long period of quiescence, the volcano entered an eruptive phase that continued until 2017. The renewed activity in October 1999 produced major ashfall and led to the temporary evacuation of more than 25,000 inhabitants from Baños and the surrounding area Activity continued at a medium level until May 2006, when activity increased dramatically, culminating in violent eruptions on 14 July 2006 and 16 August 2006. The 16 August 2006 eruption has been the most violent since activity commenced in 1999. This eruption was accompanied by a 10 kilometres (6.2 mi) high ash plume which spread over an area of 740 by 180 kilometres (460 by 110 mi), depositing ash and tephra to the southwest of the volcano. Several pyroclastic flows were generated that killed at least five people, and destroyed a number of hamlets and roads on the eastern and northwestern slopes of the volcano.

A further eruption and evacuation occurred on 4 December 2010. Ecuador's National Agency of Risk Control issued a "red alert", later downgraded to orange. The Ecuadorean Institute for Geophysics reported a rapid increase in seismic activity, a number of explosions and an ash cloud reaching 2 kilometres (1.2 mi) in height. Another eruption occurred on 18 December 2012 forcing evacuation of those living on the volcano's slopes. The volcano erupted again in July 2013, and again on 1 February 2014.

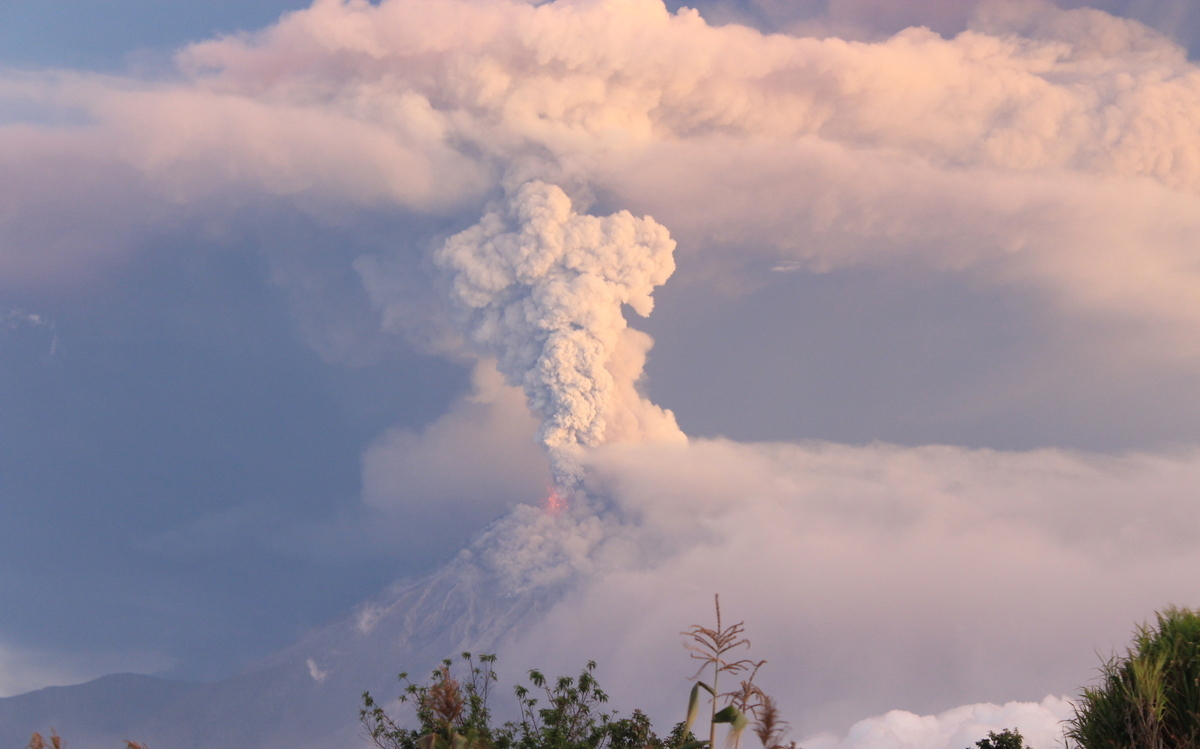
Tungurahua eruption
February 1, 2014

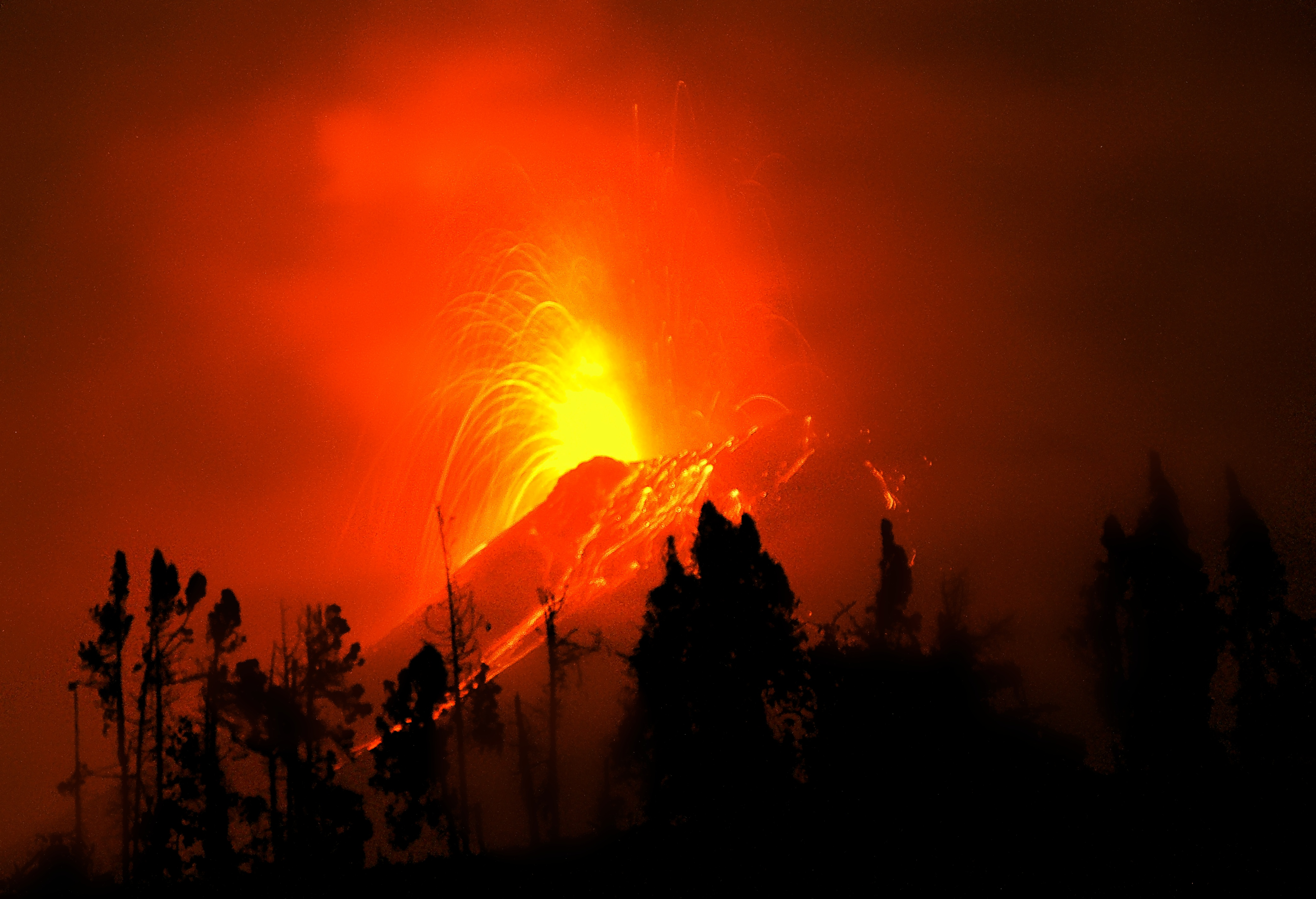
Tungurahua at night
2011

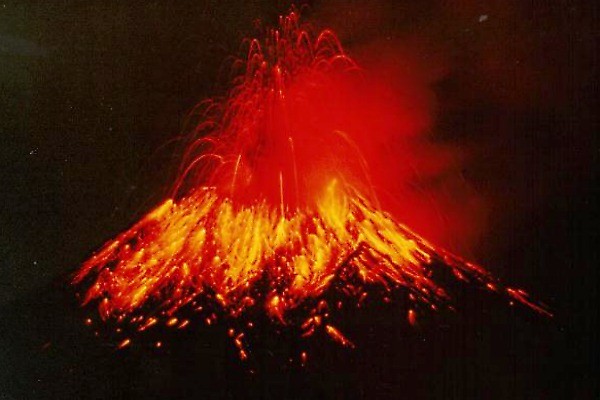
Tungurahua spews hot lava and ash at night, 1999

== First ascent ==
In June 1802, the Prussian-born explorer Alexander von Humboldt tried without success to reach the summit. During their seven-year-long South America expedition (1868 to 1876), the German volcanologists Alphons Stübel and Wilhelm Reiss climbed Cotopaxi (Reiss with Angel Escobar; 28 November 1872) and Tungurahua (Stübel with Eusebio Rodríguez; 9 February 1873).

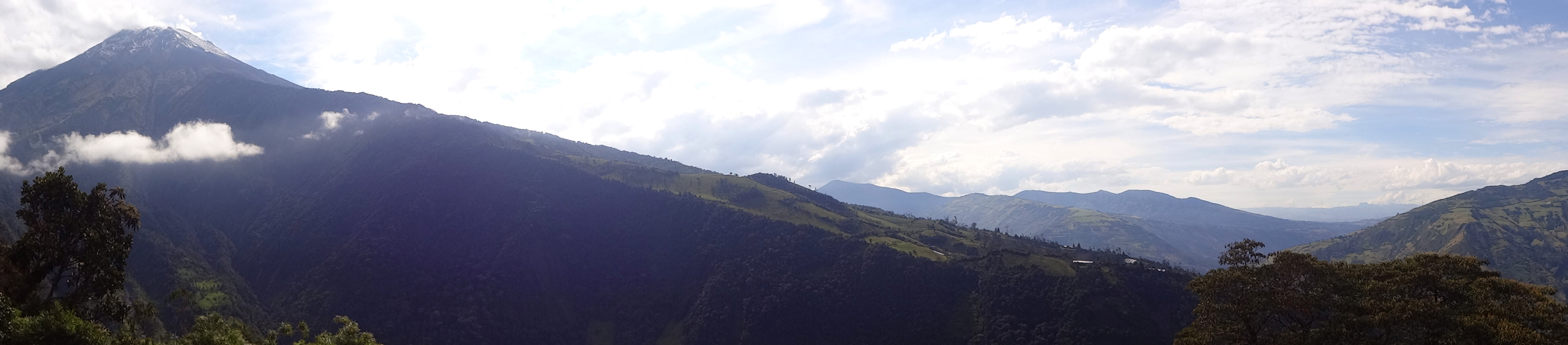
Panorama of Tungurahua from Baños, one week before the 2012 eruptions

== See also ==
- Lists of volcanoes
  - List of volcanoes in Ecuador
  - List of stratovolcanoes
