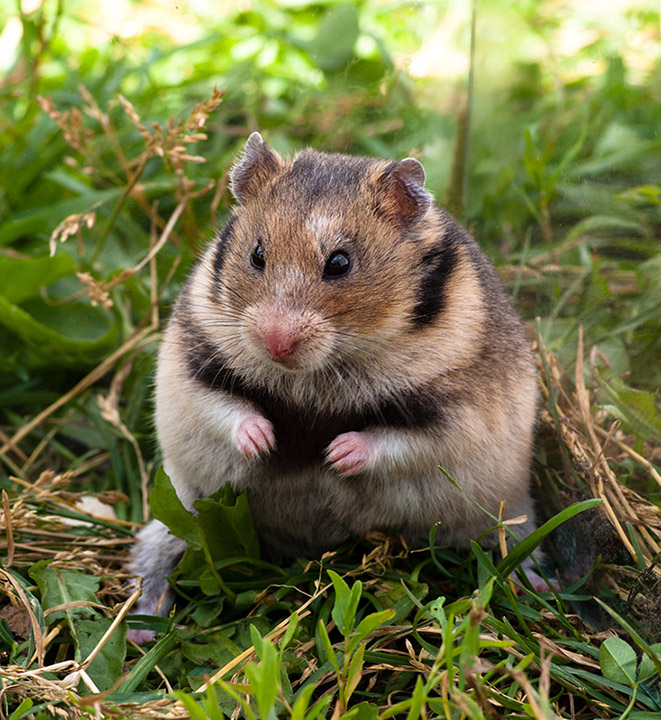
- Turkish hamster (Mesocricetus brandti)
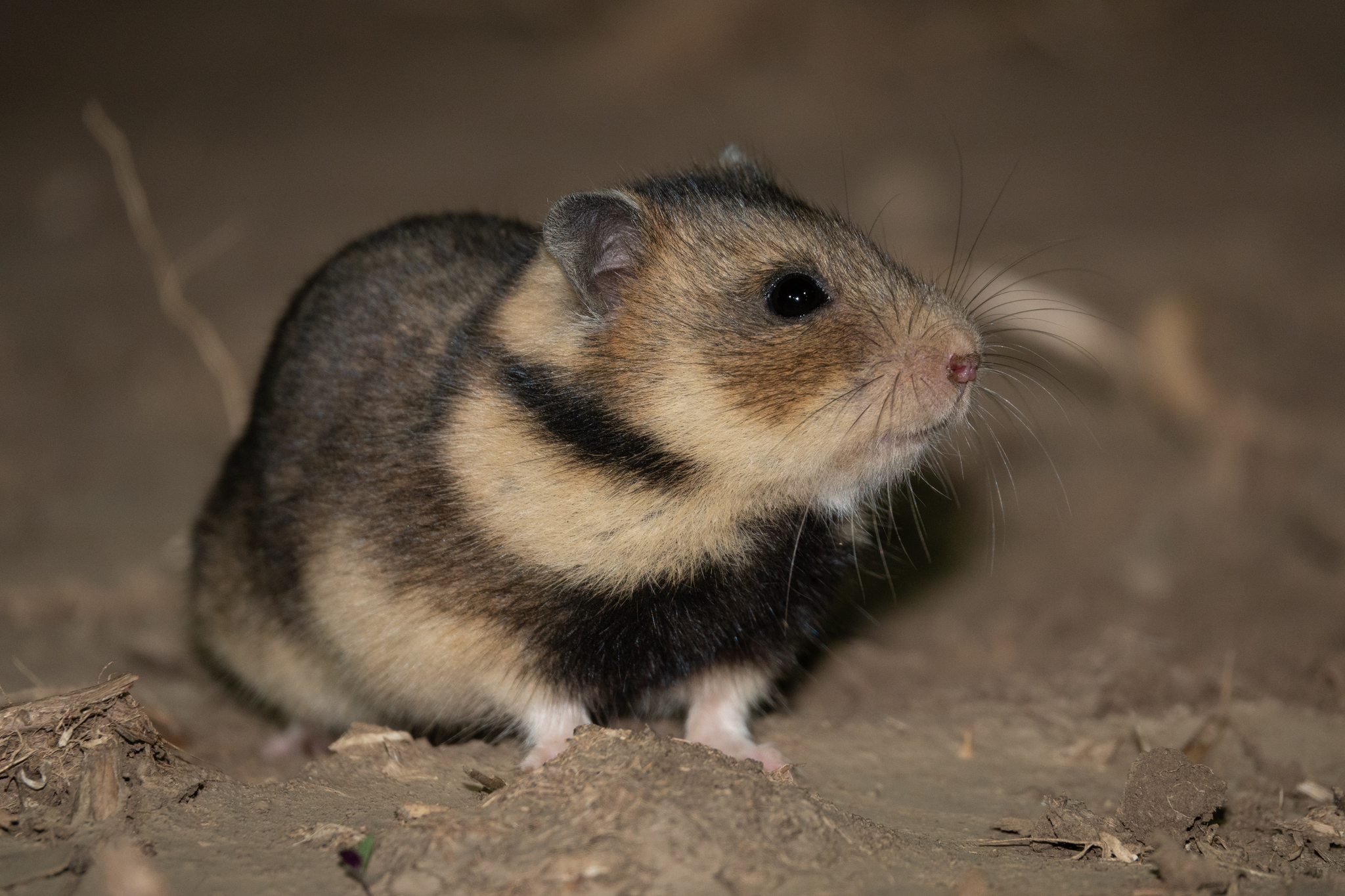
- Romanian hamster (Mesocricetus newtoni)

Scientific classification
- Kingdom: Animalia
- Phylum: Chordata
- Class: Mammalia
- Infraclass: Placentalia
- Order: Rodentia
- Family: Cricetidae
- Subfamily: Cricetinae
- Genus: Mesocricetus; Nehring, 1894

Type species
- Cricetus nigricans Brandt, 1832 (= Cricetus raddei Nehring, 1894)

Species
- Mesocricetus auratus Mesocricetus brandti Mesocricetus newtoni Mesocricetus raddei

= Mesocricetus =

Mesocricetus Temporal range: Early Pliocene - Recent

Genus of Old World hamsters

Mesocricetus is a genus of Old World hamsters, including the Syrian or golden hamster, the first hamster to be introduced as a domestic pet, and still the most popular species of hamster for that purpose.

Recent research has shown that, unlike almost all other land mammals studied, all species of this genus lack the capacity for color vision.

== Species ==
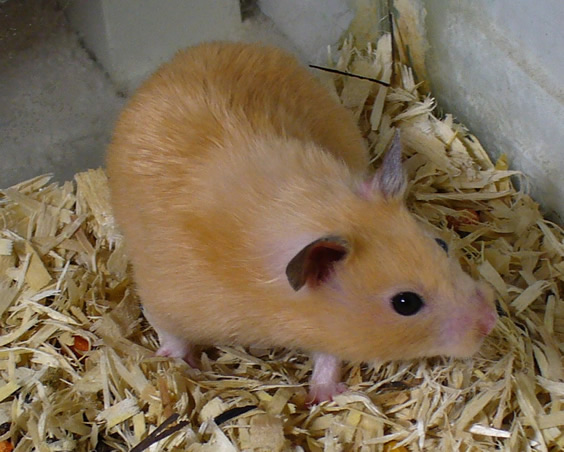
Golden hamster (Mesocricetus auratus)

- Mesocricetus auratus Golden hamster or Syrian hamster
- Mesocricetus brandti Turkish hamster or Brandt's hamster
- Mesocricetus newtoni Romanian hamster or Dobrudja hamster
- Mesocricetus raddei Ciscaucasian hamster
- †Mesocricetus rathgeberi Armathia hamster (extinct, known from subfossil bones from Armathia Island, Greece)
