= Ciscaucasian hamster =

Conservation status
- Least Concern (IUCN 3.1)

Scientific classification
- Kingdom: Animalia
- Phylum: Chordata
- Class: Mammalia
- Infraclass: Placentalia
- Order: Rodentia
- Family: Cricetidae
- Subfamily: Cricetinae
- Genus: Mesocricetus
- Species: M. raddei

Binomial name
- Mesocricetus raddei (Nehring, 1894)

Synonyms
- Cricetus nigricans (Brandt, 1832); Cricetus raddei Nehring, 1894; Mesocricetus nigriculus Nehring, 1898; Mesocricetus raddei avaricus Ognev & Heptner, 1927

Species of rodent

The Ciscaucasian hamster (Mesocricetus raddei) is a species of rodent in the family Cricetidae. It is also known as the Georgian hamster and is found only in Georgia and Russia. The scientific name of this species honors the German naturalist Gustav Radde.

== Distribution and habitat ==
This hamster occurs on the northern slopes of the Caucasus and Ciscaucasia, between Dagestan, the Don River and the Sea of Azov. It is also known from a single record in Georgia. It appears to be extending its range north and north-westwards in its plains habitats but in the mountains the population remains stable. It is found in grassy steppes and also mountain steppes at elevations from 1600 to 2300 m above sea level. It favours pasture and cultivated land and also occurs in belts of trees and rough grass between fields but not in dense woodland.

== Morphology and biology ==
Hamsters of the species found in mountainous regions are larger than the ones found on the plains. They are about 28 cm (11 in) long with a short tail, 1.5 cm (0.59 in) long. They are yellowish-brown above with creamy white throat and underparts and a black ventral region. There are two broad black stripes at the shoulder and the ears are large and rounded. This hamster is considered an agricultural pest. It is mainly nocturnal, emerging at dusk to feed on grasses and herbs in spring and early summer, and on seeds, crops and roots in the autumn. The burrow is extensive and has several exits in the mountain subspecies but only one on the plains. Large stores of food (up to 16 kg (35 lb)) are laid up in the autumn before hibernation which lasts for four to six months depending on the temperature and altitude. This food is mostly eaten in the spring upon emergence from hibernation. In the mountains there are two generations each year but on the plains there may be three or four. Litter size is up to twenty and averages about twelve. This fecundity means that the species can recover quickly after harsh winters and the population size is subject to considerable fluctuations.

== Economic significance ==
In some years M. raddei becomes a considerable pest of agricultural crops. It can damage cereals and perennial grasses, disrupt potato plantings, melon fields and vegetable gardens. Close to the burrow the vegetation may be completely destroyed. It is sometimes trapped for its fur.
