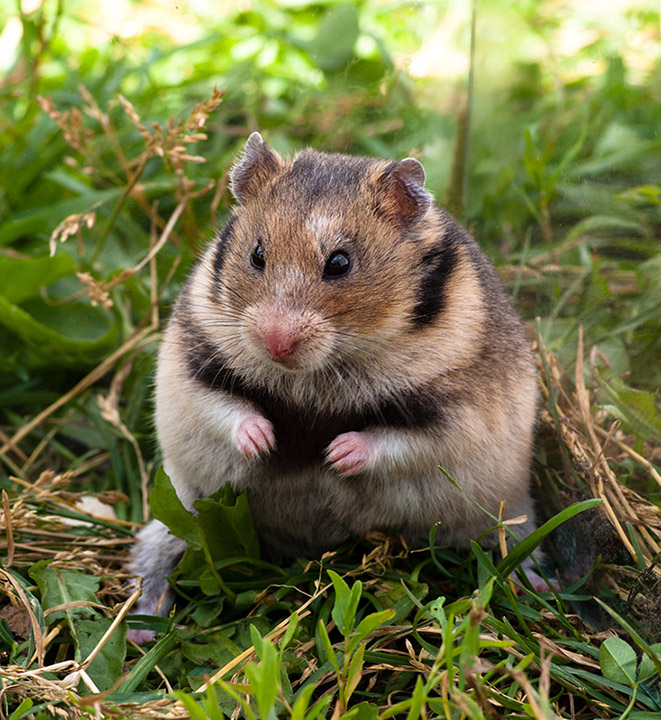

Conservation status
- Near Threatened (IUCN 3.1)

Scientific classification
- Kingdom: Animalia
- Phylum: Chordata
- Class: Mammalia
- Infraclass: Placentalia
- Order: Rodentia
- Family: Cricetidae
- Subfamily: Cricetinae
- Genus: Mesocricetus
- Species: M. brandti

Binomial name
- Mesocricetus brandti (Nehring, 1898)

Synonyms
- Cricetus brandti Nehring, 1898

= Turkish hamster =

Species of mammal

The Turkish hamster (Mesocricetus brandti), also referred to as Brandt's hamster, Azerbaijani hamster, or avurtlak, is a species of hamster native to Turkey, Azerbaijan and other surrounding nations. The Turkish hamster, first catalogued in 1878, is a fairly close relative of the Syrian or golden hamster, though far less is known about it, and it is rarely kept as a pet. The population of the Turkish hamster is said to be declining in the wild, yet this hamster is often used in laboratory testing. Turkish hamsters have lifespans of about two years and are solitary, nocturnal animals, which hibernate. They are reported to be more aggressive than other members of the family Cricetidae. They are tan and dark, sandy brown in color. Like all hamsters, the Turkish hamster has cheek pouches that allow it to carry large amounts of food at one time.

It is named after Johann Friedrich von Brandt, a German-born Russian zoologist and first Director of the Zoological Museum of the Academy of Science in St. Petersburg.

== Habitat and behavior ==
Hamsters are found in the wild throughout Europe and Asia and are considered to be extremely adaptable, living in scrublands, sand dunes, desert steppes and farmlands. The land where the Turkish hamster lives is extremely dry and open, with fairly little vegetation aside from grasses. Turkish hamsters usually live between 1,000 and 2,200 meters above sea level. This hamster burrows in the ground for shelter, and its burrows can be 20 inches to 6 feet below the ground surface. These burrows are complex, consisting of several tunnels leading to separate cells for nesting, food, and waste. Turkish hamster burrows are well-enough equipped for the hamsters to hibernate for four to 10 months (though sources do differ on this point), sometimes sleeping for 30 days at a time, though usually waking weekly for a day or two of activity.

== Diet ==
Turkish hamsters have fairly varied diets, subsisting primarily on grains and herbs. They do eat insects on occasion and store roots and leaves in their burrows for hibernation. As Turkish hamsters often live near and among farmlands, they often eat human crops and are considered a pest.

== Population and endangerment ==
The Turkish hamster is a rare species, but is the most widespread of the family Cricetidae. Its ability to live in a variety of environments means the Turkish hamster often lives on farmlands, and is viewed as and controlled as an agricultural pest. In 1996, the Turkish hamster was categorized as an animal with the lowest risk of extinction, but due to cases of direct poisoning by farmers, it is now near threatened. More data are needed to understand the population decline.

== Reproduction ==
Turkish hamsters are weaned from their mothers after three weeks of nursing. After eight weeks of age, females are sexually mature, but males do not mature until six months of age. According to iucnredlist.org, Turkish hamsters have two to four litters of young per year, with four to 20 young per litter, averaging 10. Petwebsite.com differs on this point, arguing the litter size is between one and 13 young, with an average of 6. The gestation lasts from 14 to 15 days, or 16–17 days. The two main breeding seasons are spring and fall, when daylength is about 15–17 hours per day.

== Relationship to other hamsters ==
Turkish hamsters are most closely related to the Syrian or golden hamster. The Turkish hamster is considered to be the more aggressive of the two, but this could be because the other species has been domesticated.

== Domestic pets ==
Turkish hamsters are kept as a pet by some. Hamsters are aggressive by nature and these hamsters are recent pet species, yet this species is still improving. The domestication of the hamster was a fairly recent development; in 1930, a family of Syrian hamsters was domesticated, and this was the first instance of hamster domestication in history. Since then, only five of the 18 species of hamster— Campbell's dwarf hamster, the Djungarian hamster, the Roborovski hamster, the golden hamster, and the Chinese hamster—have been domesticated and are sold in pet shops. Turkish hamsters are often used in laboratory experiments.
