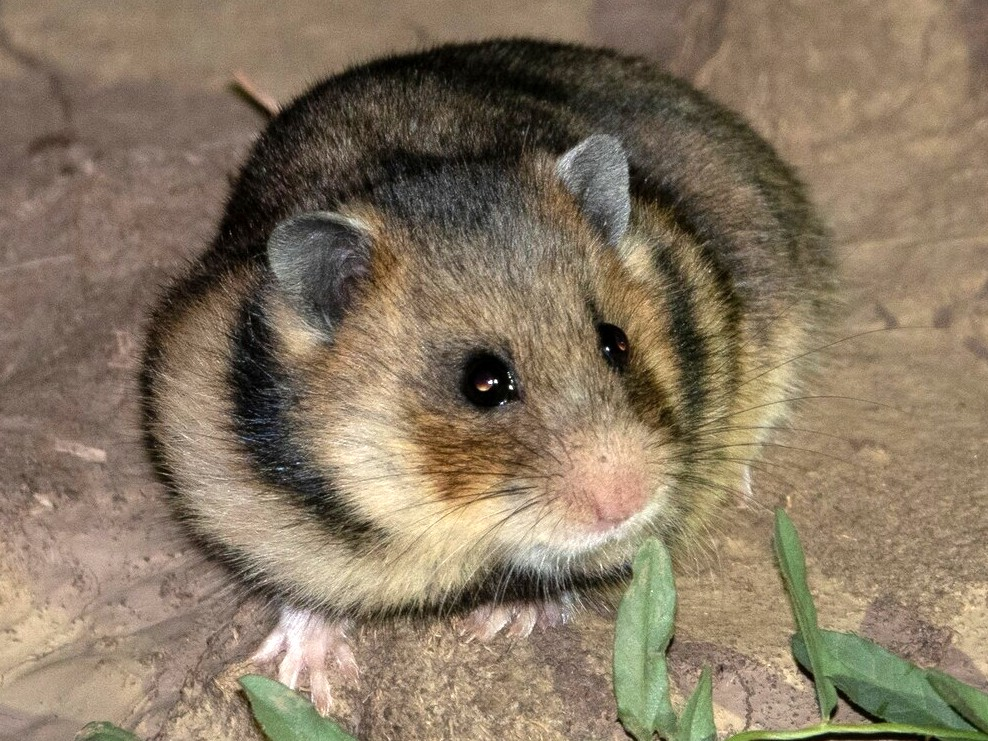

Conservation status
- Near Threatened (IUCN 3.1)

Scientific classification
- Kingdom: Animalia
- Phylum: Chordata
- Class: Mammalia
- Infraclass: Placentalia
- Order: Rodentia
- Family: Cricetidae
- Subfamily: Cricetinae
- Genus: Mesocricetus
- Species: M. newtoni

Binomial name
- Mesocricetus newtoni (Nehring, 1898)

Synonyms
- Cricetus newtoni Nehring, 1898

= Romanian hamster =

Species of rodent

The Romanian hamster or Dobrudja hamster (Mesocricetus newtoni) is a species of rodent in the family Cricetidae. It is found in Bulgaria and Romania. The scientific name honors the British ornithologist Alfred Newton, who had published a short description and an illustration of this species in 1870 without knowing it to be a valid species.

== Description ==
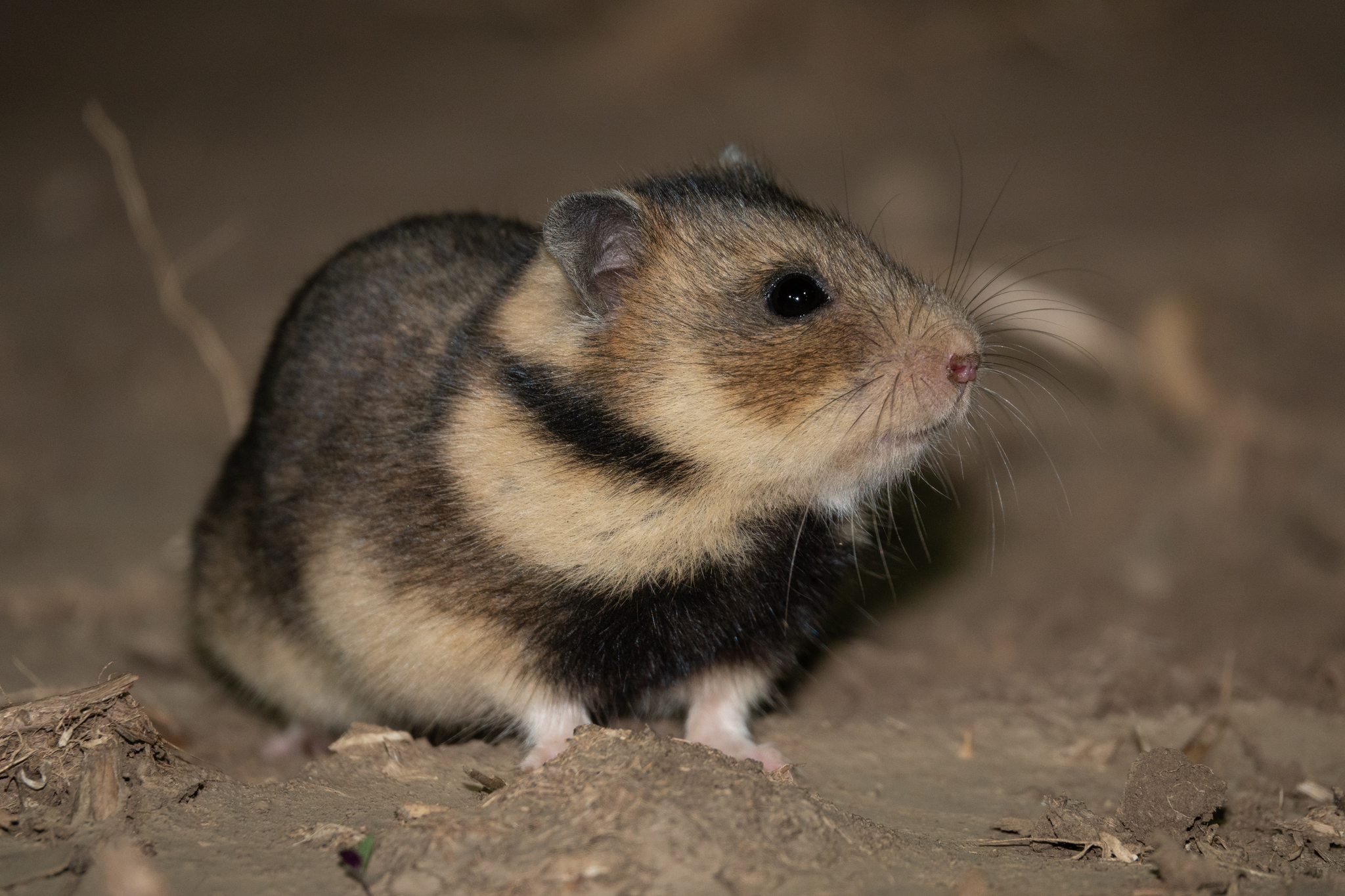
Specimen observed in Romania

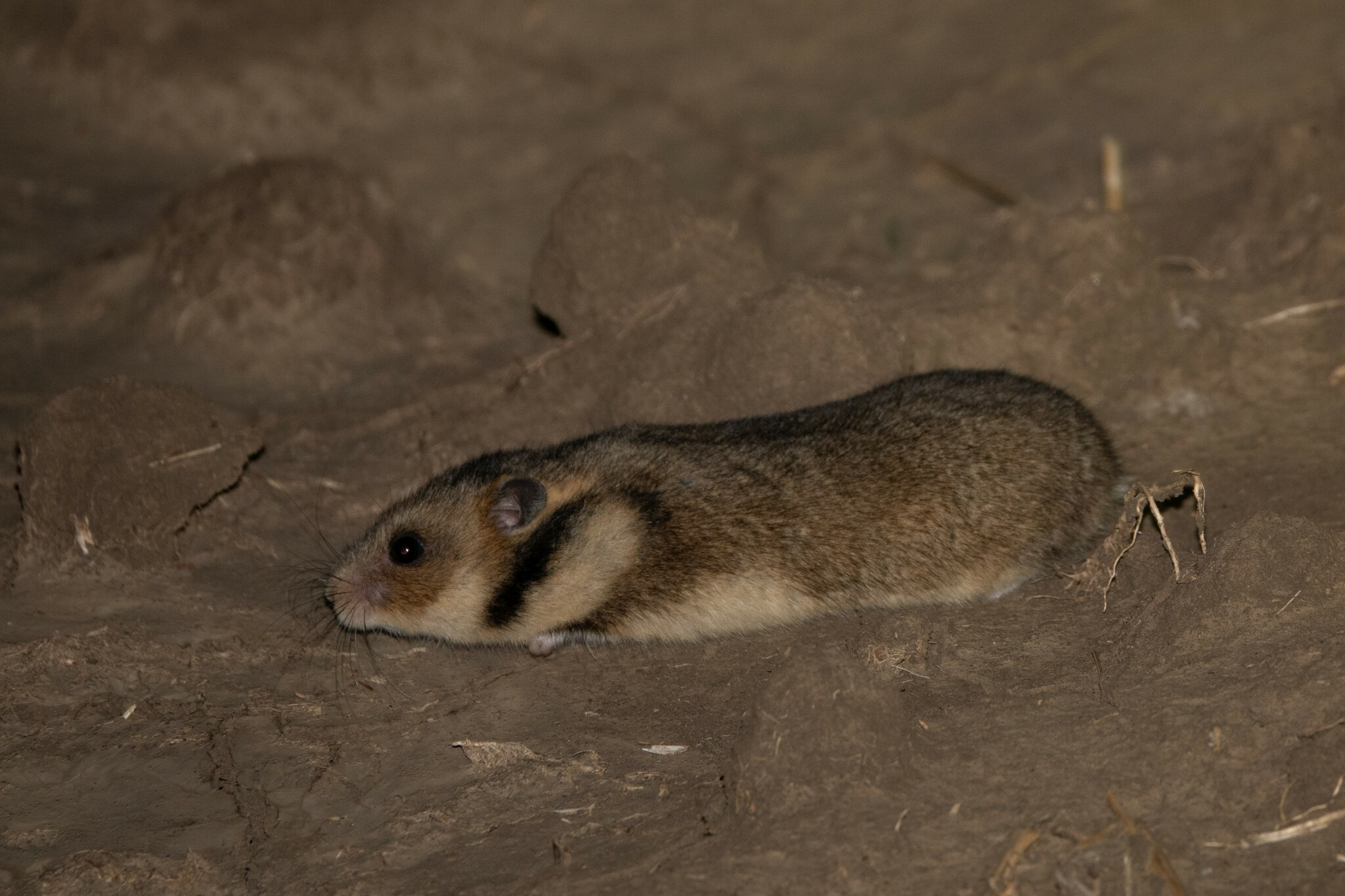
Individual observed in Romania

The Romanian hamster has brown dorsal (back) fur and a white underside. The top of the head has a dark stripe that extends to the neck. The dark cheek stripes extend back to the shoulder. Its head-body length is up to 180 mm (7 in) and its weight ranges from 80 to 115 g (3–4 oz). Its dental formula is 1.0.0.31.0.0.3.

This species is primarily found in steppic, uncultivated xerophilous landscapes of South-Eastern Romania's and North-Eastern Bulgaria's Dobruja region, often inhabiting lowlands along the right bank of the Danube River, while occasionally venturing into cultivated lands such as alfalfa fields and corn cultures.

== Behavior ==
Closely related to the well-known Syrian hamster, the Romanian hamster is a species known for its nocturnal or crepuscular behavior, meaning it is most active during the night or twilight hours. These hamsters lead a solitary lifestyle, meeting primarily for mating purposes, and are known for their intricate burrow systems, which serve as both shelter and storage for food.

Like all other hamster species, the Romanian hamster is omnivorous. Despite primarily consuming plant-based foods, such as cereals, seeds, legumes, rooted vegetables, fruits, and grasses, they have also been observed consuming invertebrates and occasionally small animals, such as mice and small birds, expanding their dietary range. In captivity, they display preferences for certain seeds, such as those with round shapes like cockle or corn, while avoiding others like wheat, with oats being entirely abandoned.

Romanian hamsters exhibit distinct food storage behaviors, with males being primarily responsible for food deposits, storing up to 800 grams of food. In contrast, females prioritize nursing their pups and store only small quantities of food, if any. While they can carry up to 20 grams of food in their cheek pouches, laboratory studies suggest a daily consumption of only about 10–15 grams of food. This storage behavior serves as a crucial survival strategy for Romanian hamsters to evade predators and navigate challenging environmental conditions. By stockpiling food, they gain more freedom from foraging, particularly beneficial during periods of scarcity or adverse weather.

Reaching sexual maturity at a relatively young age, typically between 56 and 70 days old, Romanian hamsters engage in breeding from early April to August. Gestation lasts approximately 15 days, with litters ranging from 1 to 12 pups. The mother plays a vital role in nurturing the pups during the three-week weaning period following birth.

Communication among Romanian hamsters primarily involves squeaking sounds and ultrasonic vocalizations, which facilitate social interaction and territory marking. Flank marking, where both sexes rub their scent glands against objects, serves as a means of communication and territorial assertion.
