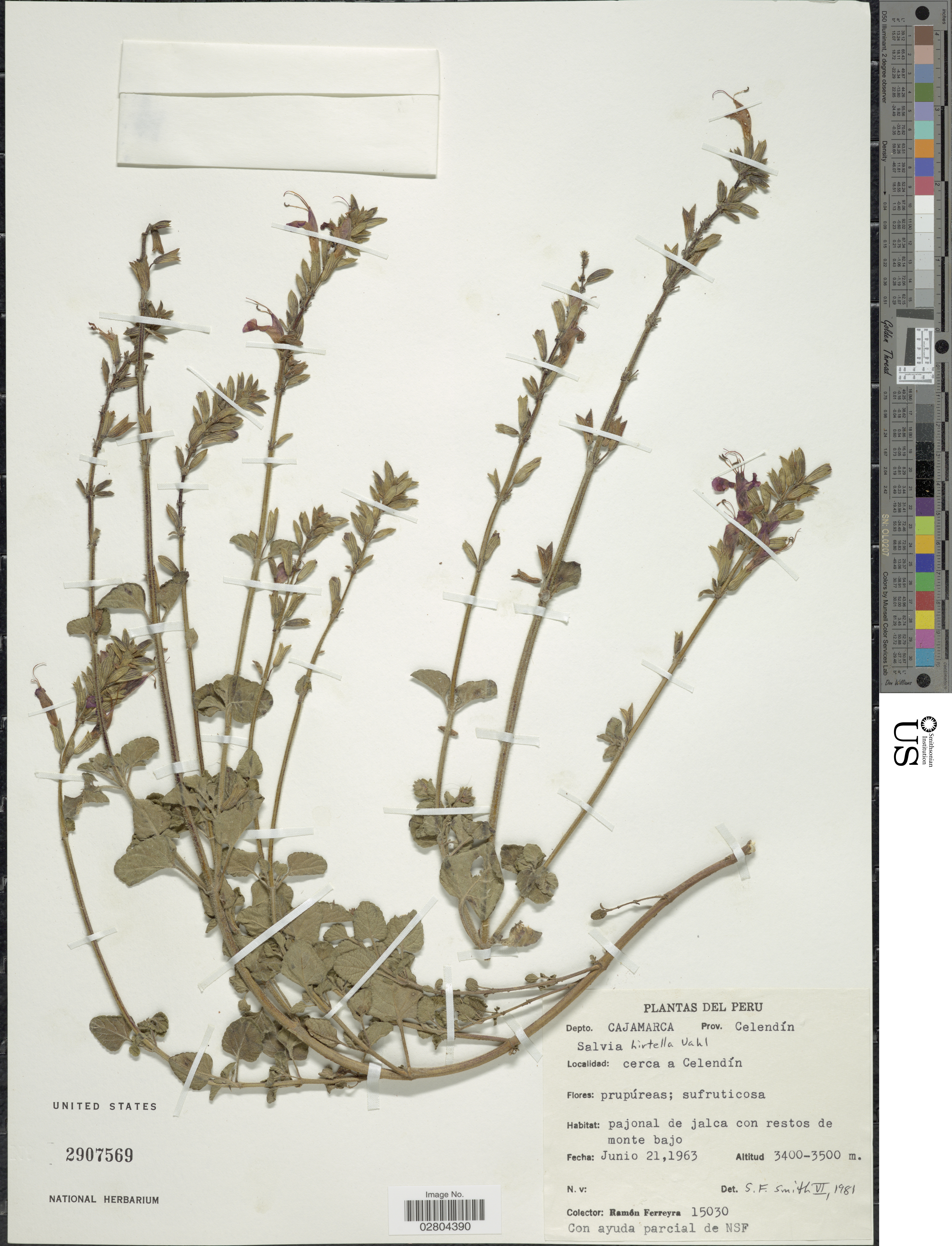

Scientific classification
- Kingdom: Plantae
- Clade: Tracheophytes
- Clade: Angiosperms
- Clade: Eudicots
- Clade: Asterids
- Order: Lamiales
- Family: Lamiaceae
- Genus: Salvia
- Species: S. hirtella

Binomial name
- Salvia hirtella Vahl

= Salvia hirtella =

Species of shrub

Salvia hirtella is a species of flowering plant in the sage/mint family Lamiaceae, native to the Ecuadorian province of Cotopaxi, found both north and south of the equator. Its native habitat is limited to higher altitudes in the Andes mountains, with most plants collected around 12,000 ft (3,700 m) elevation.

Salvia hirtella is an evergreen branching shrub that reaches 2 ft (0.61 m) high in cultivation, rooting at the nodes when branches and inflorescences become heavy and bend to the ground. It has glossy, triangular grass-green leaves that are graduated in size, averaging about 2 in (5.1 cm) wide and long. The flowers are rich orange-red, 1.5 in (3.8 cm) long, growing in whorls of twelve on a 1 ft (0.30 m) inflorescence. The calyx and the inflorescence stem are covered in dark purple hairs with glands, justifying its Latin specific epithet hirtella (hairy), with the calyces remaining long after blooming.
