= Karl von Fritsch =

German geologist and paleontologist

Karl Wilhelm Georg von Fritsch (11 November 1838 in Weimar – 9 January 1906) was a German geologist and paleontologist.

He studied forestry at the academy in Eisenach, followed by studies in natural sciences at the University of Göttingen, where he obtained his degree in 1862. Following graduation, he embarked on a scientific journey to Madeira and the Canary Islands. In 1863 he received his habilitation at Zurich, working as a lecturer at the "Polytechnikum". While in Zurich, he produced an accurate geological map of the Saint-Gotthard Massif. In 1867 he relocated to the Senckenberg Nature Research Society in Frankfurt as a geologist and mineralogist.

In 1873 he was appointed professor of geology at the University of Halle, followed by a full professorship the following year. At Halle, he occupied himself with paleobotanical research, and in the process amassed an impressive collection of fossil plants. He also conducted studies of coal deposits in the Saale valley, as well as scientific investigations of salt deposits west of Halle.

In 1877 he became a member of the German Academy of Sciences Leopoldina, becoming its president in 1895 as successor to Hermann Knoblauch (1820–1895).

== Selected written works ==
- Reisebilder von den Canarischen inseln, 1867 - Travel pictures of the Canary Islands.
- "Santorin. The Kaimeni Islands from observations", (with Wilhelm Reiss and Alphons Stübel) published in English in 1867.
- Geologische beschreibung der insel Tenerife : Ein beitrag zur kenntniss vulkanischer gebirge. (with Wilhelm Reiss), 1868 - Geological representation of Tenerife. A contribution to the knowledge of volcanic mountains.
- Geologische Beschreibung des Ringgebirges von Santorin, 1871 - Geological description of the "Ring mountains" of Santorini.
- Das St. Gotthardgebirge mit einer geologischen karte und 4 tafeln von Karl von Fritsch, 1873 - The St. Gotthard mountain range with a geological map and four panels by Karl von Fritsch.
- Geognostische Karte des Sanct Gotthard, 1873 - Geognostic map of Sanct Gotthard.
- Beitrag zur kenntnis der tierwelt der deutschen Trias, 1902 - Contribution to the knowledge of wildlife during the German Triassic.
- Über die ostatlantischen Inselgruppen. In Bericht über die Senckenbergische naturforschende Gesellschaft – 1870: 72 - 113.
