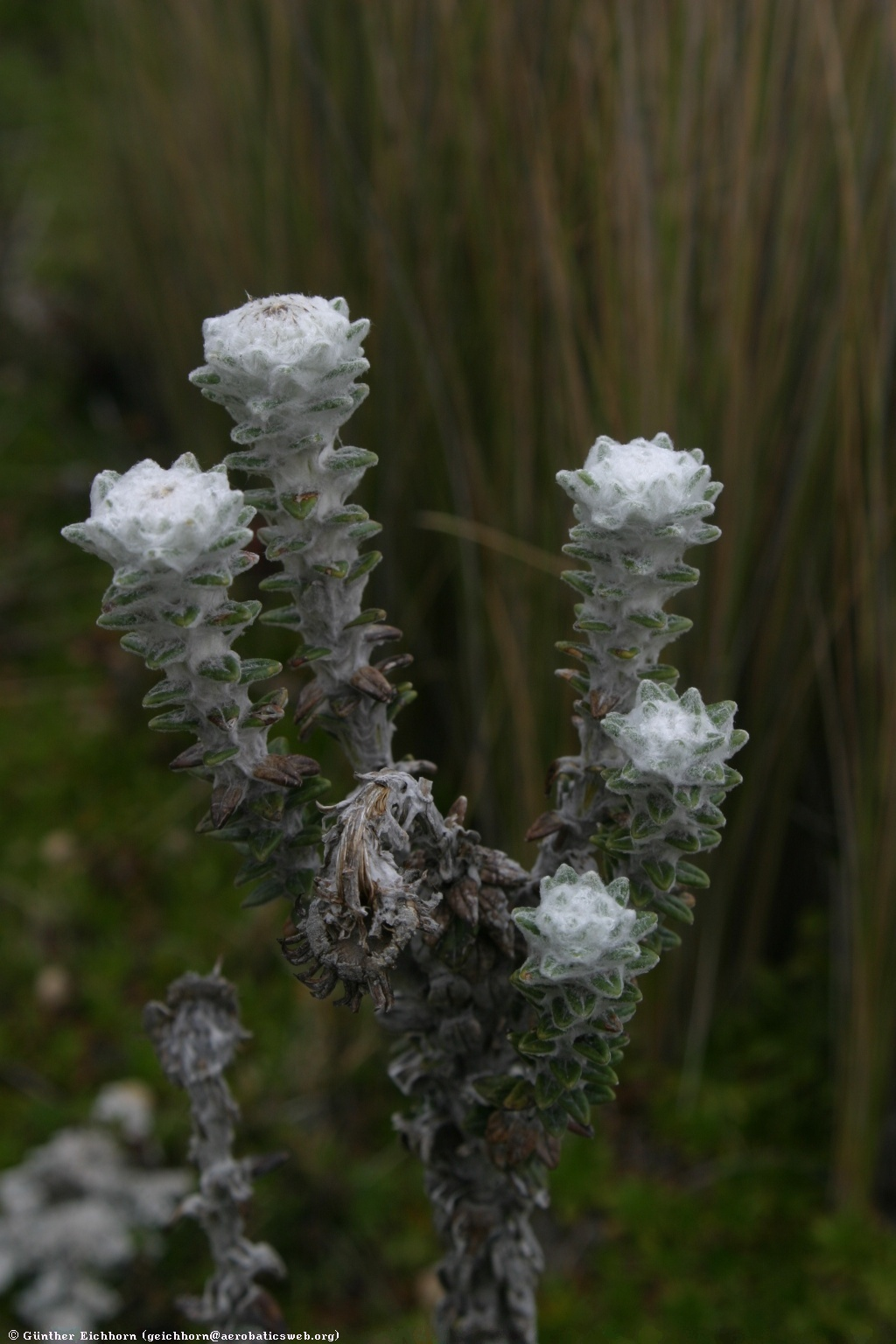
- Lasiocephalus ovatus on Cotopaxi, Ecuador

Scientific classification
- Kingdom: Plantae
- Clade: Tracheophytes
- Clade: Angiosperms
- Clade: Eudicots
- Clade: Asterids
- Order: Asterales
- Family: Asteraceae
- Genus: Lasiocephalus
- Species: L. ovatus

Binomial name
- Lasiocephalus ovatus (Schltdl)

Synonyms
- Senecio superandinus Cuatrec.; Senecio reflexus (Kunth) Cuatrec.; Culcitium reflexum Kunth; Culcitium ovatum (Schltdl.) S.F. Blake; Culcitium uniflorum (Lam.) Hieron.; Gnaphalium uniflorum Lam.

= Lasiocephalus ovatus =

Species of flowering plant

Lasiocephalus ovatus is a terrestrial herb in the high Andes.

== Distribution ==
Colombia (South America) Ecuador (South America).
