= Ancon (archaeological site) =

Archaeological site in Peru

Coordinates: 11.7685°S 77.1664°W

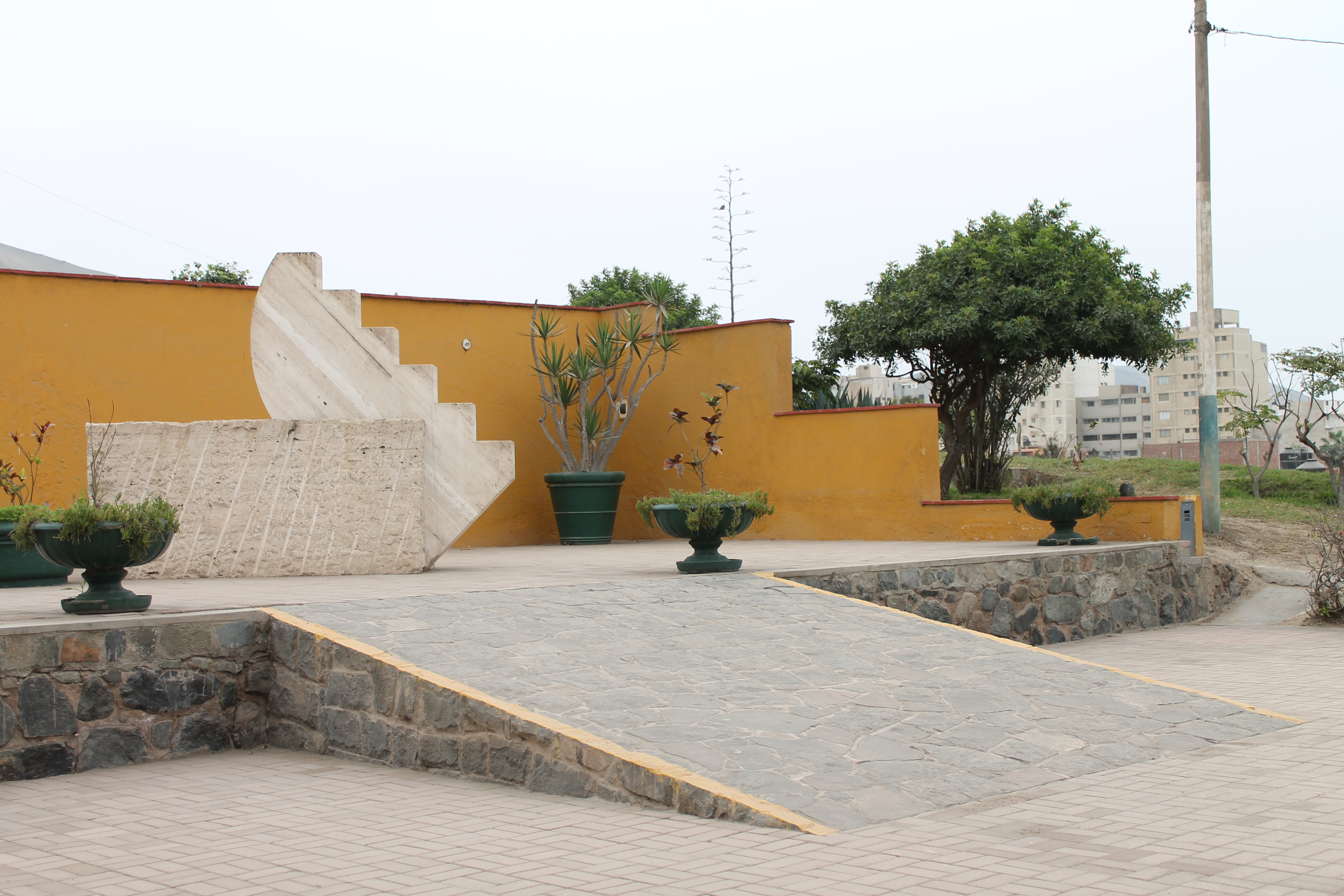
Entrance of the Ancon Site Museum

Ancon is an archaeological site in the north of the Bay of Ancon, in the Ancón District, on the central coast of Peru. It is one of the most important centers of the Peruvian archeology and features a vast necropolis of the pre-Hispanic era, with countless funerary sites. Permanent occupation in Ancon is documented throughout all periods of Andean history. The oldest evidence of human occupation dates back 10,000 years ago to the preceramic period.

== Location ==
The beach resort area of Ancon is located 42 km north of Lima. Historically, it is known as the place where the peace treaty between Peru and Chile (Treaty of Ancón) was signed in 1883.

The archaeological site extends north of the Bay of Ancon and west of the Pan-American Highway.

El Paraíso, Peru is another important site in the area.

== Timeline ==
Ancon is one of the few archaeological sites in the Andean region that boasts an ongoing cultural occupation throughout all periods of history, from the Andean Lithic Period (8000 BC) to the Late Horizon ending with the period of the Incas (1500 AD). The colonial and republican history of Peru is also attested.

== Studies ==
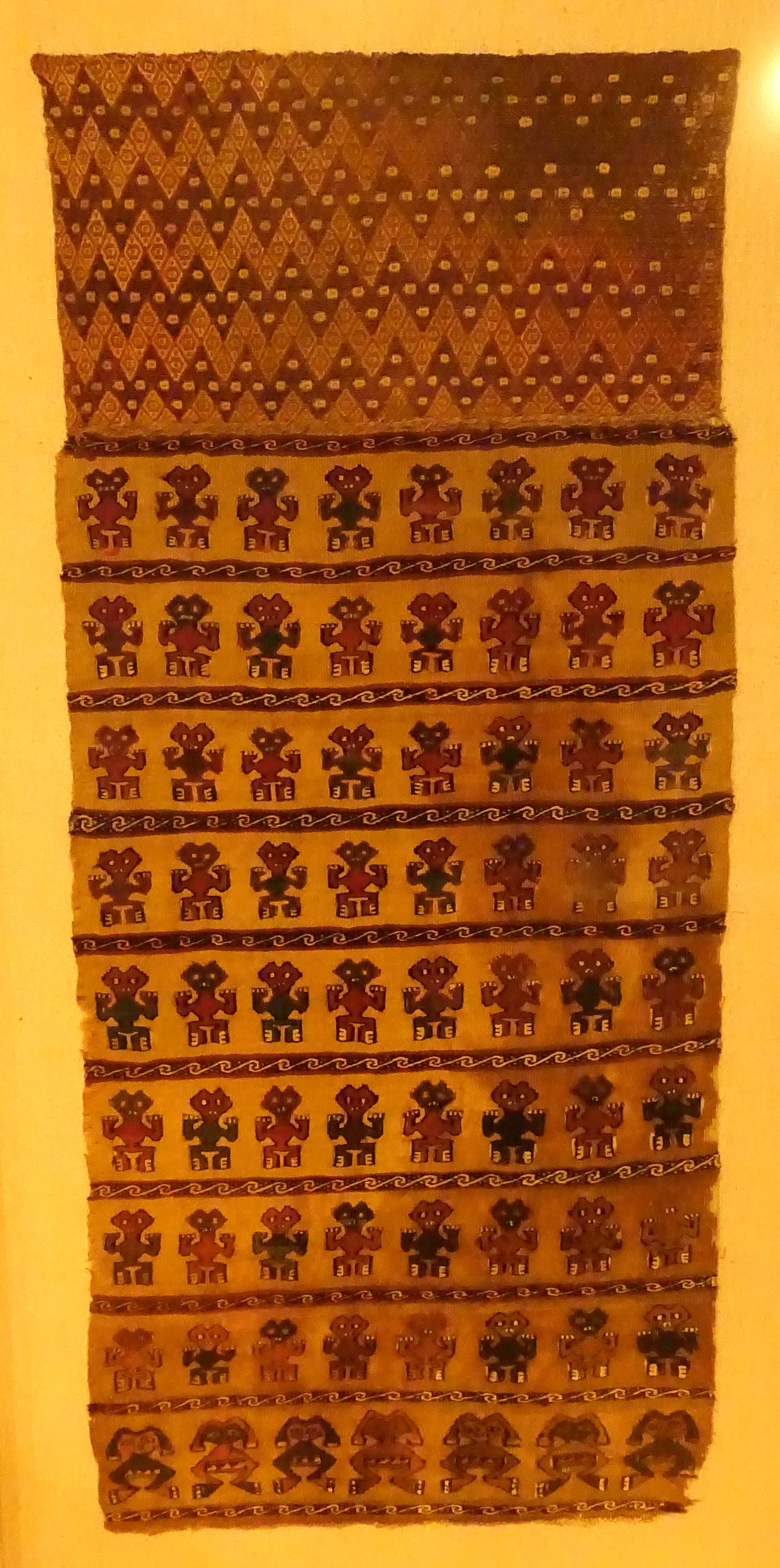
Rectangular tapestry panel with stylized humans, Peru, Central Coast Wari at Ancon, c. 1000-1470 AD, cotton, alpaca wool - Krannert Art Museum, University of Illinois at Urbana-Champaign - Urbana-Champaign, Illinois, USA.

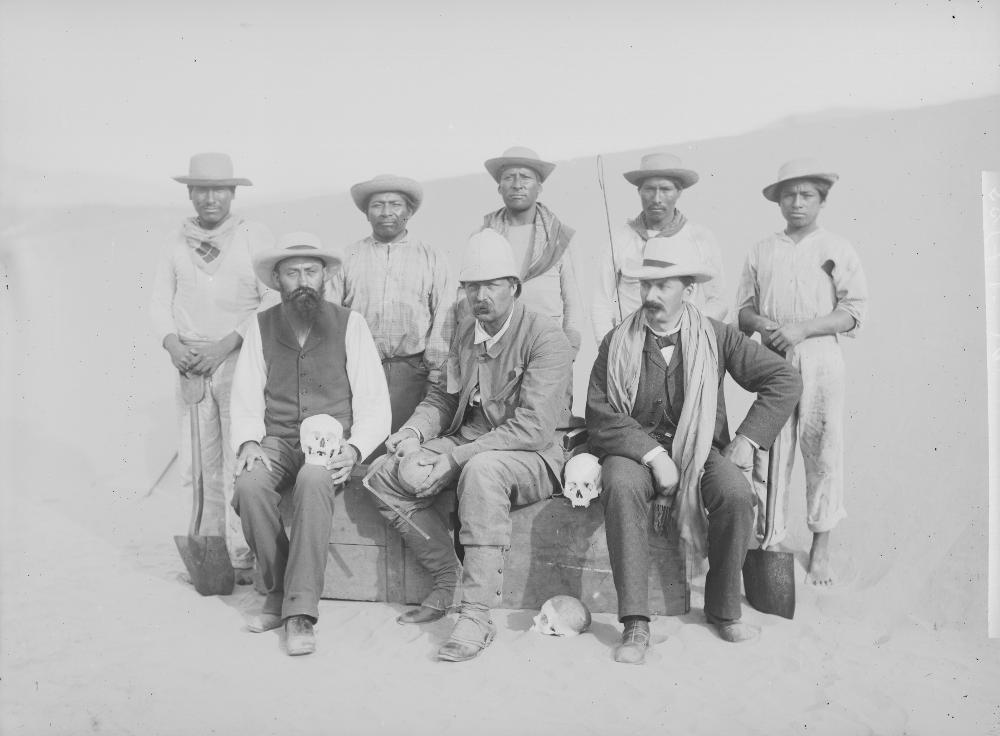
Hjalmar Stolpe in Ancón, Peru, 1884 during the Vanadis expedition.

In 1870, during the construction of the railroad from Ancon to Pasamayo, the first large ancient tombs were discovered here.

In 1875, German scholars Wilhelm Reiss and Alphons Stubel visited in the area, and made several excavations in and around the area of the necropolis. As a result, a three-volume study with good lithographs and drawings were published in Berlin in 1880–1887. The joint work of Reiss and Stubel is considered by some as the precursor of scientific archeology in Peru, although not yet applied stratigraphic methods.

Further research was conducted by Max Uhle (1904) who was the first to record the large shell midden of Las Colinas.

Other archaeologists working on this site include Paul Berthon (1907), and Aleš Hrdlička (1913).

In 1941, Gordon Willey and Marshall T. Newman conducted additional research, including in the area of Las Colinas.

Given the announced development of the area of Miramar, a series of rescue investigations by Julio C. Tello were conducted between 1945 and 1950. Within the framework of this project, an area of 2000m by 200m was investigated, which revealed 1,570 tombs with 14,055 excavated objects. This work was published by Rebeca Carrión Cachot (1951).

Synthesizing the knowledge acquired up to then, Carrion noted the following:

“In Ancon, there are remnants of three distinct periods: (1) a very old period represented by elements of Chavin and sub-Chavin cultures; these are found in the hills of Cerro San Pedro, in the southern part of the bay; (2) an intermediate period represented by elements of the Wari Culture, with local Ancon variations: and (3) the recent period represented by elements of the Chancay and Inca cultures.”

In 1959, Jorge C. Muelle, based on his excavations in Las Colinas area, located a preceramic layer below the Chavin remains, thus moving back the prehistory of Ancon several thousand years.

The archaeologist Federico Kauffmann Doig also worked in the area of Miramar. Also, Peter Kaulicke published a 1997 work on Ancon funerary contexts.

== Description ==
From the archaeological point of view we can distinguish the following areas:

- Ancon I ('Las Colinas' and 'El Tanque'): ancient middens and refuse areas
- Three walls in the western area that Uhle named "Fortaleza".
- Ancon II or Necropolis, also known as 'Miramar'.
- The Air Base
- Cerro Pasamayo
- A series of lithic period camps in the plains/pampas of Ancon and Piedras Gordas.

== Preceramic Ancon ==
The archaeological evidence indicates human presence at Ancon from the lithic period onwards, i.e., from about 10,000 years ago at the pampas of Ancon and Piedras Gordas. Bifacial projectile points of Paijan type were found – the type also present elsewhere along the Peruvian coast.

In the Archaic period, sedentary fishermen and collectors of seafood and shellfish lived in the Bay of Ancon; this is evidenced by the presence of large middens, specifically in the area of Las Colinas.

The arid soil explains the specialization of these peoples in the use of marine resources; nevertheless, they obtained additional resources through the exchange with the agricultural groups further inland.

== Site Museum ==
Opened in 1993, the Ancon Site Museum houses more than 2,500 pieces excavated in the archaeological area, including pottery, textiles and mummies.

== Bibliography ==
(English)

- Harner, Sandra D. (1979) An Early Intermediate Period textile sequence from Ancon, Peru. in: The Junius B. Bird pre-Columbian Textile Conference, May 19 and 20, 1973 / Ann Pollard Rowe, Elizabeth P. Benson, Anne-Louise Schaffer, eds. -- Washington, D.C.: Textile Museum: Dumbarton Oaks. Trustees for Harvard University, p. 151-163 Washington D.C.: Library of Congress
- Lanning, Edward Putnam (1967) Preceramic archaeology of the Ancon-Chillón Region, Central Coast of Peru. [S.l.: s.n.], 1967
- Lanning, Edward Putnam, A pre-agricultural occupation on the central coast of Peru. in: American Antiquity - Vol. 28, no. 3 (January 1963), p. 360 – 371
- Patterson, T. C., Moseley, Michael E (1969) Late Preceramic and Early Ceramic Cultures of the Central Coast of Peru, (PDF) Ñawpa Pacha, 6:115-133.
- Slovak, Nicole M. - Paytan, Adina - Wiegand, Bettina A. (2009) Reconstructing Middle Horizon mobility patterns on the coast of Peru through strontium isotope analysis. (PDF) Journal of Archaeological Science
- Young-Sánchez, Margaret (2000) Textiles from Peru's central Coast 750-110: the Reiss and Stübel collection from Ancón. New York, 2000 Ph.D. Thesis - Columbia University. Graduate School of Arts and Sciences

(Spanish)

- Fernandini Parodí, Francesca G.: «Contextos funerarios del Horizonte Medio en la Necrópolis de Ancón». Revista Electrónica de Arqueología PUCP, Vol. 1 - Nro. 5 - Noviembre 2006.
- Segura, Rafael: «Los contextos funerarios de fines del Horizonte Medio en la Necrópolis de Ancón». BOLETIN DE ARQUEOLOGIA PUCP, VOL. 1, 1997, 241–251.
- Kauffmann Doig, Federico: Historia y arte del Perú antiguo. Tomo 1. Lima, Ediciones PEISA, 2002. ISBN 9972-40-213-4
- Makowski, Krzysztof: Primeras civilizaciones. Enciclopedia Temática del Perú. Tomo 2. Lima, Empresa Editora “El Comercio” S.A., 2004. ISBN 9972-217-17-5
- Tauro del Pino, Alberto: Enciclopedia Ilustrada del Perú. Tercera Edición. Tomo 1. AAA/ANG. Lima, PEISA, 2001. ISBN 9972-40-150-2
