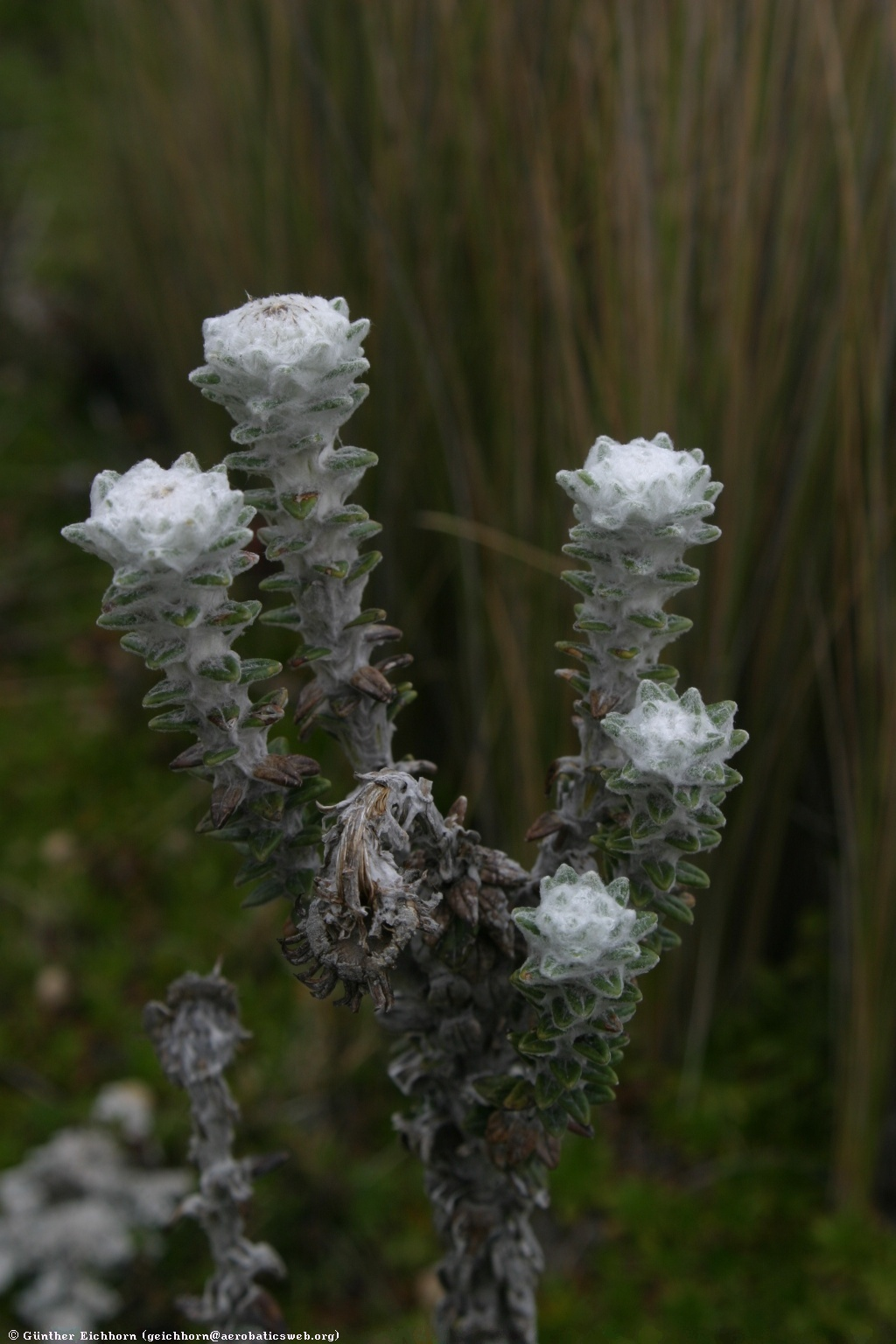
- Lasiocephalus ovatus

Scientific classification
- Kingdom: Plantae
- Clade: Tracheophytes
- Clade: Angiosperms
- Clade: Eudicots
- Clade: Asterids
- Order: Asterales
- Family: Asteraceae
- Tribe: Senecioneae
- Genus: Lasiocephalus; Willd. ex D.F.K.Schltdl.

= Lasiocephalus =

Genus of flowering plants

Lasiocephalus is a genus of South American flowering plants in groundsel tribe within the sunflower family. The genus was shown to be part of Senecio and predominantly occurs in tropical alpine-like regions.

Species

- Lasiocephalus doryphyllus (Cuatrec.) Cuatrec. - Venezuela, Colombia
- Lasiocephalus gargantanus (Cuatrec.) Cuatrec. - Colombia
- Lasiocephalus lingulatus Schltdl. - Ecuador
- Lasiocephalus loeseneri (Hieron.) Cuatrec. - Peru
- Lasiocephalus longipenicillatus (Sch.Bip. ex Sandwith) Cuatrec. - Venezuela
- Lasiocephalus ovatus Schltdl. - Colombia, Ecuador
- Lasiocephalus pichinchensis Cuatrec. - Ecuador
- Lasiocephalus puracensis (Cuatrec.) Cuatrec. - Colombia
- Lasiocephalus sodiroi (Hieron.) Cuatrec. - Ecuador
- Lasiocephalus yacuanquensis (Cuatrec.) Cuatrec. - Colombia
