= Alfred Nehring =

German zoologist and paleontologist (1845–1904)

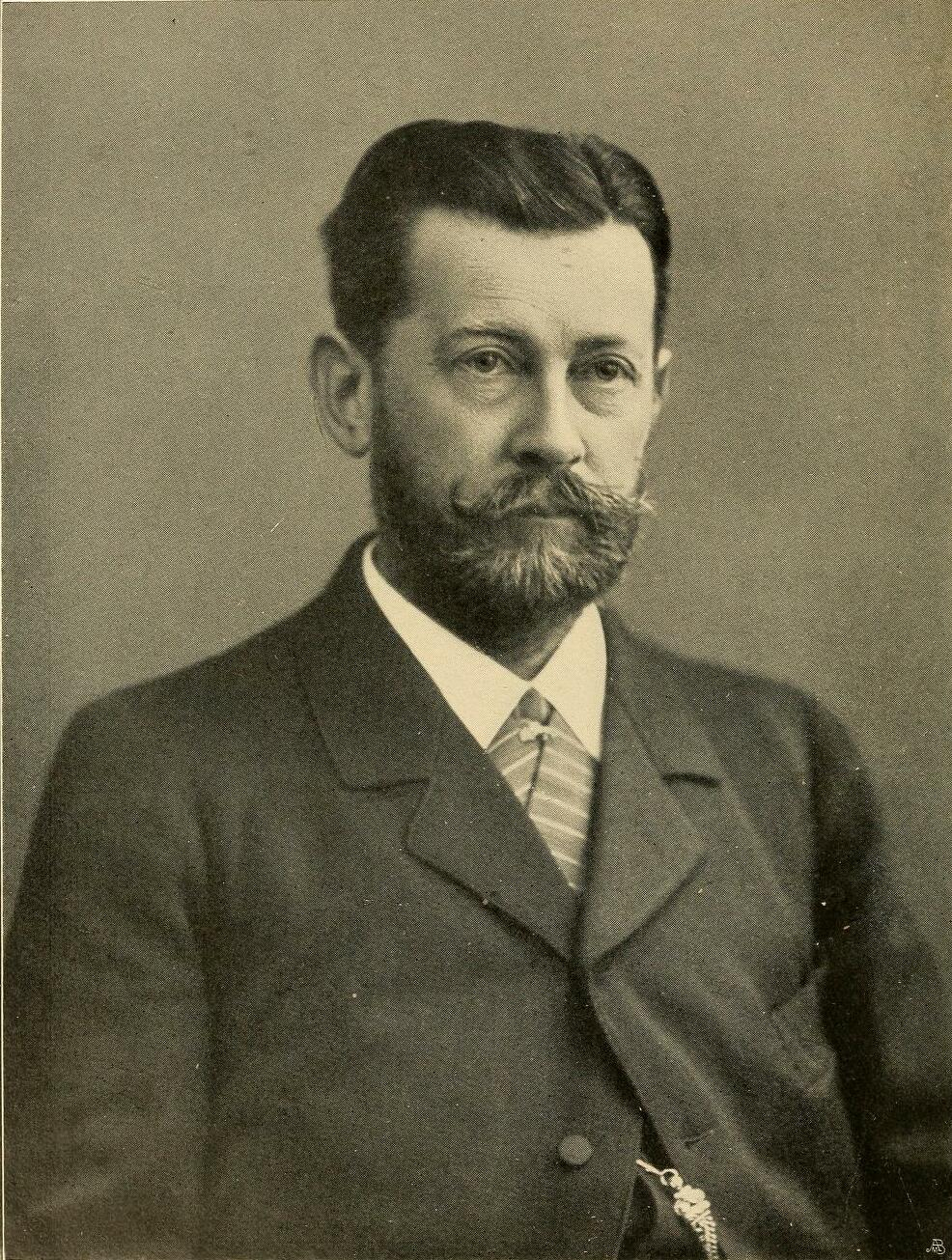
Photo of Alfred Nehring

Alfred Nehring (29 January 1845 in Gandersheim – 29 September 1904 in Berlin-Charlottenburg) was a German zoologist and paleontologist. He was a founding professor of zoology at the Royal agricultural university in Berlin.

Nehring was born in Gandersheim and was educated at Helmstedt and then in Braunschweig, passing his exams in 1863. He then joined the University of Göttingen and then received a doctorate from Halle in 1867. He passed the teachers exam and joined the Royal Gymnasium in Wesel (1867), later moving to Wolfenbüttel (1871). His paleontology work attracted interest from Rudolf Virchow, and in 1881 he became a professor of zoology at the newly founded Royal Agricultural University / Landwirtschaftliche Hochschule in Berlin. He worked there until his death. His main interests were in the Pleistocene fossils from Thiede, Immendorf, Groß- and Klein-Vahlberg, Schöppenstedt, Hornburg and Osterode, Neinstedt, Suderode, Gernrode, Quedlinburg and Westeregeln. He also investigated the deposits in Köchingen and Vollstedt.

Nehring was a member of the Leopoldina Academy and in 1895 he received an Order of the Red Eagle, IVth Class.

Nehring's scientific investigations involved modern and prehistoric vertebrates, being particularly interested in the history and morphology of domesticated animals (horses, dogs, etc.). In his studies of the guinea pig, he asserted Cavia cutleri to be the direct ancestor of the domesticated guinea pig.

== Selected writings ==
- Ueber die Cerviden von Piracicaba in Brasilien (Prov. St. Paulo), 1884 - On cervids of Piracicaba.
- Ueber eine Pelzrobben-Art von der Küste Süd-brasiliens, 1887 - About a fur seal species from coastal southern Brazil.
- Ueber Sus celebensis und Verwandte, 1889 - On the Celebes warty pig and related animals.
- Ueber Tundren und Steppen der jetzt- und vorzeit, mit besonderer Berücksichtigung ihrer Fauna, 1890 - On tundra and steppes (past and present), with special reference to its fauna.
- Die geographische Verbreitung der Säugetiere in dem Tschernosem-Gebiete des rechten Wolgaufers, sowie in den angrenzenden Gebieten, 1891 - Geographical distribution of mammals in the Chernozem regions on the right bank of the Volga, and adjacent areas.
- Neue Notizen über cervus megaceros var. Ruffii Nhrg und über das diluviale Torflager von Klinge bei Kottbus, 1892 - New information on Cervus megaceros, etc.
- Ueber Kreuzungen von Cavia aperea und Cavia cobaya, 1893 - On crossbreeding Cavia aperea and Cavia cobaya.
- Ueber Herberstain und Hirsfogel; Beiträge zur kenntnis ihres lebens und ihrer werke, 1897 - On Herberstain and Hirsfogel: Contributions to the knowledge of their work.
- Eine neue Nesokia-Species aus Palästina, 1898 - A new species of Nesokia in Palestine.
- Die Priorität des Genusnamens Cricetus. In: Zoologischer Anzeiger, 1900 - The priority of the genus name Cricetus.
- Die Schädel von Ctenomys minutus Nhrg., Ct. torquatus Licht. und Ct. Pundti Nhrg, 1900 - The skull of Ctenomys minutus, etc.

Nehring also made contributions to Reiss & Stübel's Das Totenfeld von Ancon in Peru (translated into English as "The necropolis of Ancon in Peru; a contribution to our knowledge of the culture and industries of the empire of the Incas", etc.)
