= Wilhelm Reiss =

German geologist and explorer (1838–1908)

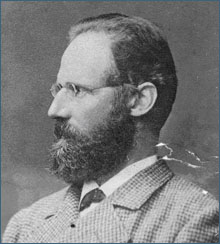
Wilhelm Reiss (1838-1908)

Wilhelm Reiss (13 June 1838 – 29 September 1908) was a German geologist and explorer born in Mannheim. Along with Angel Escobar, he was the first person to scale Cotopaxi in (1872), and with vulcanologist Alphons Stübel, he was the first to ascend Tungurahua (1873).

He initially took business courses in Antwerp, but his interest soon turned towards geology. In 1858-60 he performed scientific research in Madeira, the Azores and the Canary Islands. He studied sciences at several German learning institutions, earning his doctorate in 1864 from the University of Heidelberg. In 1866, with Stübel and geologist Karl von Fritsch, he conducted research in Santorini.

In early 1868, with Stübel, he embarked on an exploratory trip to Hawaii. However, during a stopover in Colombia, the two men became fascinated with the Andes, and spent the next several years performing volcanological, geological, ethnographical and archaeological research in Colombia, Ecuador and Peru. In April 1876 Reiss returned to Germany from Rio de Janeiro, with Stübel continuing scientific investigations in Uruguay, Argentina, Chile and Bolivia.

From 1885 to 1887 he was director of the Gesellschaft für Erdkunde zu Berlin (Society for Geography in Berlin), and in 1888 became director of the Berliner Gesellschaft für Anthropologie, Ethnologie und Urgeschichte (Berlin Society for Anthropology, Ethnology and Prehistory). In 1892 he moved to Könitz, near the town of Saalfeld, where he died on 29 September 1908.

== See also ==
- Ancon (archaeological site)

== Selected publications ==
- Das Totenfeld von Ancón in Peru (Burial Grounds of Ancon in Peru), Berlin (1880–86) with Alphons Stübel; translated into English as "The necropolis of Ancon in Peru; a contribution to our knowledge of the culture and industries of the empire of the Incas", etc.
  - English Translation: The Necropolis of Ancon in Peru: A Contribution to Our Knowledge of the Culture and Industries of the Empire of the Incas, 3 vols : vol. 1, vol. 2, vol. 3
- Kultur und Industrie südamerikanischer Völker (Culture and industry of South American people), Berlin (1889–90)
- Reisen in Südamerika (Journey in South America), Berlin (1890)
- Geologische Studien in der Republik Columbia (Geological studies in the Republic of Colombia), three volumes; Berlin (1892–99)
- Das Hochgebirge der Republik Ecuador (The highlands of the Republic of Ecuador), two volumes; Berlin (1892–1902)
- Ecuador 1870-74: petrographische Untersuchungen (Ecuador 1870-74: petrographic investigations), Berlin (1901).

== Sources ==
- The Life and Work of Alphons Stübel and Wilhelm Reiss, translated from Spanish
- Parts of this article are based on a translation of an article from the German Wikipedia.
