= Cotopaxi =

Active stratovolcano in Ecuador

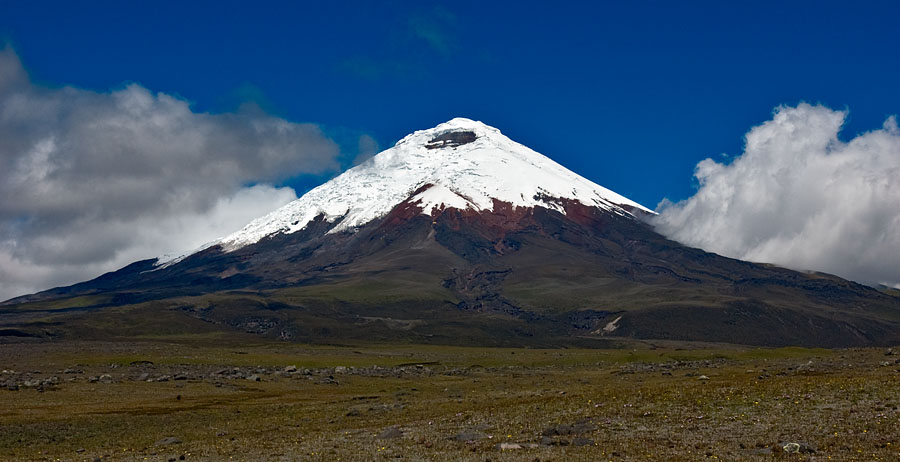
- Cotopaxi seen from the high plain (at least 3,700 m (12,139 ft)) of Cotopaxi National Park

Highest point
- Elevation: 5,897 m (19,347 ft)
- Prominence: 2,500 m (8,202 ft)
- Listing: Ultra
- Coordinates: 0°40′50″S 78°26′16″W

Geography
- Location: Cotopaxi, Latacunga, Ecuador
- Parent range: Andes

Geology
- Mountain type: Stratovolcano
- Volcanic zone: South Volcanic Zone
- Last eruption: 2023

Climbing
- First ascent: 28 November 1872 by Wilhelm Reiss and Ángel Escobar
- Easiest route: North side: Glacier/Snow Climb (Grade PD-)

Major volcanoes in Ecuador

Cotopaxi (US: /koʊtəˈpɑːksi/ KOH-tə-PAHK-see, UK: /kɒtəˈpæksi/ KOT-ə-PAK-see, Spanish: [kotoˈpaɣsi]) is an active stratovolcano in the Andes Mountains, located in Cotopaxi National Park in Cotopaxi Province, about 50 km (31.1 mi) south of Quito, and 31 km (19 mi) northeast of the city of Latacunga, Ecuador. It is the second highest summit in Ecuador (after Chimborazo), reaching a height of 5,897 m (19,347 ft). Cotopaxi is among the highest active volcanoes in the world.

Cotopaxi is known to have erupted 87 times, resulting in the creation of numerous valleys formed by lahars (mudflows) around the volcano. An eruption began on 21 October 2022.

At the end of February 2023, the Geophysical Institute of Ecuador reported that Cotopaxi had produced around 8,000 earthquakes since October 21, 2022, amounting to 1,600 events per month.

== Description ==
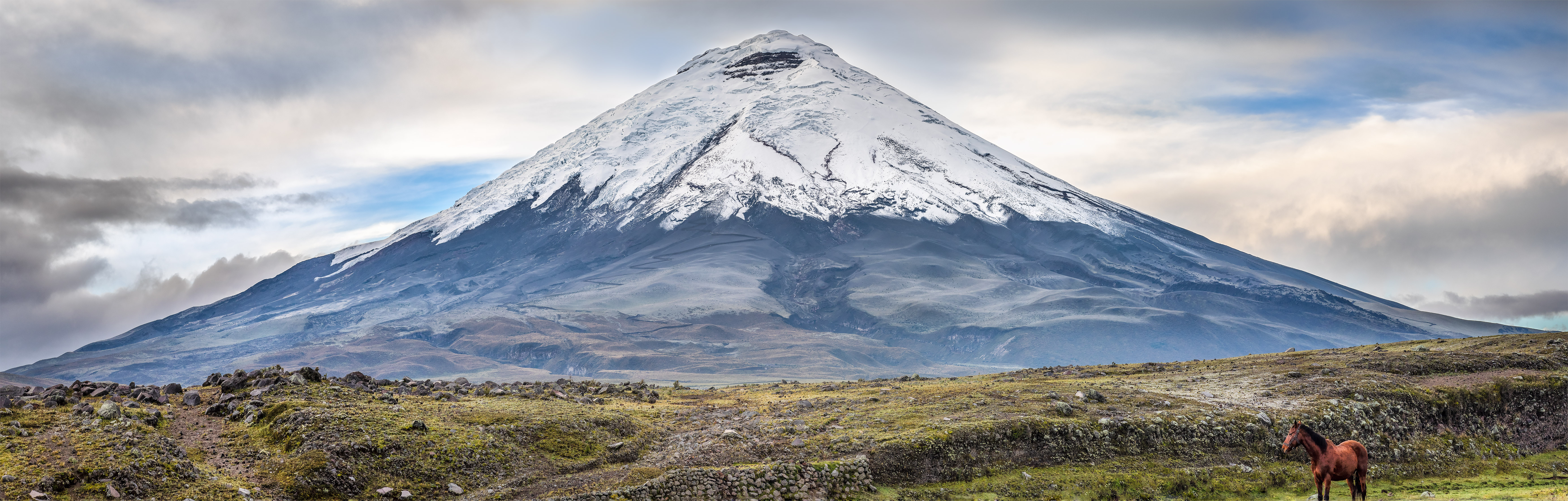
Cotopaxi

On a clear day, Cotopaxi is clearly visible on the skyline from Latacunga and Quito. It is part of the chain of volcanoes around the Pacific Plate known as the Pacific Ring of Fire. It has an almost symmetrical cone that rises from a highland plain of about 3,800 m (12,470 ft), with a width at its base of about 23 km (14 mi). It has one of the few equatorial glaciers in the world, which starts at the height of 5,000 m (16,400 ft). At its summit, Cotopaxi has an 800 m × 550 m (2,620 ft × 1,800 ft) wide crater which is 250 m (820 ft) deep. The crater consists of two concentric crater rims, the outer one being partly free of snow and irregular in shape. The crater interior is covered with ice cornices and is rather flat. The highest point is on the outer rim of the crater on the north side.

== History ==
=== Name ===
According to locals who speak Quechua, coto means 'neck' and paxi means 'moon' (Quechua q'oto 'throat' + Aymara phakhsi 'moon'). This refers to the crater of Cotopaxi that looks like a crescent moon. The mountain was honored as a sacred mountain by local Andean people, even before the Inca invasion in the 15th century. It was worshiped as rain sender, which served as the guarantor of the land's fertility, and at the same time its summit was revered as a place where gods lived.

=== Historic eruptions ===
With 87 known eruptions, Cotopaxi is one of Ecuador's most active volcanoes. Its first recorded eruption was in 1534. This eruption appears to have deposited an ash layer in the lakes of El Cajas National Park that has been dated to 450±70 cal BP.

Cotopaxi's most violent eruptions in historical times occurred in the years 1742, 1744, 1768, and 1877. The 1744 and 1768 events destroyed the colonial town of Latacunga. During the June 26, 1877 eruption, pyroclastic flows descended on all sides of the mountain melting the entire ice cap, with lahars traveling more than 100 km (62 mi) into the Pacific Ocean and western Amazon basin draining the valley. The city of Latacunga was again leveled completely due to the mudslide deposits.

The eruption on 19 June 1742 was witnessed by the scientists Pierre Bouguer and Charles-Marie de La Condamine, members of the French Geodesic Mission, as they descended from nearby Guagua Pichincha.

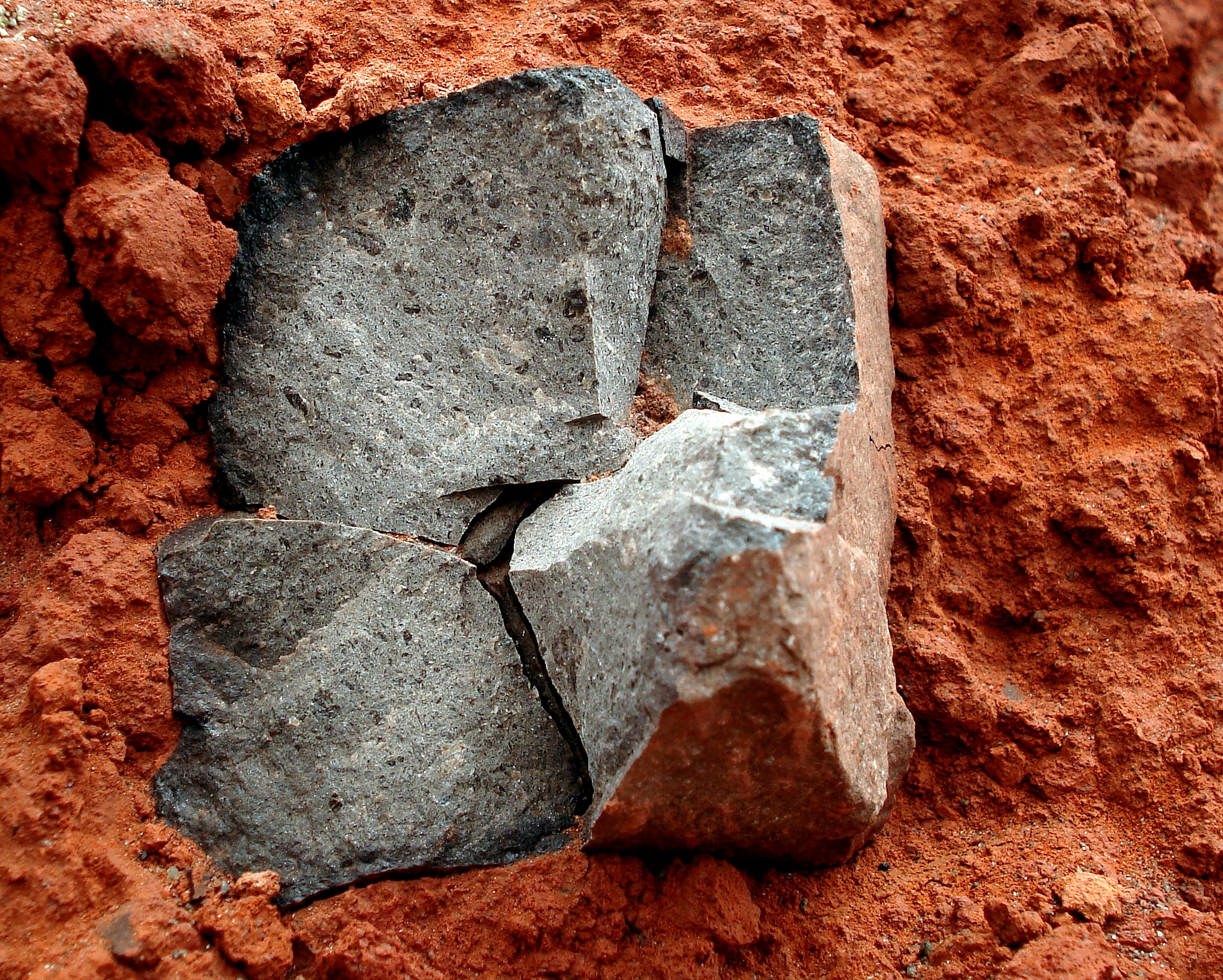
Block of lava encased in tephra – products of different types of eruption at Cotopaxi

There was a major eruption from 1903 to 1904, and minor activity persisted until at least 1940 and possibly 1942. (Note that direct observations of minor eruptions can be difficult because of bad weather, hence the uncertainty about the 1942 "eruption.") The same source also reported increased thermal/seismic, non-eruptive activity in 1975 and 2002. In the increased activity of 2002, fumarolic activity and sulfuric emissions increased and ice around the inside and on the southeastern side of the cone started to melt. However, no actual eruption was observed.

In 2015, two large phreatic (steam) eruptions on the morning of August 14 marked a new phase of volcanic activity. The volcano "remains in a very abnormal situation. In August, 2,100 earthquakes were recorded and emission rates of sulfur dioxide reach approximately 20,000 tonnes per day (19,700 long ton/d; 22,000 short ton/d). The government estimates some 300,000 people are at risk from the volcano in the provinces of Cotopaxi, Tungurahua, Napo and Pichincha.

=== Climbing ===
The first non-Spanish European who tried to climb the mountain was Alexander von Humboldt in 1802; however, he only reached a height of about 4,500 m (14,760 ft). In 1858 Moritz Wagner investigated the mountain, but he could not reach the summit either.

On November 28, 1872, German geologist Wilhelm Reiss and his Colombian partner, Angel Escobar, finally reached the summit of Cotopaxi.

In 1873 it was summitted by German Geologist Moritz Alphons Stübel and four Ecuadorians, Rafael Jantui, Melchor Páez, Vicente Ramón and Eusebio Rodriguez.

In 1880 British mountaineer Edward Whymper and the Italian guides Jean-Antoine Carrel and Louis Carrel made the third recorded ascent of Cotopaxi and spent a night on the summit.

Painters Rudolf Reschreiter and Hans Meyer reached the summit in 1903, and many of Reschreiter's paintings feature a view of Cotopaxi.

In the late 20th century, summiting Cotopaxi became a major tourist draw. The José F. Ribas Refuge (Refugio José Félix Ribas) was built in 1971 at an elevation of 4,864 m (15,960 ft) and enlarged in 2005.

A tragedy occurred on Easter Sunday 1996 when an avalanche partially buried the Refuge and dozens of tourists. The glacier above the Refuge was probably weakened by an earthquake that had shaken the entire Province of Cotopaxi for several days prior to the avalanche. In the warm midday sun a huge portion of the ice wall broke loose. Being Easter, there were many day visitors on the mountain who were buried in the ice and snow. Those trapped in the Refuge broke windows on the downhill side to climb to safety, but 13 people died on the slope above. The Refuge itself is located in a valley and consequently vulnerable to future avalanches.

=== Satellite tracking station ===
Cotopaxi was the location of one of the original Minitrack stations, established in 1957 by NASA to track the orbits of early satellites. The Cotopaxi station detected the last transmissions from Vanguard I, in May 1964, and was later also used to track the Apollo missions and the Space Shuttle. The station, which had a staff of 75, eventually closed in 1981 and its equipment was relocated to Dakar, Senegal.

== Recent activity ==
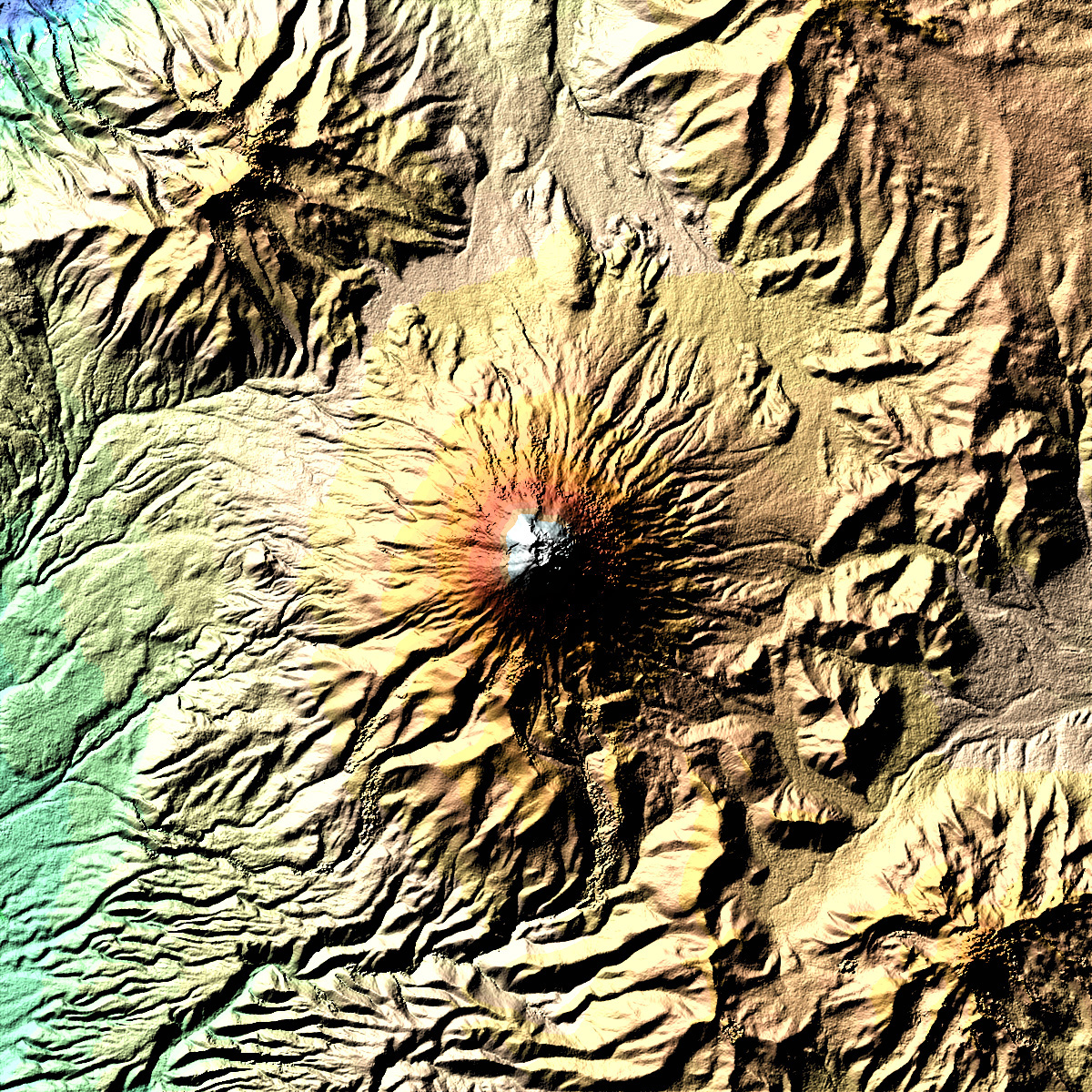
The volcano has an inner crater inside the outer crater. Colors show elevations.

=== Recreation ===
Climbing Cotopaxi to the summit is quite popular, with up to 100 climbers attempting it on weekends. When the summit is quiet, mountain guide companies offer regular guided climbs of the mountain. Climbers grade the conventional route alpine PD (Peu Difficile) or WS (Wenig Schwierig) — or PD/WS+ (indicating "Mildly Difficult PLUS"). Use of crampons and ice axes is mandatory as snow and ice slopes of up to 50 degrees (1 in 2) are encountered, and climbers should be on belay and use aluminum ladders to cross one or two of the crevasses. A 4WD track goes up from the national park entrance to a carpark at 4,600 m (15,100 ft) altitude on north side, just below the José F. Ribas Refuge. This stone mountain hut — owned and operated by Grupo Ascensionismo del Colegio San Gabriel — is situated 200 m (660 ft) higher at 4,800 m (15,700 ft) (a 40-80 minute uphill hike). Here climbers can spend the night and begin their summit bid in the early morning without any intermediate camps. (Typically no more than about half of those attempting to summit Cotopaxi make it to the top after a daunting — though non-technical — six-hour scramble.) Summiting normally starts around 12:30 am, to reach the summit at latest 7:30 am and then return to the hut before the snow melts and glacier crevasses move/evolve. As of July 28, 2014, the Ribas Refuge is under construction. Tour operators shuttle their clients up to the top of the 4WD track once in the afternoon for a glacier skills class, and then again to start the climb around midnight, spending the intervening hours eating dinner and resting at a hostel lower down by the lakes. Adventure tourism operators in Quito also offer mountain biking tours from the Refuge downhill along the dirt track.

=== Eruptions ===
In April 2015, the volcano began to show signs of unrest, and came back to life. There was a large increase in earthquakes (including harmonic tremors) and SO_{2} emissions. IGEPN reported slight deformation of the edifice, suggesting an intrusion of magma under the volcano. As of 25 July, the unrest continued, and a significant eruption of phreatic ash and steam occurred on August 14 and 15, 2015. Ash was deposited heavily in areas close to the volcano, including damaging farmlands on the flanks of neighbouring volcanoes such as El Corazon, and thinly as far as Quito, affecting southern and central areas of the city.

A new eruption began on 21 October 2022 and is ongoing as of June 2023.

Future Cotopaxi eruptions pose a high risk to the local population, their settlements and fields. The main danger of a significant eruption of Cotopaxi would be the flash-melting of its summit glacier, resulting in devastating lahars which would travel down the flanks of the volcano, guided by river valleys whose origins lie at the volcano. Danger from normal, explosive eruptive activity is limited to within Cotopaxi National Park. However, the great distances that lahars of the significant size that Cotopaxi's glacier produces could travel greatly increase the hazard areas to include all river valleys leading from the volcano. If there were to be a very large explosion, it would destroy many northerly settlements within the valley in the suburban area of Quito (pop. more than 2,000,000). Another city which would be in great danger is the regional capital Latacunga, which is located in the south valley, and has been destroyed at least twice (in 1768, 1877) by lahars caused by volcanic activity.

== In art ==
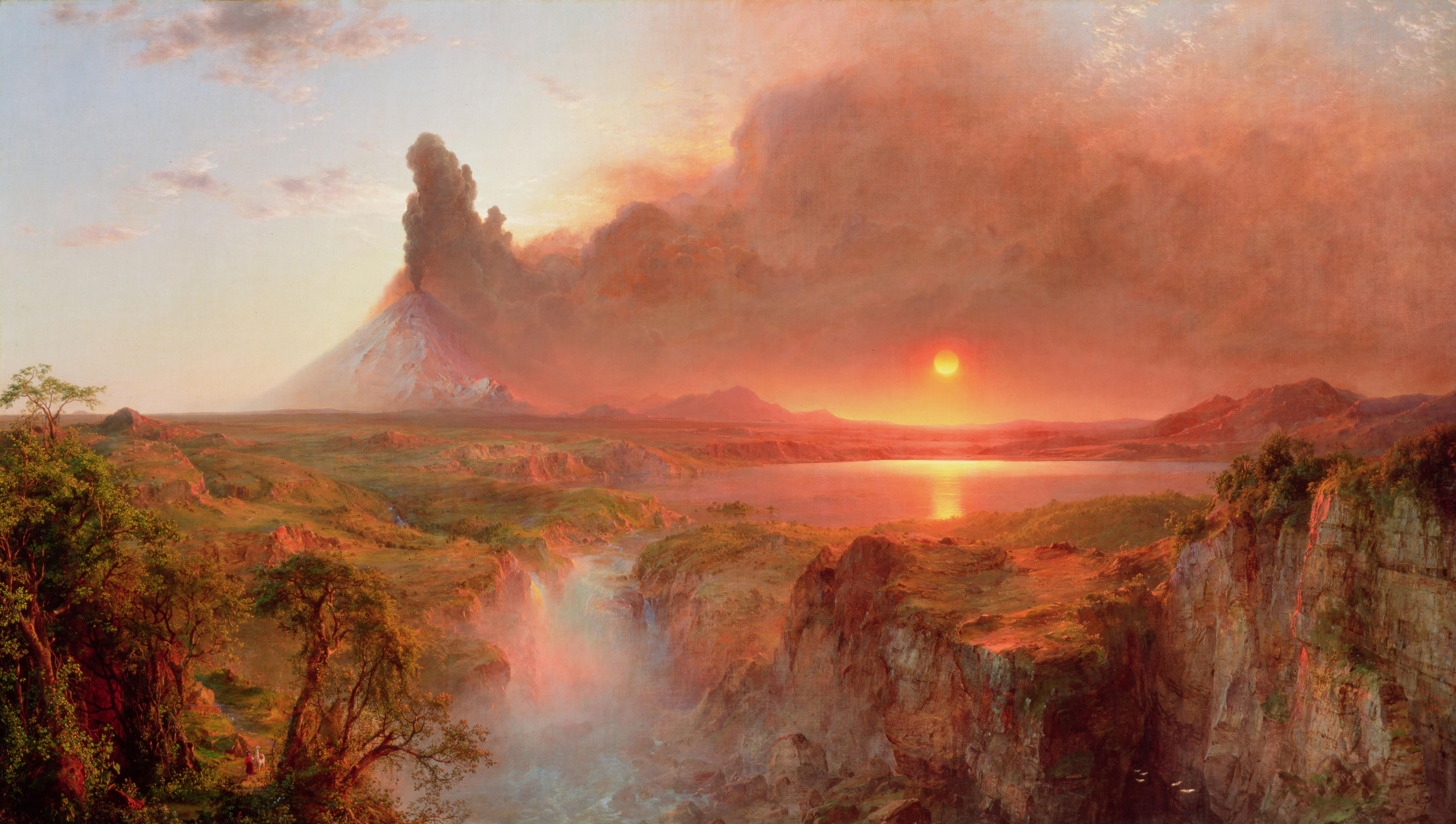
Cotopaxi by Frederic Edwin Church, 1862.

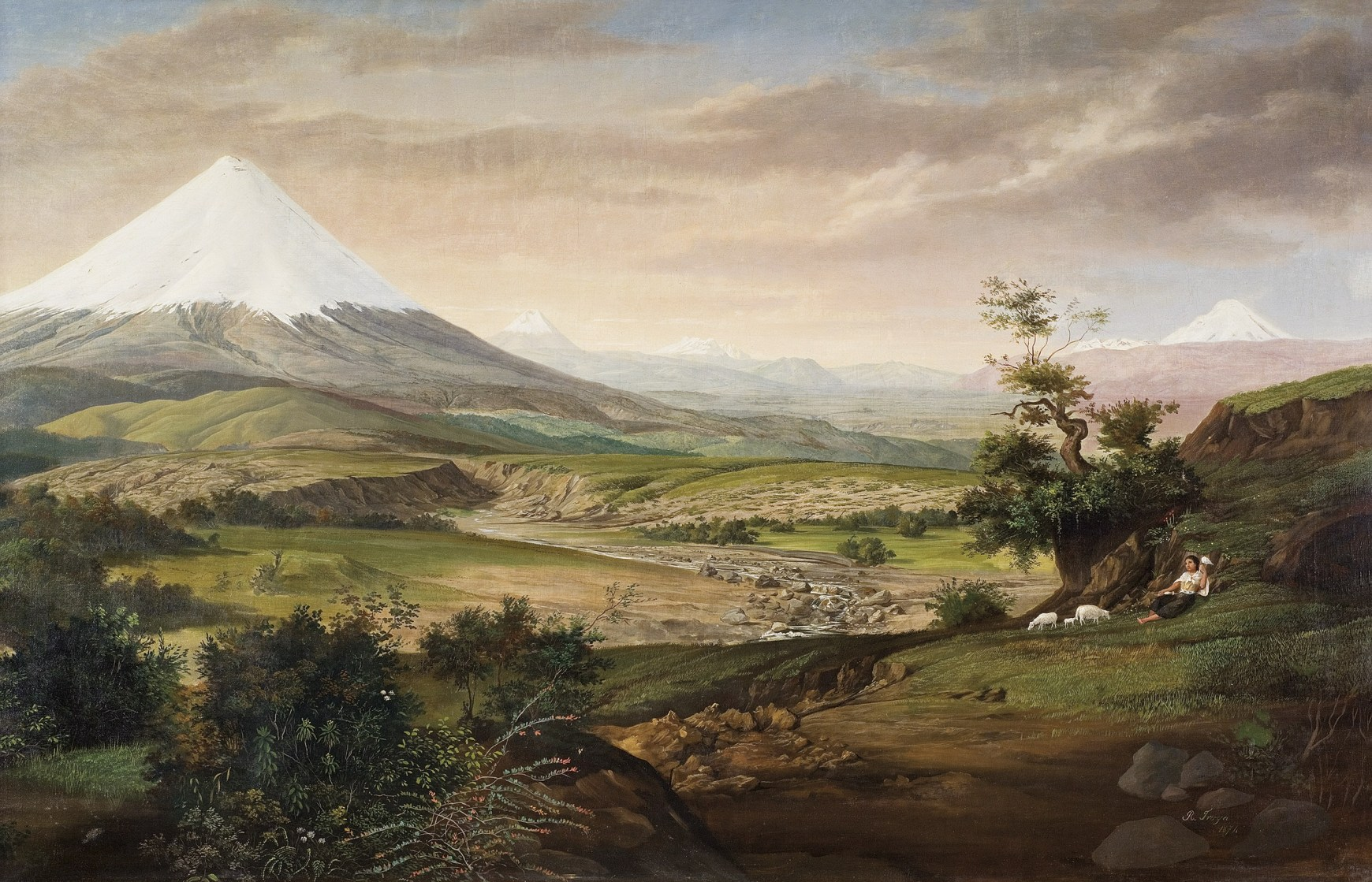
El Cotopaxi by Rafael Troya, 1874.

- Cotopaxi is depicted in the traditional paintings of the indigenous people of Tigua, as the volcano holds significant cultural value.
- Cotopaxi was the subject of important works by painter Frederic Edwin Church in 1855 and 1862.
- In The Star (1897), a short story by H. G. Wells, Cotopaxi erupts with a tumult of lava that reaches the coastline in a day.
- In the poem Romance ("Chimborazo, Cotopaxi....Popocatapetl") by Walter J. Turner (1916), Cotopaxi is one of the romantic locations that has stolen the poet's heart.
- In Shadrach in the Furnace (1976), a science fiction novel by Robert Silverberg, an eruption by Cotopaxi becomes known as "the night of Cotopaxi". It starts a series of disasters and uprisings that establish in the early 21st century a world dictatorship by the Mongolian Genghis Mao.
- In the American film Close Encounters of the Third Kind (1977), the SS Cotopaxi, a ship named Cotopaxi that disappeared in 1925, appears in the Gobi Desert.
- American rock band The Mars Volta have a 2009 song named after the mountain.
- The cover art of the Cell Reports issue from Oct 2024 features an image taken on the slopes of Cotopaxi.

== See also ==
- List of volcanoes in Ecuador
- List of volcanic eruptions by death toll
