= Alphons Stübel =

German geologist and naturalist (1835–1904)

Moritz Alphons Stübel (26 July 1835 – 10 November 1904) was a German geologist and naturalist.

== Biography ==
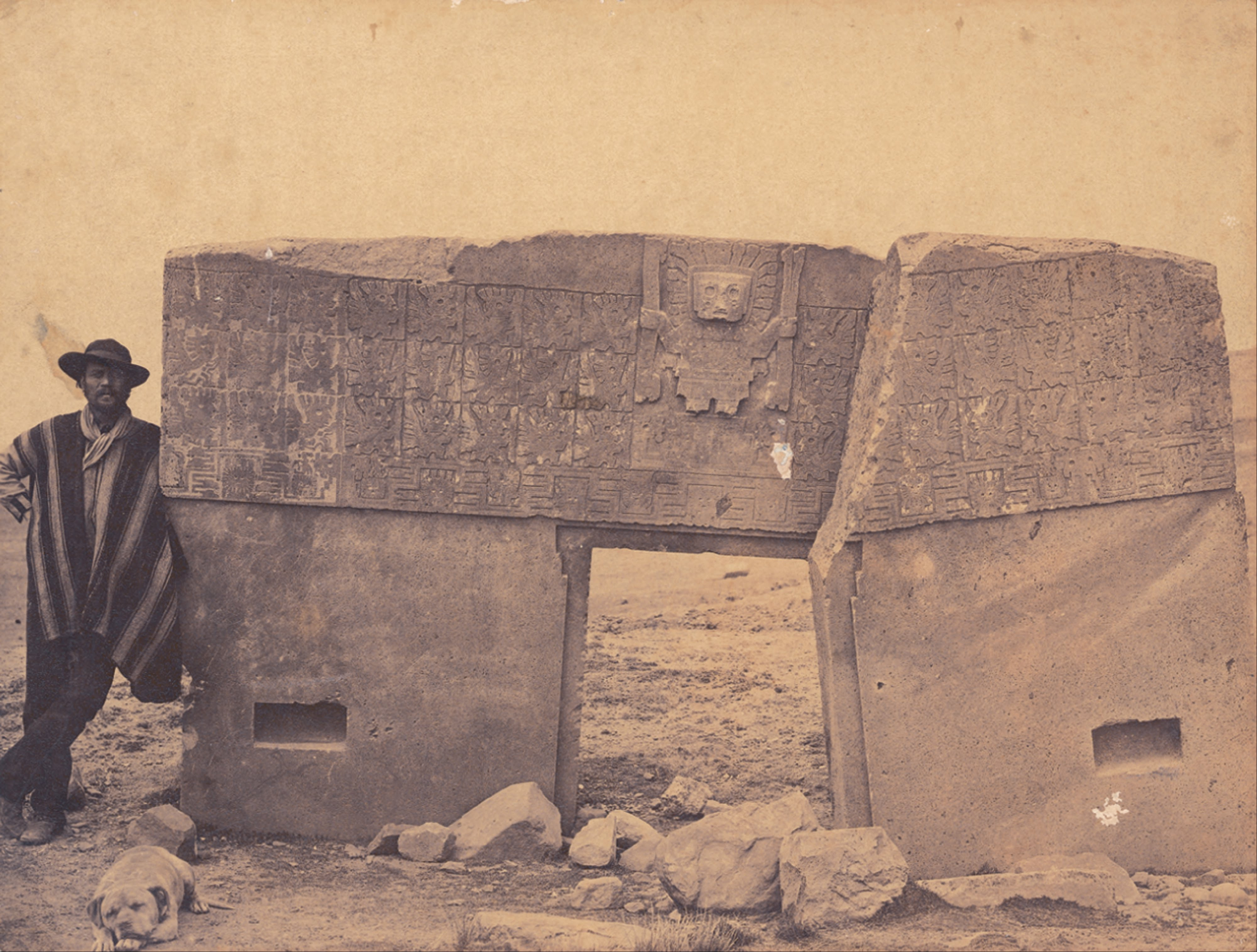
Stübel at the Gate of the Sun at Tiahuanaco, 1877

He studied chemistry and mineralogy at the University of Leipzig. With geologist Wilhelm Reiss (1838–1908), he conducted geological and volcanological research in the Andes—Colombia and Ecuador—from 1868 to 1874. Afterwards the two geologists continued their research in Peru and Brazil, with Reiss returning to Germany in 1876 and Stübel continuing his travels throughout the continent: Uruguay, Argentina, Chile and Bolivia – returning to Germany in August 1877.

In South America, he also made astronomical measurements and performed meteorological, ethnographical, zoological, and archaeological research. Scientific material collected in South America was later preserved at the Museum of Comparative Cultures in Leipzig. In addition, Stübel took numerous photographs and created sketches of the places he visited. Many of the butterflies collected by Stübel were new species. They were described by German entomologists Gustav Weymer and Peter Maassen.

Stübel also made a lesser known contribution to the study of the Middle East. In the years 1858, 1882, and 1890, he traveled mainly in Syria, Lebanon, Palestine, and Egypt. He collected about 600 large-size photographs on these journeys and at other occasions. This collection came via his nephew, Bruno Stübel, to the University of Jena. They form the core of the "Alphons-Stübel Collection of Early Photographs of the Middle East 1850–1890".

A digital collection of Stübel's photographs is held at the Leibniz-Institut für Länderkunde.
