= Takatu National Park =

National park in Balochistan, Pakistan

Coordinates: 30°20′58″N 67°01′57″E

- تکتو نیشنل پارک
- IUCN category II (national park)
- Interactive map of Takatu National Park
- Location: Balochistan
- Nearest city: Quetta,& Pishin Districts
- Area: 13,524.594 ha (52.21875 sq mi)
- Established: 2025
- Governing body: Balochistan Wildlife Department

Takatu National Park is a national park in Quetta District and Pishin District, Balochistan, Pakistan. Declared as a national park on 13 January 2025, Takatu is known for its flora and fauna, among which several are endagered species—notably the Sulaiman markhor. Koh-i-Takatu, the third highest peak in Balochistan, is also situated here.

== Flora and Fauna ==
Takatu Park is roughly located 15 to 16 miles in the North-East of Chiltan Park which makes its environment very similar to Chiltan. Due to this both parks have a similar bio-diversity.

=== Animals ===
Name of animal	Scientific name
Afghan hedgehog	Hemiechinus auritus megalotis
Brandt's hedgehog	Paraechinus hypomelas
Balochistan short-tailed shrew	Crocidura gmelini
Zarudny's rock shrew	Crocidura zarudnyi
Greater horseshoe bat	Rhinolophus ferrumequinum
Indian wolf	Canis lupus pallipes
Asiatic jackal	Canis aureus
Red fox	Vulpes vulpes
Caracal	Caracal caracal
Jungle cat	Felis chaus
Beech marten	Martes foina
Marbled polecat	Vormela peregusna
Striped hyena	Hyaena hyaena
Chiltan ibex	Capra aegagrus chialtanensis
Cape hare	Lepus capensis
Afghan pika	Ochotona rufescens
Grey dwarf hamster	Cricetulus migratorius
Baluchi mouse-like hamster	Calomyscus baluchi
Small five-toed jerboa	Allactaga elater
Forest dormouse	Dryomys nitedula
Indian crested porcupine	Hystrix indica
Sundevall's jird	Meriones crassus
Persian jird	Meriones persicus
Libyan jird	Meriones libycus
Southern mole vole	Ellobius fuscocapillus
Brown spiny mouse	Mus saxicola
Black rat	Rattus rattus
Sand-colored soft-furred rat	Millardia gleadowi
House mouse	Mus musculus
Indian bandicoot rat	Nesokia indica

=== Birds ===
Name of animal	Scientific name	Distribution	Type
Shikra	Accipiter badius	Near rest-house	WV/SBV
Eurasian sparrowhawk	Accipiter nisus		SBV
Black kite	Milvus migrans		SBV
Golden eagle	Aquila chrysaetos		R/WV
Tawny eagle	Aquila rapax		R
Bonelli's eagle	Hieraaetus fasciatus		R
Short-toed snake eagle	Circaetus gallicus		R
Bearded vulture	Gypaetus barbatus		WV/R
Griffon vulture	Gyps fulvus		R
Egyptian vulture	Neophron percnopterus		SBV
Cinereous vulture	Aegypius monachus		SBV/WV
Long-legged buzzard	Buteo rufinus		WV
Hen harrier	Circus cyaneus		R/WV
Common kestrel	Falco tinnunculus		R/WV
Eurasian hobby	Falco subbuteo		WV
Saker falcon	Falco cherrug		WV
Peregrine falcon	Falco peregrinus		SBV/WV
Merlin	Falco columbarius		SBV/WV
See-see partridge	Ammoperdix griseogularis		R
Chukar partridge	Alectoris chukar		R
Houbara bustard	Chlamydotis undulata		WV/PM
White-tailed lapwing	Chettusia leucura		PM/SBV
Spotted sandgrouse	Pterocles senegallus		PM/WV
Rock dove	Columba livia		R
Common wood pigeon	Columba palumbus		R
European turtle dove	Streptopelia turtur		WV
Eurasian collared dove	Streptopelia decaocto		R/SBV
Laughing dove	Spilopelia senegalensis		R/SBV
Rose-ringed parakeet	Psittacula krameri		SBV
Common cuckoo	Cuculus canorus		SB
Spotted owlet	Athene brama		R
Eurasian eagle-owl	Bubo bubo		R
Eurasian scops owl	Otus scops	SBV	
Pallid scops owl	Otus brucei		SBV
European nightjar	Caprimulgus europaeus		SBV/WV
Common swift	Apus apus		SBV
Little swift	Apus affinis		SBV
Alpine swift	Apus melba		SBV
European bee-eater	Merops apiaster	SBV	
Asian green bee-eater	Merops orientalis		SBV
Eurasian hoopoe	Upupa epops		SBV
Scaly-bellied woodpecker	Picus squamatus		R
Hume's short-toed lark	Calandrella acutirostris		SBV
Greater short-toed lark	Calandrella brachydactyla		WV
Oriental skylark	Alauda gulgula		R
Great Grey Shrike	Lanius excubitor		WV
Lesser whitethroat	Sylvia curruca		WV
Bay-backed shrike	Lanius vittatus		WV
Eurasian skylark	Alauda arvensis		WV

== See also ==
- Hazarganji-Chiltan National Park
- Hingol National Park
