= Hazarganji-Chiltan National Park =

National park in Balochistan, Pakistan

- ہزارگنجی-چلٹن نیشنل پارک پارک ملی هزارگانجی-چیلتان
- IUCN category II (national park)
- Interactive map of Hazarganji-Chiltan National Park
- Location: Balochistan
- Nearest city: Quetta
- Coordinates: 30°13′12″N 66°43′48″E
- Area: 15,555 ha (60.06 sq mi)
- Established: 1980
- Governing body: Balochistan Wildlife Department

Hazarganji Chiltan National Park is a national park in the Mastung District of western Balochistan Province of Pakistan. It lies between Chiltan on its west and Hazarganji on the east. The park was established in 1980 to provide the habitat to rare Chiltan ibexes found in the area.

It was established in 1980 and covers 131,522 ha (324,998 acres) of land located close to the Koh-i-Chiltan mountain in Quetta's outskirt.

The park is located in the Sulaiman Mountains, with desert and forest habitats, about 20 kilometres (12 mi) southwest of the city of Quetta.

== Etymology ==
The name comes from the travelling route between the mountains called "Hazarganji", which means (of a thousand treasures) in native language as it was a historical passage for the Greco-Bactrian, the Mongols, the Scythians and migrating hordes of Baloch tribes.

== Biodiversity ==
The biodiversity of this park comprises 30 species of mammals (9 species of large mammals and 21 species of small mammals), 120 species of avifauna (36 resident and 84 migratory) and 30 species of reptiles.

=== Flora ===
The trees in the forests include Pashtun Juniper (Juniperus macropoda), pistachio, almond, and ash trees.

=== Fauna ===
The fauna comprises about 300-400 rare Sulaiman Markhor and around 800 Chiltan ibex survive within the park boundaries. Few urials still survives in the western slopes between 1,500m to 2,100m. Other fauna includes Indian wolf, striped hyena, Baluchistan leopard, caracal, common jackal and Indian crested porcupine. Birds includes the very rare Houbara bustard, griffon vulture, Egyptian vulture, crested honey buzzard (winters only), laggar falcon, peregrine falcon, common kestrel, Eurasian sparrowhawk (winters only), Indian scops owl, Indian cuckoo, European bee-eater (breeding only), chukar partridge, European nightjar (breeding/summer only), long-billed pipit, Eastern Orphean warbler, variable wheatear, blue rock thrush, whinchat, white-browed bush chat and Lichtenstein's desert finch and reptiles are also found here likes of monitor lizards, Russell's viper, saw-scaled vipers and spiny-tailed lizards.

== Species ==
=== Mammals ===
Total 30 species of mammals include:

Name of animal	Scientific name	Distribution
Afghan hedgehog	Hemiechinus auritus megalotis	Chiltan, Hazarganji, Kharkhasa
Brandt's hedgehog	Paraechinus hypomelas	Hazarganji, Kharkhasa
Balochistan short-tailed shrew	Crocidura gmelini	Chiltan, Hazarganji, Kharkhasa
Zarudny's rock shrew	Crocidura zarudnyi	Hazarganji, Kharkhasa
Greater horseshoe bat	Rhinolophus ferrumequinum	Hazarganji
Indian wolf	Canis lupus pallipes	Chiltan, Hazarganji
Asiatic jackal	Canis aureus	Chiltan, Hazarganji, Kharkhasa
Red fox	Vulpes vulpes	Bibi Nala, Chiltan, Duzchur, Hazarganji, Hinjeeri Nala, Ziarat Nala
Caracal	Caracal caracal	Chiltan, Hazarganji, Kharkhasa
Jungle cat	Felis chaus	Chiltan, Hazarganji, Hazarganji Reserve forest, Kharkhasa
Beech marten	Martes foina	Chiltan, Hazarganji, Hazarganji Reserve forest, Kharkhasa
Marbled polecat	Vormela peregusna	Hazarganji, Kharkhasa
Striped hyena	Hyaena hyaena	Chiltan, Hazarganji, Kharkhasa
Chiltan ibex	Capra aegagrus chialtanensis	All over the park
Cape hare	Lepus capensis	Bibi Nala, Hazarganji, Ziarat Nala
Afghan pika	Ochotona rufescens	Hazarganji Reserve forest
Grey dwarf hamster	Cricetulus migratorius	Chiltan, Hazarganji
Baluchi mouse-like hamster	Calomyscus baluchi	Chiltan, Hazarganji, Kharkhasa
Small five-toed jerboa	Allactaga elater	Chiltan Hills, Hazarganji
Forest dormouse	Dryomys nitedula	Chiltan Reserve forest, Hazarganji, Kharkhasa
Indian crested porcupine	Hystrix indica	Chiltan, Hazarganji (1,800–2,500m)
Sundevall's jird	Meriones crassus	Chiltan, Hazarganji
Persian jird	Meriones persicus	Chiltan, Hazarganji
Libyan jird	Meriones libycus	Chiltan, Hazarganji
Southern mole vole	Ellobius fuscocapillus	Chiltan, Hazargani (1,900–2,400m)
Brown spiny mouse	Mus saxicola	Chiltan, Hazarganji
Black rat	Rattus rattus	Museum and rest-house
Sand-colored soft-furred rat	Millardia gleadowi	Hazarganji
House mouse	Mus musculus	Chiltan, Hazarganji
Indian bandicoot rat	Nesokia indica	Bibi Nala, Hazarganji, Hinjeeri Nala, Ziarat Nala

=== Avifauna ===
Name of animal	Scientific name	Distribution	Type
Shikra	Accipiter badius	Near rest-house	WV/SBV
Eurasian sparrowhawk	Accipiter nisus	Chiltan, Hazarganji	SBV
Black kite	Milvus migrans	Chiltan, Hazarganji	SBV
Golden eagle	Aquila chrysaetos	Samthar	R/WV
Tawny eagle	Aquila rapax	Chiltan, Hazarganji	R
Bonelli's eagle	Hieraaetus fasciatus	Hazarganji, Kharkhasa	R
Short-toed snake eagle	Circaetus gallicus	Chiltan, Hazarganji, Kharkhasa	R
Bearded vulture	Gypaetus barbatus	Chiltan, Hazarganji	WV/R
Griffon vulture	Gyps fulvus	Chiltan	R
Egyptian vulture	Neophron percnopterus	Chiltan	SBV
Cinereous vulture	Aegypius monachus	Chiltan	SBV/WV
Long-legged buzzard	Buteo rufinus	Chiltan, Hazarganji, Kharkhasa	WV
Hen harrier	Circus cyaneus	Chiltan Forest	R/WV
Common kestrel	Falco tinnunculus	Chiltan, Hazarganji	R/WV
Eurasian hobby	Falco subbuteo	Chiltan, Kharkhasa	WV
Saker falcon	Falco cherrug	Bibi Nala, Kharkhasa	WV
Peregrine falcon	Falco peregrinus	Chiltan, Hazarganji	SBV/WV
Merlin	Falco columbarius	Chiltan, Hazarganji	SBV/WV
See-see partridge	Ammoperdix griseogularis	Bibi Nala	R
Chukar partridge	Alectoris chukar	Kangri Nala	R
Houbara bustard	Chlamydotis undulata	Hazarganji, Ziarat Nala	WV/PM
White-tailed lapwing	Chettusia leucura	Chiltan, Hazarganji	PM/SBV
Spotted sandgrouse	Pterocles senegallus	Hazarganji	PM/WV
Rock dove	Columba livia	Bibi Nala, Hinjeeri Nala, Nulli Nala	R
Common wood pigeon	Columba palumbus	Bibi Nala, Hinjeeri Nala, Nulli Nala	R
European turtle dove	Streptopelia turtur	Hazarganji Nala	WV
Eurasian collared dove	Streptopelia decaocto	Hazarganji Nala	R/SBV
Laughing dove	Spilopelia senegalensis	Rest-house	R/SBV
Rose-ringed parakeet	Psittacula krameri	Chiltan, Hazarganji	SBV
Common cuckoo	Cuculus canorus	Hazarganji, Kharkhasa	SB
Spotted owlet	Athene brama	Bibi Nala, Chiltan	R
Eurasian eagle-owl	Bubo bubo	Kharkhasa	R
Eurasian scops owl	Otus scops	Hazarganji, Ziarat Nala	SBV
Pallid scops owl	Otus brucei	Chiltan, Hazarganji, Kharkhasa	SBV
European nightjar	Caprimulgus europaeus	Kharkhasa	SBV/WV
Common swift	Apus apus	Chiltan, Hazarganji	SBV
Little swift	Apus affinis	Hazarganji	SBV
Alpine swift	Apus melba	Chiltan Forest, Kharkhasa	SBV
European bee-eater	Merops apiaster	Near rest-house	SBV
Asian green bee-eater	Merops orientalis	Hazarganji	SBV
Eurasian hoopoe	Upupa epops	Stream bed of Chiltan	SBV
Scaly-bellied woodpecker	Picus squamatus	Chiltan, Hazarganji	R
Hume's short-toed lark	Calandrella acutirostris	Chiltan	SBV
Greater short-toed lark	Calandrella brachydactyla	Chiltan Forest	WV
Oriental skylark	Alauda gulgula	Hazarganji	R
Great Grey Shrike	Lanius excubitor	Chiltan, Hazarganji	WV
Lesser whitethroat	Sylvia curruca	Chiltan, Hazarganji	WV
Bay-backed shrike	Lanius vittatus	Chiltan, Hazarganji	WV
Eurasian skylark	Alauda arvensis	Chiltan Reserve forest, Hazarganji	WV

== Chiltan express ==
This train used to have a Quetta-Lahore route via Dera Ghazi Khan and Kot Adu Jn. This route opened in 1973, hence the Chiltan Express likely started operations on or after that year. Over the years the route of the Chiltan Express has been varied many times by running it between Quetta and Peshawar via Faisalabad, between Quetta and Rawalpindi via Lahore, and these days between Quetta and Lahore via Faisalabad.
