= List of mammals of Pakistan =

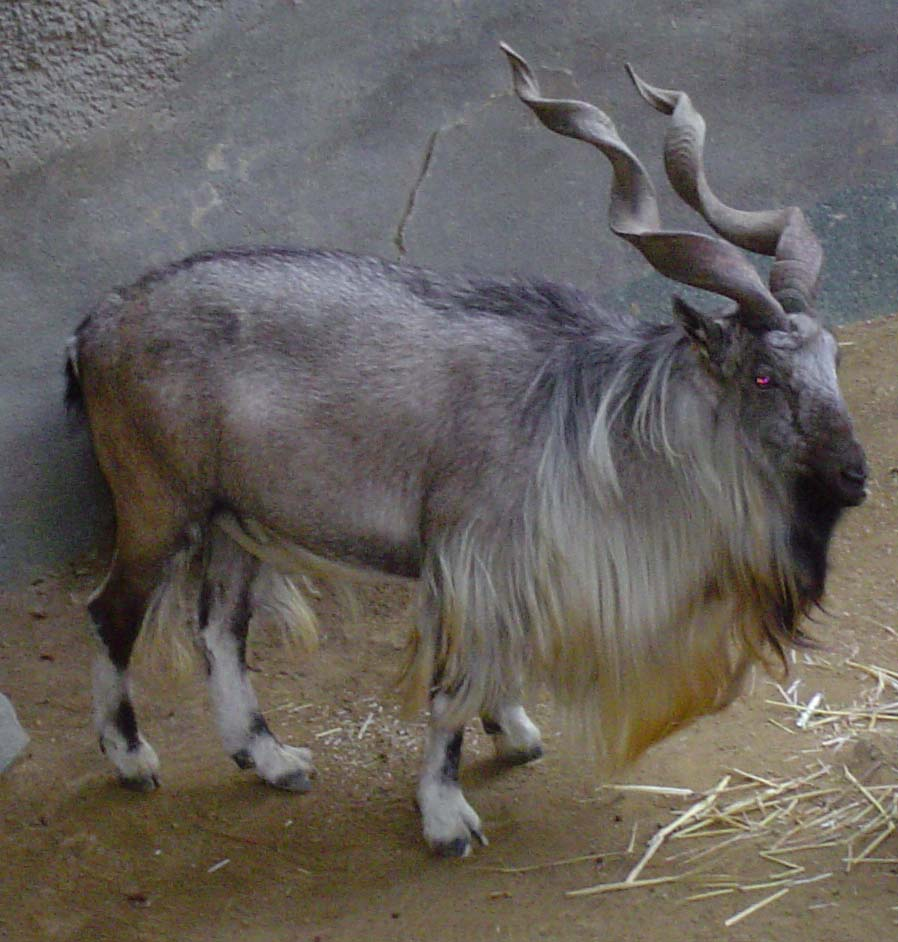
The markhor, is the national animal of Pakistan

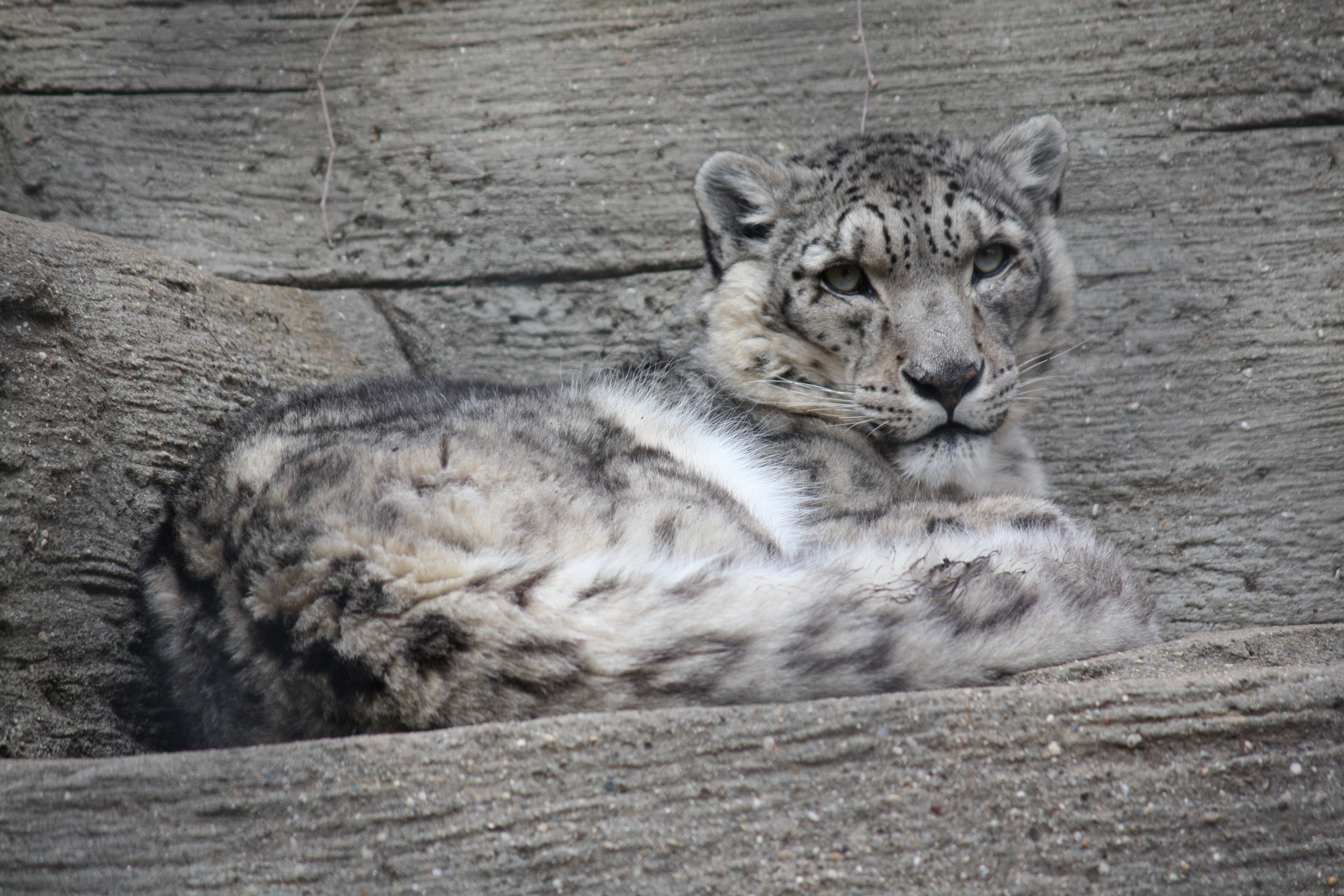
The snow leopard is the national heritage animal of Pakistan

This list of the mammals of Pakistan shows the conservation status of the 176 mammal species occurring in Pakistan, of which 12 are critically endangered, 11 are endangered, 16 are vulnerable, and 10 are near threatened. The largest mammal in Pakistan is the Himalayan brown bear. The markhor is the national animal of Pakistan. The following tags are used to highlight each species' conservation status as assessed on the IUCN Red List:

| DD | Data deficient | There is inadequate information to make an assessment of the risks to this species. |
| EX | Extinct | No reasonable doubt that the last individual has died. |
| EW | Extinct in the wild | Known only to survive in captivity or as a naturalized populations well outside its previous range. |
| CR | Critically endangered | The species is in imminent risk of extinction in the wild. |
| EN | Endangered | The species is facing an extremely high risk of extinction in the wild. |
| VU | Vulnerable | The species is facing a high risk of extinction in the wild. |
| NT | Near threatened | The species does not meet any of the criteria that would categorise it as risking extinction but it is likely to do so in the future. |
| LC | Least concern | There are no current identifiable risks to the species. |

== Order: Primates ==
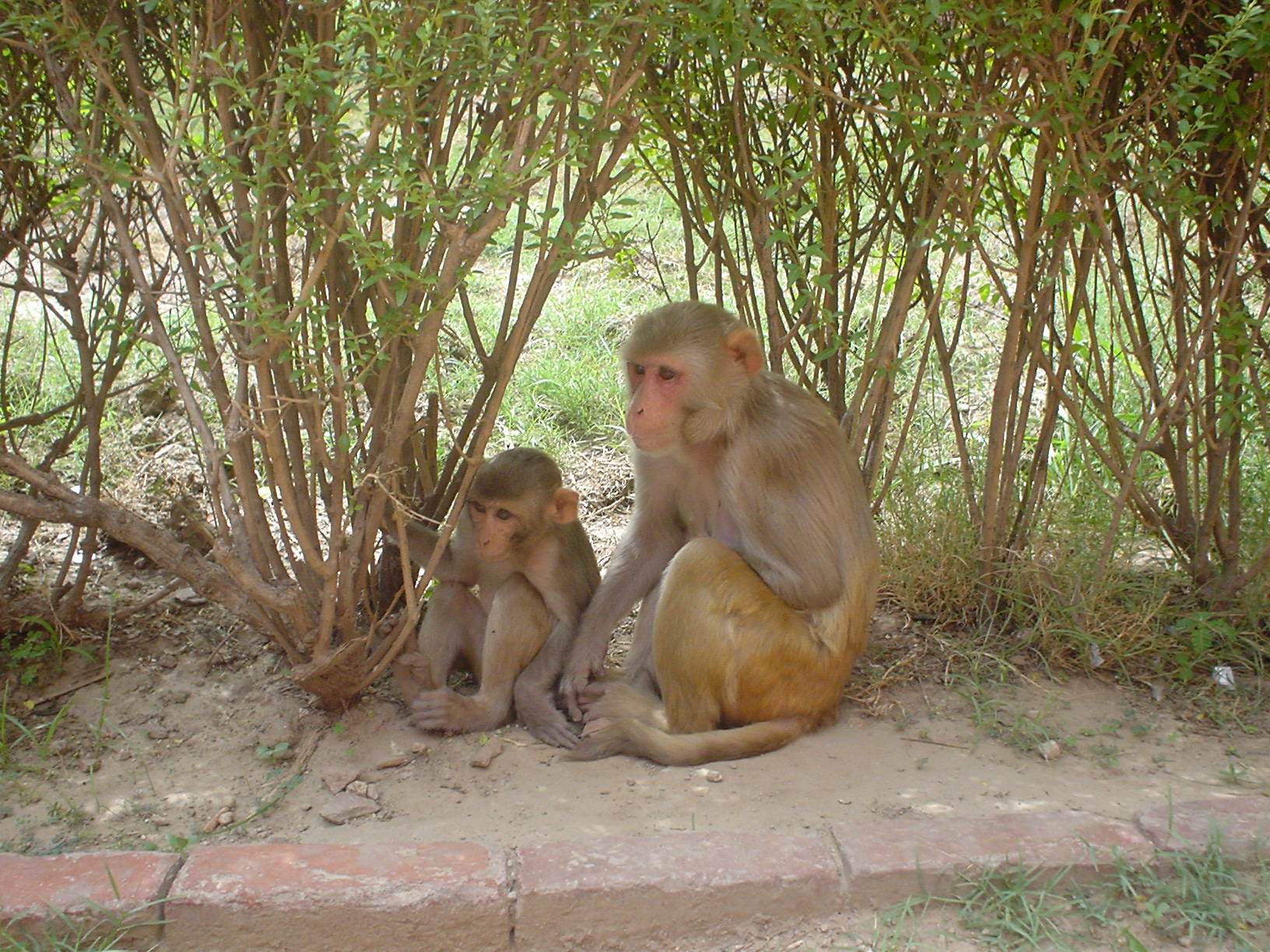
Rhesus macaque is the territorial animal of Islamabad

The order Primates contains humans and their closest relatives: lemurs, lorisoids, monkeys, and apes.

- Suborder: Haplorhini
  - Infraorder: Simiiformes
    - Parvorder: Catarrhini
      - Superfamily: Cercopithecoidea
        - Family: Cercopithecidae (Old World monkeys)
          - Genus: Macaca
            - Rhesus macaque, M. mulatta LC
          - Genus: Semnopithecus
            - Nepal gray langur, S. schistaceus LC
            - Northern plains gray langur, S. entellus LC

== Order: Rodentia (rodents) ==
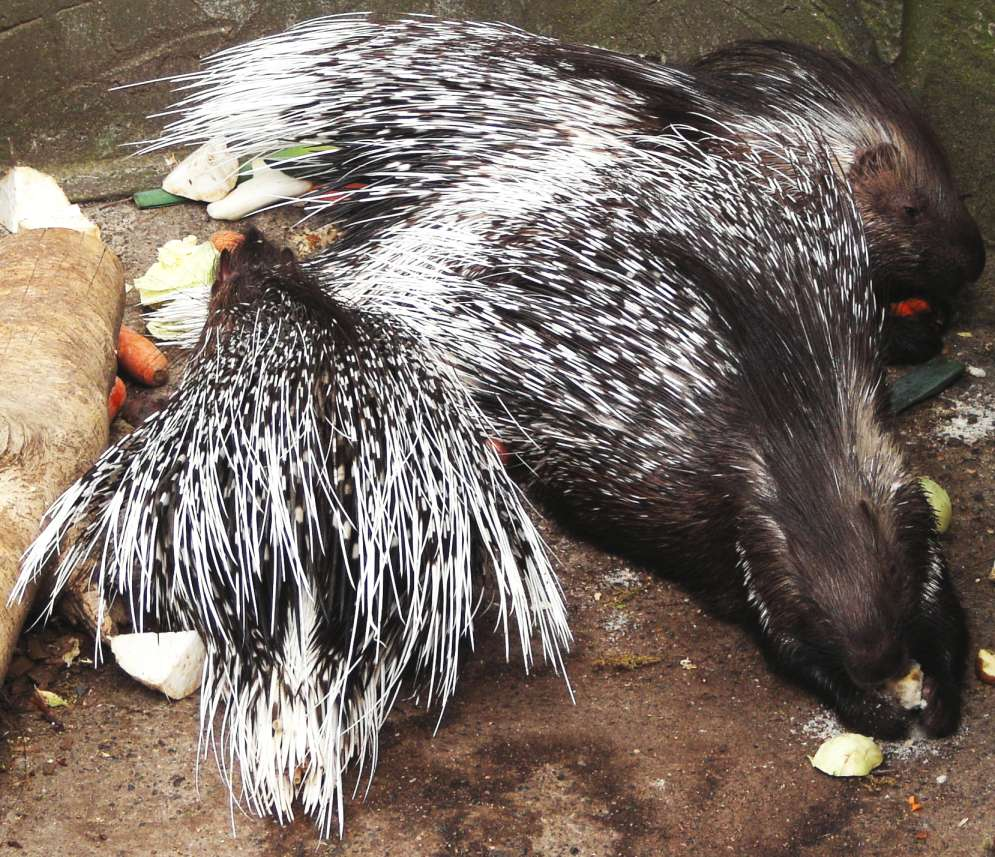
Indian crested porcupine

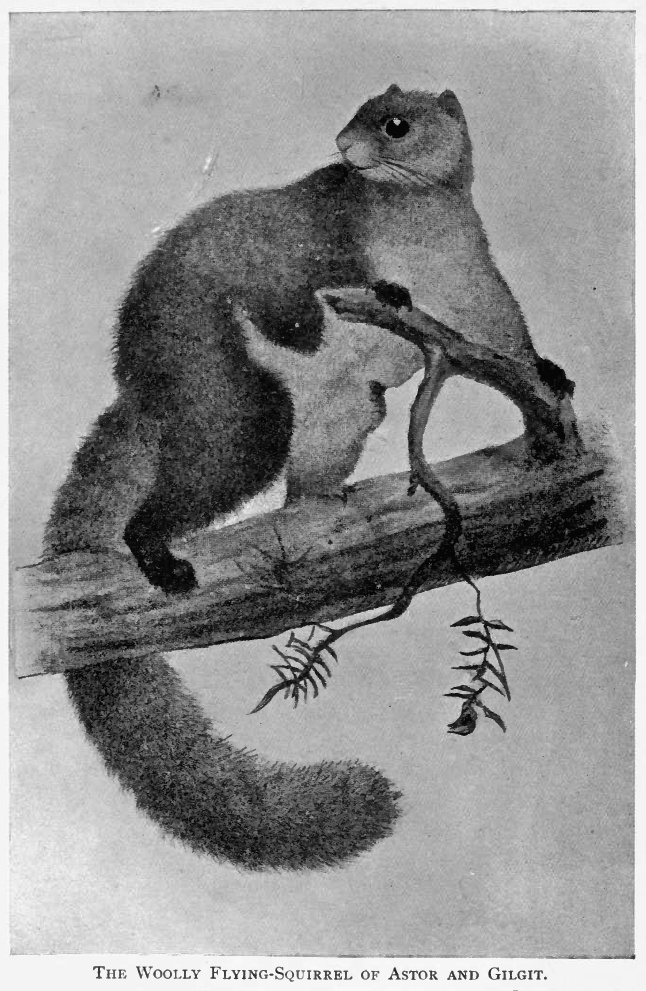
Woolly flying squirrel

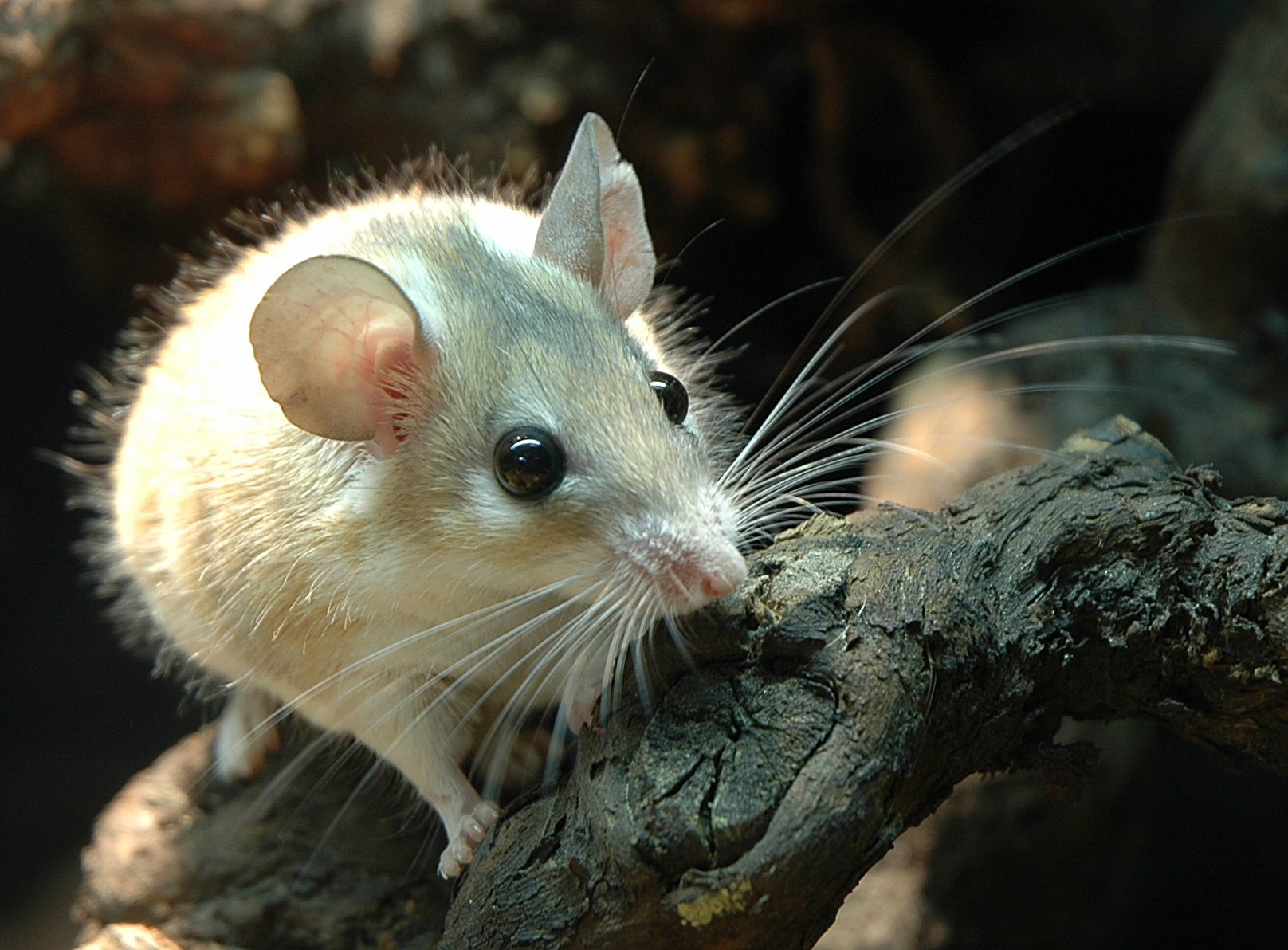
Acomys dimidiatus

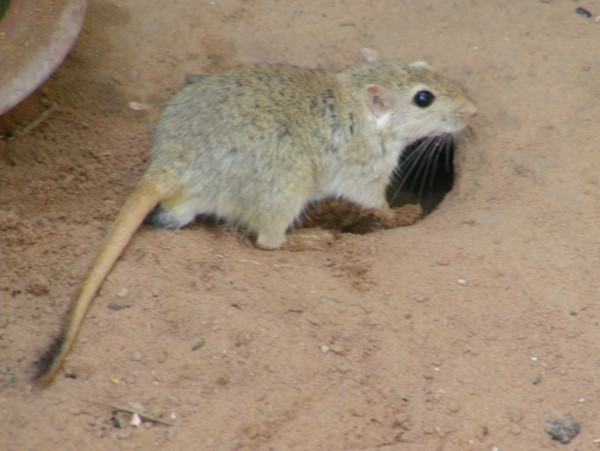
Indian desert jird

Rodents make up the largest order of mammals, with over 40% of mammalian species. They have two incisors in the upper and lower jaw which grow continually and must be kept short by gnawing. Most rodents are small though the capybara can weigh up to 45 kg (99 lb).

- Suborder: Hystricognathi
  - Family: Hystricidae (Old World porcupines)
    - Genus: Hystrix
      - Indian crested porcupine, H. indica LC
- Suborder: Sciurognathi
  - Family: Sciuridae (squirrels)
    - Subfamily: Sciurinae
      - Tribe: Pteromyini
        - Genus: Eoglaucomys
          - Kashmir flying squirrel, E. fimbriatus LC
        - Genus: Eupetaurus
          - Woolly flying squirrel, E. cinereus EN
        - Genus: Petaurista
          - Red giant flying squirrel, P. petaurista LC
    - Subfamily: Callosciurinae
      - Genus: Funambulus
        - Northern palm squirrel, F. pennantii LC
    - Subfamily: Xerinae
      - Tribe: Marmotini
        - Genus: Marmota
          - Long-tailed marmot, Marmota caudata LC
          - Himalayan marmot, Marmota himalayana LC
  - Family: Gliridae (dormice)
    - Subfamily: Leithiinae
      - Genus: Dryomys
        - Balochistan forest dormouse, Dryomys niethammeri VU
        - Forest dormouse, Dryomys nitedula LC
  - Family: Dipodidae (jerboas)
    - Subfamily: Allactaginae
      - Genus: Allactaga
        - Small five-toed jerboa, Allactaga elater LC
        - Hotson's jerboa, Allactaga hotsoni LC
    - Subfamily: Cardiocraniinae
      - Genus: Salpingotus
        - Baluchistan pygmy jerboa, Salpingotus michaelis LC
    - Subfamily: Dipodinae
      - Genus: Jaculus
        - Blanford's jerboa, Jaculus blanfordi LC
    - Subfamily: Sicistinae
      - Genus: Sicista
        - Chinese birch mouse, Sicista concolor LC
  - Family: Calomyscidae
    - Genus: Calomyscus
      - Baluchi mouse-like hamster, Calomyscus baluchi LC
      - Hotson's mouse-like hamster, Calomyscus hotsoni EN
  - Family: Cricetidae
    - Subfamily: Cricetinae
      - Genus: Cricetulus
        - Grey dwarf hamster, Cricetulus migratorius LC
    - Subfamily: Arvicolinae
      - Genus: Alticola
        - White-tailed mountain vole, Alticola albicauda LC
        - Silver mountain vole, Alticola argentatus LC
      - Genus: Ellobius
        - Southern mole vole, Ellobius fuscocapillus LC
      - Genus: Hyperacrius
        - True's vole, Hyperacrius fertilis LC
        - Murree vole, Hyperacrius wynnei LC
      - Genus: Microtus
        - Juniper vole, Microtus juldaschi LC
  - Family: Muridae (mice, rats, voles, gerbils, hamsters)
    - Subfamily: Deomyinae
      - Genus: Acomys
        - Arabian spiny mouse, Acomys dimidiatus LC
    - Subfamily: Gerbillinae
      - Genus: Gerbillus
        - Swarthy gerbil, Gerbillus aquilus LC
        - Indian hairy-footed gerbil, Gerbillus gleadowi
        - Balochistan gerbil, Gerbillus nanus LC
      - Genus: Meriones
        - Indian desert jird, Meriones hurrianae LC
        - Persian jird, Meriones persicus LC
        - Libyan jird, Meriones libycus LC
        - Sundevall's jird, Meriones crassus LC
      - Genus: Rhombomys
        - Great gerbil, Rhombomys opimus LC
      - Genus: Tatera
        - Indian gerbil, Tatera indica LC
    - Subfamily: Murinae
      - Genus: Apodemus
        - Kashmir field mouse, Apodemus rusiges LC
        - Ward's field mouse, Apodemus wardi LC
      - Genus: Bandicota
        - Lesser bandicoot rat, Bandicota bengalensis LC
      - Genus: Golunda
        - Indian bush rat, Golunda ellioti LC
      - Genus: Millardia
        - Sand-colored soft-furred rat, Millardia gleadowi LC
        - Soft-furred rat, Millardia meltada LC
      - Genus: Mus
        - Rock-loving mouse, M. saxicola LC
        - Earth-colored mouse, M. terricolor LC
        - House mouse, M. musculus LC
        - Rock-loving mouse, M. saxicola LC
      - Genus: Nesokia
        - Short-tailed bandicoot rat, N. indica LC
      - Genus: Niviventer
        - Chestnut white-bellied rat, N. fulvescens LC
      - Genus: Rattus
        - Turkestan rat, R. pyctorius LC
        - Black rat, R. rattus LC
        - Brown rat, R. norvegicus LC introduced

== Order: Lagomorpha (lagomorphs) ==
The lagomorphs comprise two families, Leporidae (hares and rabbits), and Ochotonidae (pikas). Though they can resemble rodents, and were classified as a superfamily in that order until the early 20th century, they have since been considered a separate order. They differ from rodents in a number of physical characteristics, such as having four incisors in the upper jaw rather than two.

- Family: Ochotonidae (pikas)
  - Genus: Ochotona
    - Ladak pika, O. ladacensis LC
    - Large-eared pika, O. macrotis LC
    - Royle's pika, O. roylei LC
    - Afghan pika, O. rufescens LC
- Family: Leporidae (rabbits, hares)
  - Genus: Lepus
    - Cape hare, L. capensis LC
    - Indian hare, L. nigricollis LC
    - Desert hare, L. tibetanus LC

== Order: Erinaceomorpha (hedgehogs and gymnures) ==
The order Erinaceomorpha contains a single family, Erinaceidae, which comprise the hedgehogs and gymnures. The hedgehogs are easily recognised by their spines while gymnures look more like large rats.

- Family: Erinaceidae (hedgehogs)
  - Subfamily: Erinaceinae
    - Genus: Hemiechinus
      - Long-eared hedgehog, H. auritus LC
      - Indian long-eared hedgehog, H. collaris LC
    - Genus: Paraechinus
      - Brandt's hedgehog, P. hypomelas LC
      - Indian hedgehog, P. micropus LC

== Order: Soricomorpha (shrews, moles, and solenodons) ==
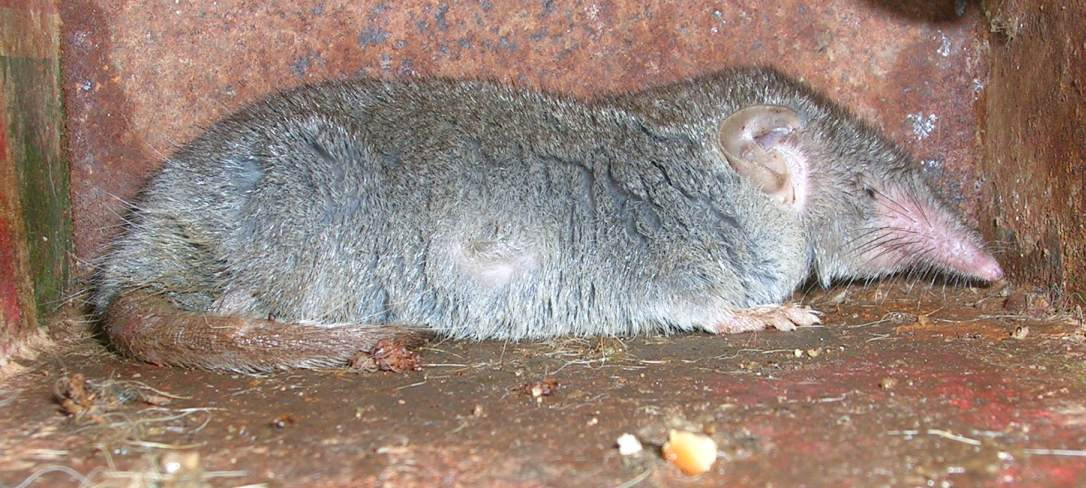
Asian house shrew

The "shrew-forms" are insectivorous mammals. The shrews and solenodons closely resemble mice while the moles are stout-bodied burrowers.

- Family: Soricidae (shrews)
  - Subfamily: Crocidurinae
    - Genus: Crocidura
      - Gmelin's white-toothed shrew, Crocidura gmelini LC
      - Pale gray shrew, Crocidura pergrisea DD
      - Asian gray shrew, Crocidura suaveolens
      - Zarudny's shrew, Crocidura zarudnyi LC
    - Genus: Suncus
      - Etruscan shrew, Suncus etruscus LC
      - Asian house shrew, S. murinus LC
      - Anderson's shrew, Suncus stoliczkanus LC
  - Subfamily: Soricinae
    - Tribe: Soricini
      - Genus: Sorex
        - Kashmir shrew, Sorex planiceps LC

== Order: Chiroptera (bats) ==
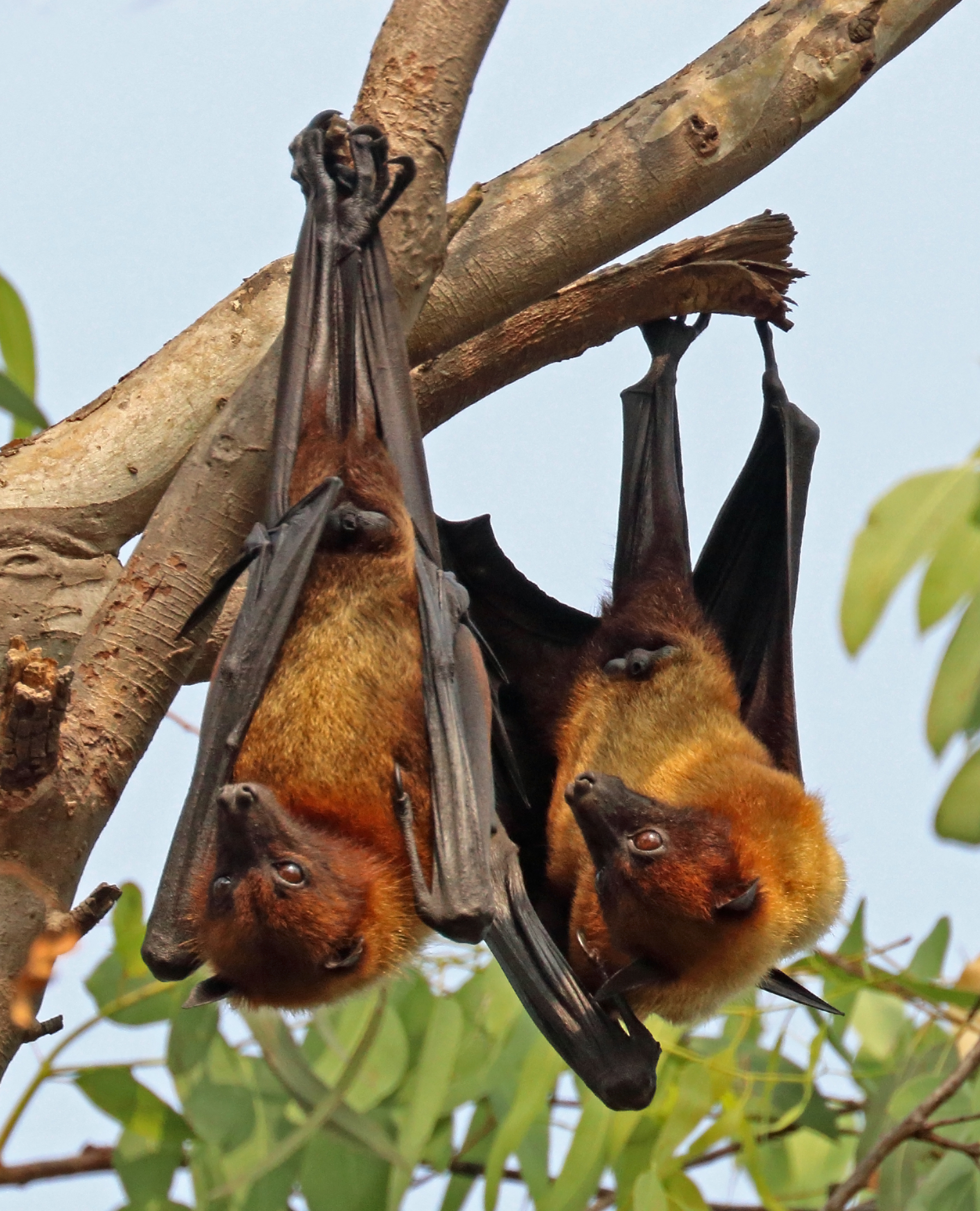
Indian flying fox

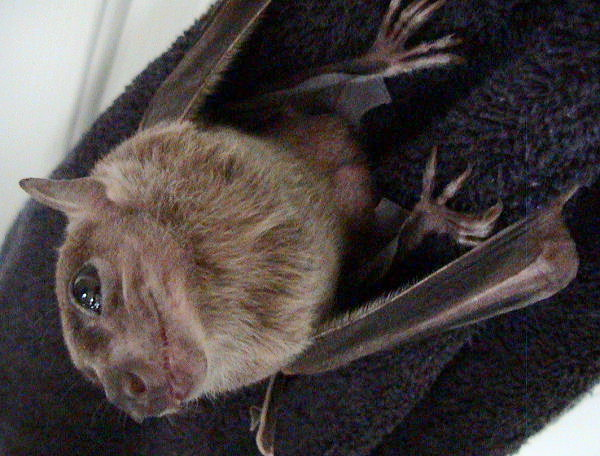
Egyptian fruit bat

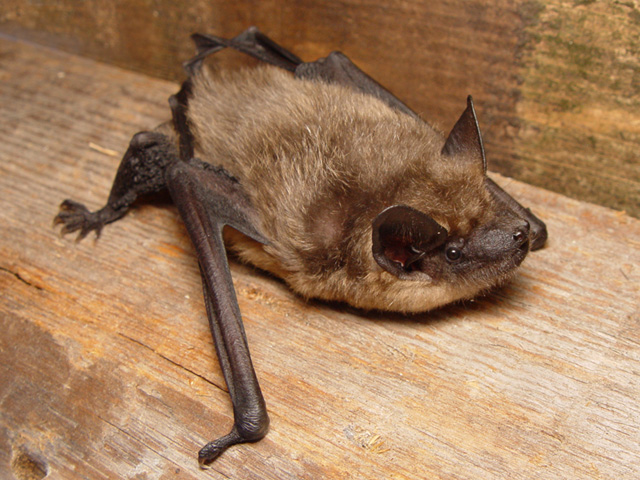
Serotine bat

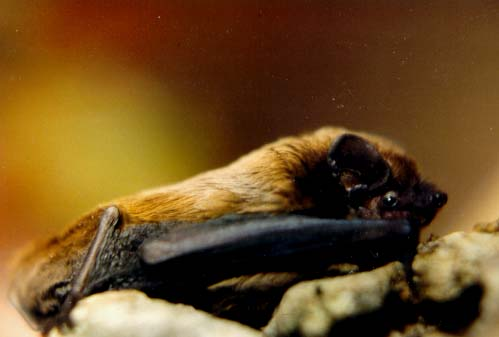
Lesser noctule

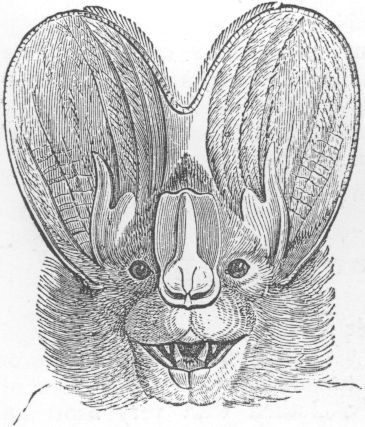
Megaderma lyra

The bats' most distinguishing feature is that their forelimbs are developed as wings, making them the only mammals capable of flight. Bat species account for about 20% of all mammals.

- Family: Pteropodidae (flying foxes, Old World fruit bats)
  - Subfamily: Pteropodinae
    - Genus: Pteropus
      - Indian flying fox, P. giganteus LC
    - Genus: Rousettus
      - Egyptian fruit bat, Rousettus aegyptiacus LC
      - Leschenault's rousette, Rousettus leschenaultii LC
- Family: Vespertilionidae
  - Subfamily: Myotinae
    - Genus: Myotis
      - Lesser mouse-eared bat, M. blythii LC
      - Whiskered myotis, Myotis muricola LC
      - Geoffroy's bat, M. emarginatus LC
      - Kashmir cave bat, Myotis longipes DD
  - Subfamily: Vespertilioninae
    - Genus: Barbastella
      - Eastern barbastelle, Barbastella leucomelas LC
    - Genus: Eptesicus
      - Botta's serotine, Eptesicus bottae LC
      - Gobi big brown bat, Eptesicus gobiensis LC
      - Serotine bat, Eptesicus serotinus LC
    - Genus: Nyctalus
      - Common noctule, N. noctula LC
      - Lesser noctule, N. leisleri LC
      - Mountain noctule, Nyctalus montanus LC
    - Genus: Otonycteris
      - Desert long-eared bat, Otonycteris hemprichii LC
    - Genus: Pipistrellus
      - Savi's pipistrelle, H. savii LC
      - Kelaart's pipistrelle, Pipistrellus ceylonicus LC
      - Indian pipistrelle, Pipistrellus coromandra LC
      - Java pipistrelle, Pipistrellus javanicus LC
      - Kuhl's pipistrelle, Pipistrellus kuhlii LC
      - Common pipistrelle, Pipistrellus pipistrellus LC
      - Least pipistrelle, Pipistrellus tenuis LC
    - Genus: Rhyneptesicus
      - Sind bat, R. nasutus LC
    - Genus: Scotoecus
      - Desert yellow bat, Scotoecus pallidus NT
    - Genus: Scotophilus
      - Greater Asiatic yellow bat, Scotophilus heathi LC
      - Lesser Asiatic yellow bat, Scotophilus kuhlii LC
    - Genus: Scotozous
      - Dormer's pipistrelle, Scotozous dormeri LC
  - Subfamily: Murininae
    - Genus: Murina
      - Hutton's tube-nosed bat, Murina huttoni LC
      - Scully's tube-nosed bat, Murina tubinaris LC
- Family: Rhinopomatidae
  - Genus: Rhinopoma
    - Lesser mouse-tailed bat, Rhinopoma hardwickei LC
    - Greater mouse-tailed bat, Rhinopoma microphyllum LC
    - Small mouse-tailed bat, Rhinopoma muscatellum LC
- Family: Emballonuridae
  - Genus: Taphozous
    - Naked-rumped tomb bat, Taphozous nudiventris LC
    - Egyptian tomb bat, Taphozous perforatus LC
- Family: Megadermatidae
  - Genus: Megaderma
    - Greater false vampire bat, Megaderma lyra LC
- Family: Rhinolophidae
  - Subfamily: Rhinolophinae
    - Genus: Rhinolophus
      - Blasius's horseshoe bat, R. blasii LC
      - Greater horseshoe bat, R. ferrumequinum LC
      - Lesser horseshoe bat, R. hipposideros LC
      - Blyth's horseshoe bat, Rhinolophus lepidus LC
      - Big-eared horseshoe bat, Rhinolophus macrotis LC
  - Subfamily: Hipposiderinae
    - Genus: Asellia
      - Trident leaf-nosed bat, Asellia tridens LC
    - Genus: Hipposideros
      - Ashy roundleaf bat, Hipposideros cineraceus LC
      - Fulvus roundleaf bat, Hipposideros fulvus LC
    - Genus: Triaenops
      - Rufous trident bat, Triaenops persicus LC
- Family: Molossidae
  - Genus: Tadarida
    - European free-tailed bat, T. teniotis LC

== Order: Pholidota (pangolins) ==
The order Pholidota comprises the eight species of pangolin. Pangolins are anteaters and have the powerful claws, elongated snout and long tongue seen in the other unrelated anteater species.

- Family: Manidae
  - Genus: Manis
    - Indian pangolin, M. crassicaudata EN

== Order: Cetacea (whales) ==
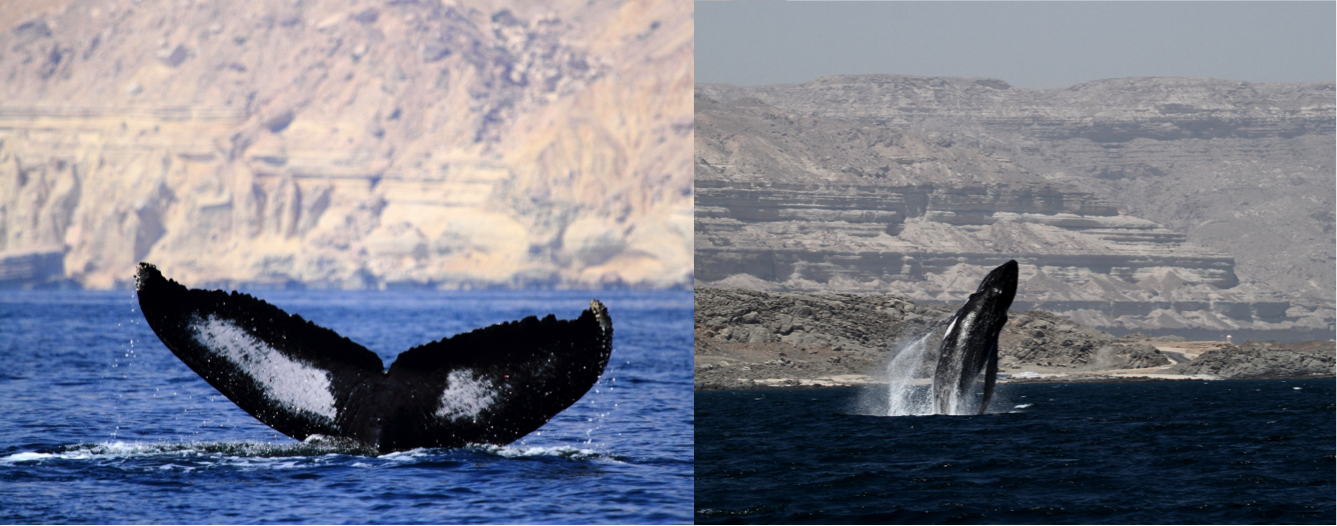
Arabian humpback whales

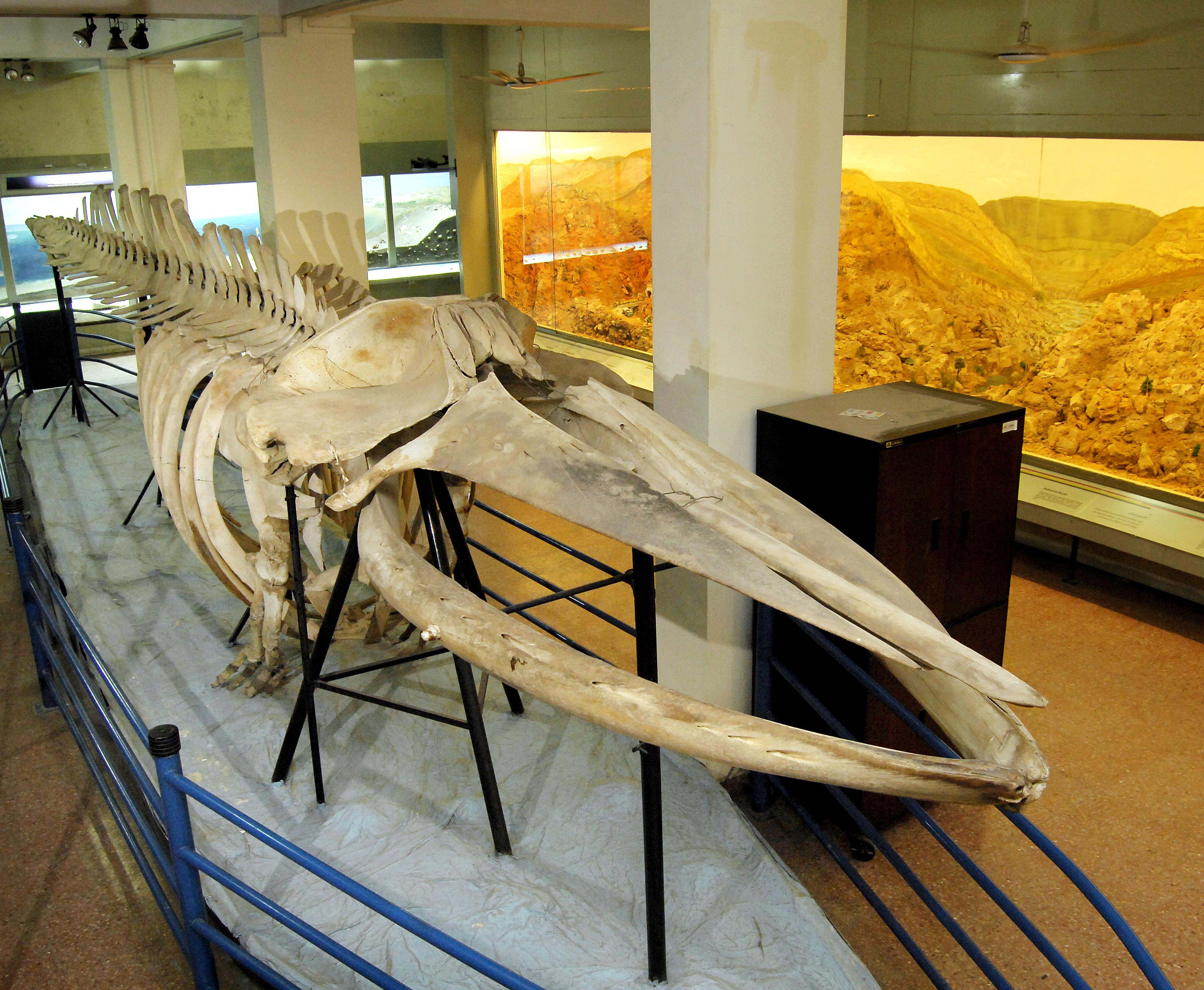
Pygmy blue whale skeleton at the Pakistan Museum of Natural History

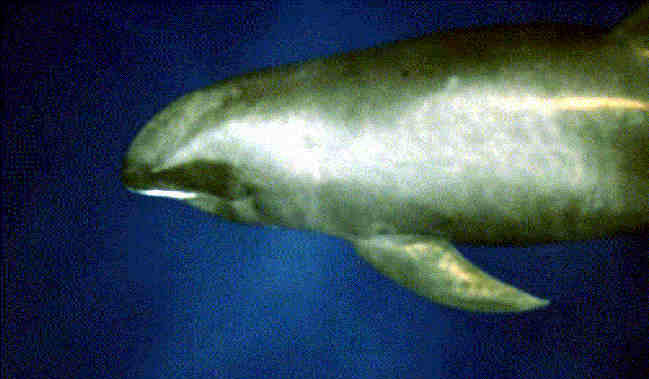
Melon-headed whale

Indus river dolphin

The order Cetacea includes whales, dolphins and porpoises. They are the mammals most fully adapted to aquatic life with a spindle-shaped nearly hairless body, protected by a thick layer of blubber, and forelimbs and tail modified to provide propulsion underwater.

- Suborder: Mysticeti
  - Family: Balaenopteridae
    - Subfamily: Balaenopterinae
      - Genus: Balaenoptera
        - Bryde's whale, Balaenoptera edeni DD
        - Pygmy blue whale, Balaenoptera musculus brevicauda EN
        - Fin whale, Balaenoptera physalus EN
    - Subfamily: Megapterinae
      - Genus: Megaptera
        - Humpback whale, M. novaeangliae LC
- Suborder: Odontoceti
  - Superfamily: Platanistoidea
    - Family: Platanistidae
      - Genus: Platanista
        - Indus river dolphin, P. minor EN
    - Family: Phocoenidae
      - Genus: Neophocaena
        - Finless porpoise, Neophocaena phocaenoides DD
    - Family: Kogiidae
      - Genus: Kogia
        - Pygmy sperm whale, K. breviceps DD
        - Dwarf sperm whale, Kogia sima LC
    - Family: Physeteridae
      - Genus: Physeter
        - Sperm whale, Physeter macrocephalus VU
    - Family: Ziphidae
      - Subfamily: Hyperoodontinae
        - Genus: Mesoplodon
          - Blainville's beaked whale, Mesoplodon densirostris DD
          - Ginkgo-toothed beaked whale, Mesoplodon ginkgodens DD
    - Family: Delphinidae (marine dolphins)
      - Genus: Steno
        - Rough-toothed dolphin, Steno bredanensis DD
      - Genus: Sousa
        - Indo-Pacific humback dolphin, Sousa chinensis
      - Genus: Tursiops
        - Indo-Pacific bottlenose dolphin, Tursiops aduncus
        - Common bottlenose dolphin, Tursiops truncatus
      - Genus: Stenella
        - Spinner dolphin, Stenella longirostris LC
      - Genus: Delphinus
        - Common dolphin, Delphinus capensis LC
      - Genus: Lagenodelphis
        - Fraser's dolphin, Lagenodelphis hosei DD
      - Genus: Grampus
        - Risso's dolphin, Grampus griseus DD
      - Genus: Peponocephala
        - Melon-headed whale, Peponocephala electra LC
      - Genus: Feresa
        - Pygmy killer whale, Feresa attenuata DD
      - Genus: Orcinus
        - Orca, O. orca DD

== Order: Carnivora (carnivorans) ==
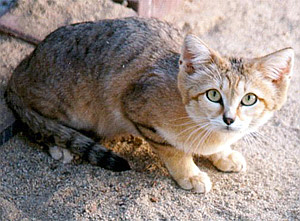
Sand cat

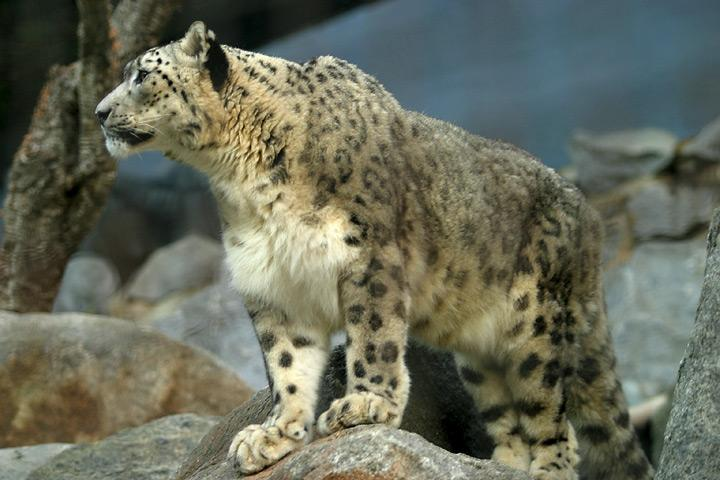
Snow leopard, state animal of Pakistan

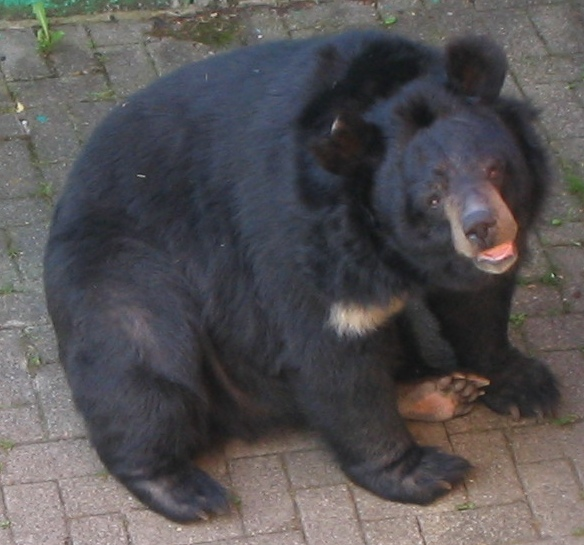
Asiatic black bear

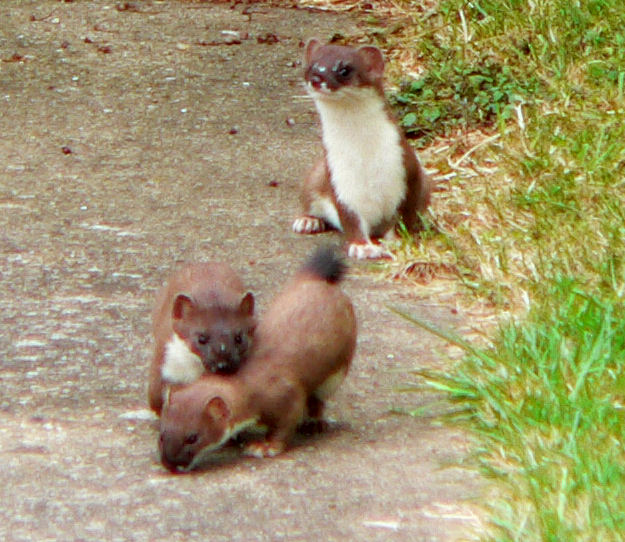
Stoat

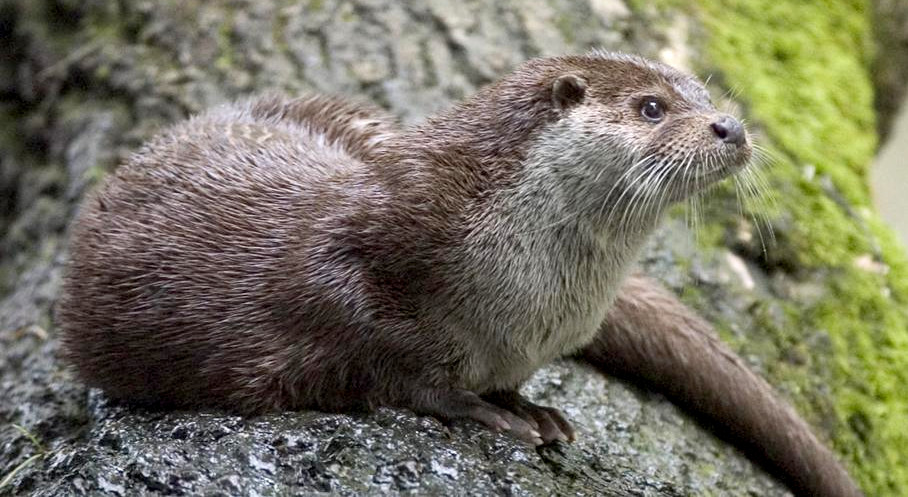
European otter

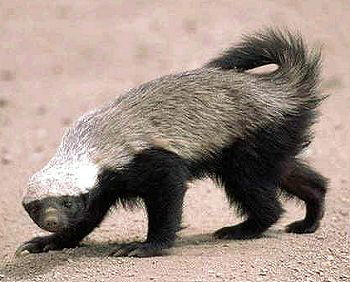
Honey badger

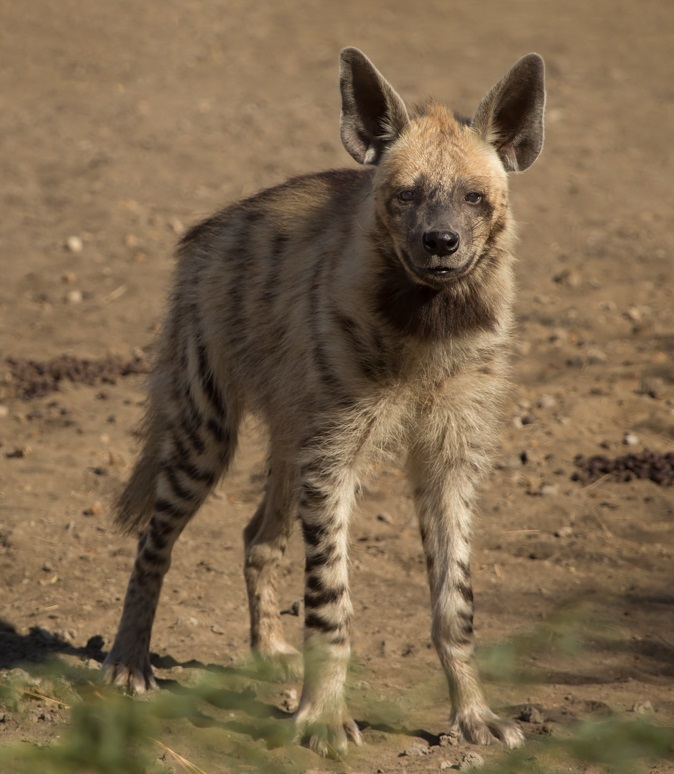
Striped hyena

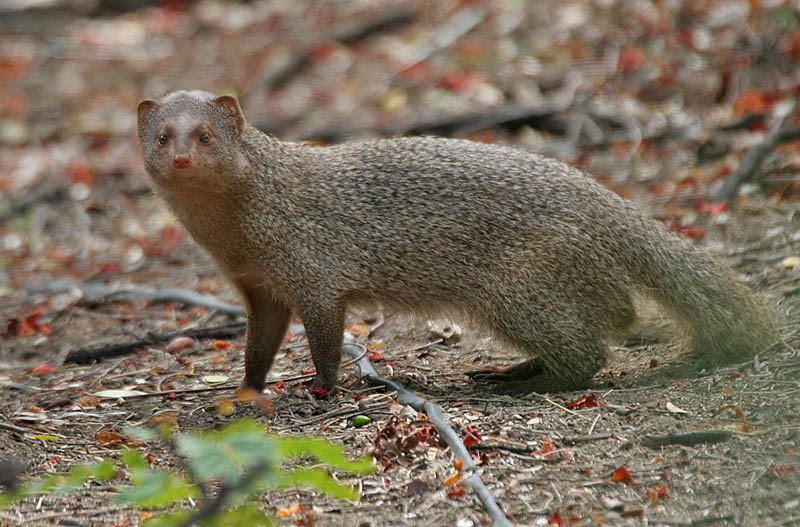
Indian grey mongoose

There are over 260 species of carnivorans, the majority of which eat meat as their primary dietary item. They have a characteristic skull shape and dentition.

- Suborder: Feliformia
  - Family: Felidae (cats)
    - Subfamily: Felinae
      - Genus: Caracal
        - Caracal, C. caracal LC
      - Genus: Felis
        - Jungle cat, F. chaus LC
        - African wildcat, F. lybica LC
          - Asiatic wildcat, F. l. ornata
        - Sand cat, F. margarita LC possibly extirpated
          - Turkestan sand cat, F. m. thinobia possibly extirpated
      - Genus: Lynx
        - Eurasian lynx, L. lynx LC
      - Genus: Otocolobus
        - Pallas's cat, O. manul LC
      - Genus: Prionailurus
        - Leopard cat, P. bengalensis LC
        - Fishing cat, P. viverrinus VU
    - Subfamily: Pantherinae
      - Genus: Panthera
        - Leopard P. pardus VU
          - Indian leopard, P. p. fusca
          - Persian leopard, P. p. tulliana
        - Snow leopard, P. uncia VU
  - Family: Viverridae
    - Subfamily: Paradoxurinae
      - Genus: Paguma
        - Masked palm civet, P. larvata LC
    - Subfamily: Viverrinae
      - Genus: Viverricula
        - Small Indian civet, V. indica LC
  - Family: Herpestidae (mongooses)
    - Genus: Urva
      - Indian grey mongoose, U. edwardsii LC
      - Small Indian mongoose, U. auropunctatus LC
  - Family: Hyaenidae (hyaenas)
    - Genus: Hyaena
      - Striped hyena, H. hyaena NT
- Suborder: Caniformia
  - Family: Canidae (dogs, foxes)
    - Genus: Canis
      - Golden jackal, C. aureus LC
        - Persian jackal, C. a. aureus
      - Gray wolf, C. lupus LC
        - Eurasian wolf, C. l. lupus
        - Indian wolf, C. l. pallipes
    - Genus: Cuon
      - Dhole, C. alpinus EN presence uncertain
    - Genus: Vulpes
      - Bengal fox, V. bengalensis LC
      - Blanford's fox, V. cana LC
      - Rüppell's fox, V. rueppellii LC
      - Red fox, V. vulpes LC
  - Family: Ursidae (bears)
    - Genus: Ursus
      - Brown bear, U. arctos LC
        - Himalayan brown bear, U. a. isabellinus CR
      - Asiatic black bear, U. thibetanus VU
        - Balochistan black bear, U. t. gedrosianus
        - Himalayan black bear, U. t. laniger
  - Family: Mustelidae (mustelids)
    - Genus: Lutra
      - European otter, L. lutra NT
    - Genus: Lutrogale
      - Smooth-coated otter, L. perspicillata VU
    - Genus: Martes
      - Yellow-throated marten, M. flavigula LC
      - Beech marten, M. foina LC
    - Genus: Mellivora
      - Honey badger, M. capensis LC
    - Genus: Mustela
      - Mountain weasel, M. altaica NT
      - Stoat, M. erminea LC
    - Genus: Vormela
      - Marbled polecat, V. peregusna VU

== Order: Artiodactyla (even-toed ungulates) ==
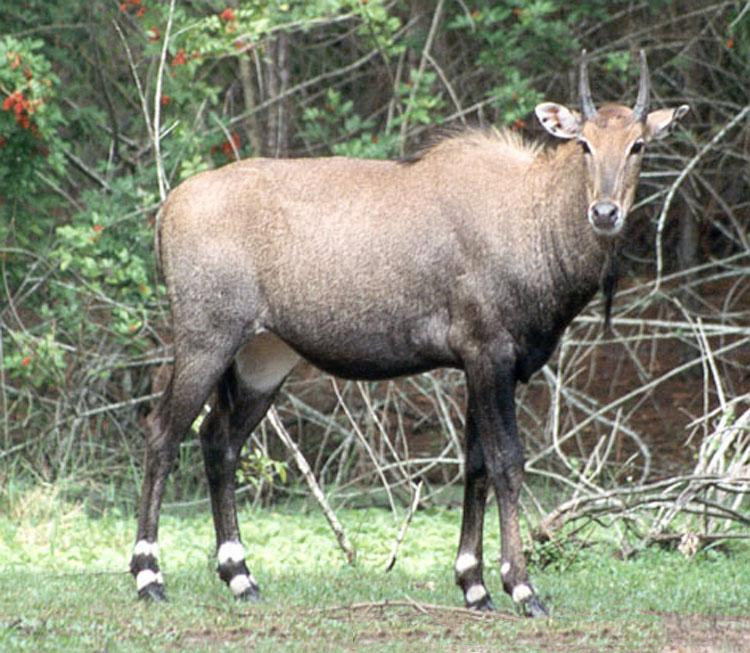
Nilgai

Chinkara

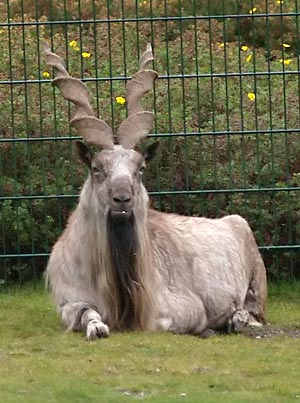
Markhor, the national animal of Pakistan

The even-toed ungulates are ungulates whose weight is borne about equally by the third and fourth toes, rather than mostly or entirely by the third as in perissodactyls. There are about 220 artiodactyl species, including many that are of great economic importance to humans.

- Family: Moschidae
  - Genus: Moschus
    - Kashmir musk deer, M. cupreus EN
- Family: Cervidae (deer)
  - Subfamily: Cervinae
    - Genus: Axis
      - Chital, A. axis, introduced LC
      - Indian hog deer, A. porcinus EN
    - Genus: Rusa
      - Sambar deer, R. unicolor VU
    - Genus: Muntiacus
      - Indian muntjac, M. muntjak LC
- Family: Bovidae (cattle, antelope, sheep, goats)
  - Subfamily: Antilopinae
    - Genus: Gazella
      - Chinkara, G. bennettii LC
      - Goitered gazelle, G. subgutturosa VU
  - Subfamily: Bovinae
    - Genus: Boselaphus
      - Nilgai, B. tragocamelus LC
  - Subfamily: Caprinae
    - Genus: Capra
      - Wild goat, C. aegagrus NT
        - Sindh ibex, C. a. blythi
        - Chiltan ibex, C. a. chialtanensis
      - Markhor, C. falconeri NT
      - Siberian ibex, C. sibrica NT
    - Genus: Nemorhaedus
      - Himalayan goral, N. goral NT
    - Genus: Ovis
      - Argali, O. ammon NT
        - Marco Polo sheep, O. a. polii
      - Urial, O. vignei VU
        - Punjab urial, O. v. punjabiensis
        - Baluchistan urial, O. v. blanfordi
        - Ladakh urial, O. v. vignei
        - Ustyurt Mountain sheep, O. v. cycloceros
    - Genus: Pseudois
      - Bharal, P. nayaur LC
- Family: Suidae (pigs)
  - Subfamily: Suinae
    - Genus: Sus
      - Wild boar, S. scrofa LC

== Order: Perissodactyla (odd-toed ungulates) ==
- Family: Equidae
  - Genus: Equus
    - Onager, E. hemionus NT presence uncertain
    - Kiang, E. kiang LC

== Locally extinct ==
The following species are locally extinct in the country:

- Cheetah, Acinonyx jubatus
- Blackbuck, Antilope cervicapra (extinct in wild)
- Central Asian red deer, Cervus hanglu (possibly locally extinct)
- Asian elephant, Elephas maximus
- Indian wild ass Equus hemionus
- Lion, Panthera leo
- Tiger, Panthera tigris
- Indian rhinoceros, Rhinoceros unicornis
- Barasingha, Rucervus duvaucelii

== See also ==
- List of endangered species in Pakistan
- List of chordate orders
- Lists of mammals by region
- Mammal classification
