= Chiltan ibex =

Scientific classification
- Kingdom: Animalia
- Phylum: Chordata
- Class: Mammalia
- Order: Artiodactyla
- Family: Bovidae
- Subfamily: Caprinae
- Genus: Capra
- Species: C. aegagrus
- Subspecies: C. a. chialtanensis

Trinomial name
- Capra aegagrus chialtanensis Lydekker, 1913

Subspecies of wild goat

The Chiltan ibex or Chiltan goat (Capra aegagrus chialtanensis) is a wild goat endemic to Chiltan, Balochistan, Pakistan.

== Description ==
Males are reddish-gray in color. Some males have dark brown or black chests, sometimes a dark shoulder stripe (like Bezoar ibex). Females are reddish-gray with a dark brown dorsal stripe and white legs with a dark brown marking below the knees. Its horns are similar to those of Bezoar ibex; they are flat and sharply curved at front and form a long, open spiral that. Their horns reach a length of 29 inches (73.7 cm), however, the longest of record measured 40 inches (101.6 cm).

== Distribution and preservation ==
There were four to five populations in the early 1970s in Chiltan, Mordar, Koh-i-Maran and Koh-i-Gishk. By 1975, the uncontrolled hunting by locals reduced population to 170 in Sulaiman Mountains area (now Hazarganji-Chiltan National Park). By 1990, the population was increased by 480. As of 2023, the population of Chiltan ibex had grown to 2,250 individuals.
