= Afghan hedgehog =

Scientific classification
- Domain: Eukaryota
- Kingdom: Animalia
- Phylum: Chordata
- Class: Mammalia
- Order: Eulipotyphla
- Family: Erinaceidae
- Genus: Hemiechinus
- Species: H. auritus
- Subspecies: H. a. megalotis

Trinomial name
- Hemiechinus auritus megalotis (Blyth, 1845)

Subspecies of hedgehog

The Afghan hedgehog (Hemiechinus auritus megalotis) is a subspecies of the long-eared hedgehog native to Afghanistan and western Pakistan. It is larger and reddish in colour, but otherwise similar in appearance to the long-eared hedgehog.

At 23–28 cm long and 700 to 900 grams of weight, the Afghan hedgehog is roughly the size of the West European hedgehog. Since the Afghan hedgehog occupies mostly mountainous areas, are abundant at 1000 meters, and often found as high as 2500 meters, thus living at the highest elevation among hedgehog species, lower temperatures probably made it evolve larger. It also hibernates for approximately six months. Another adaptation for mountain terrain that this subspecies possesses long claws on its legs, which are more suitable for climbing.

The Afghan hedgehog is common in its habitat. It preys on insects, snakes, and scorpions, but also prefers melons, watermelons, and berries. Because of its passion for melons, it is often considered a pest. The Afghan hedgehog is also a capable hole-digger, even in rough terrain.
