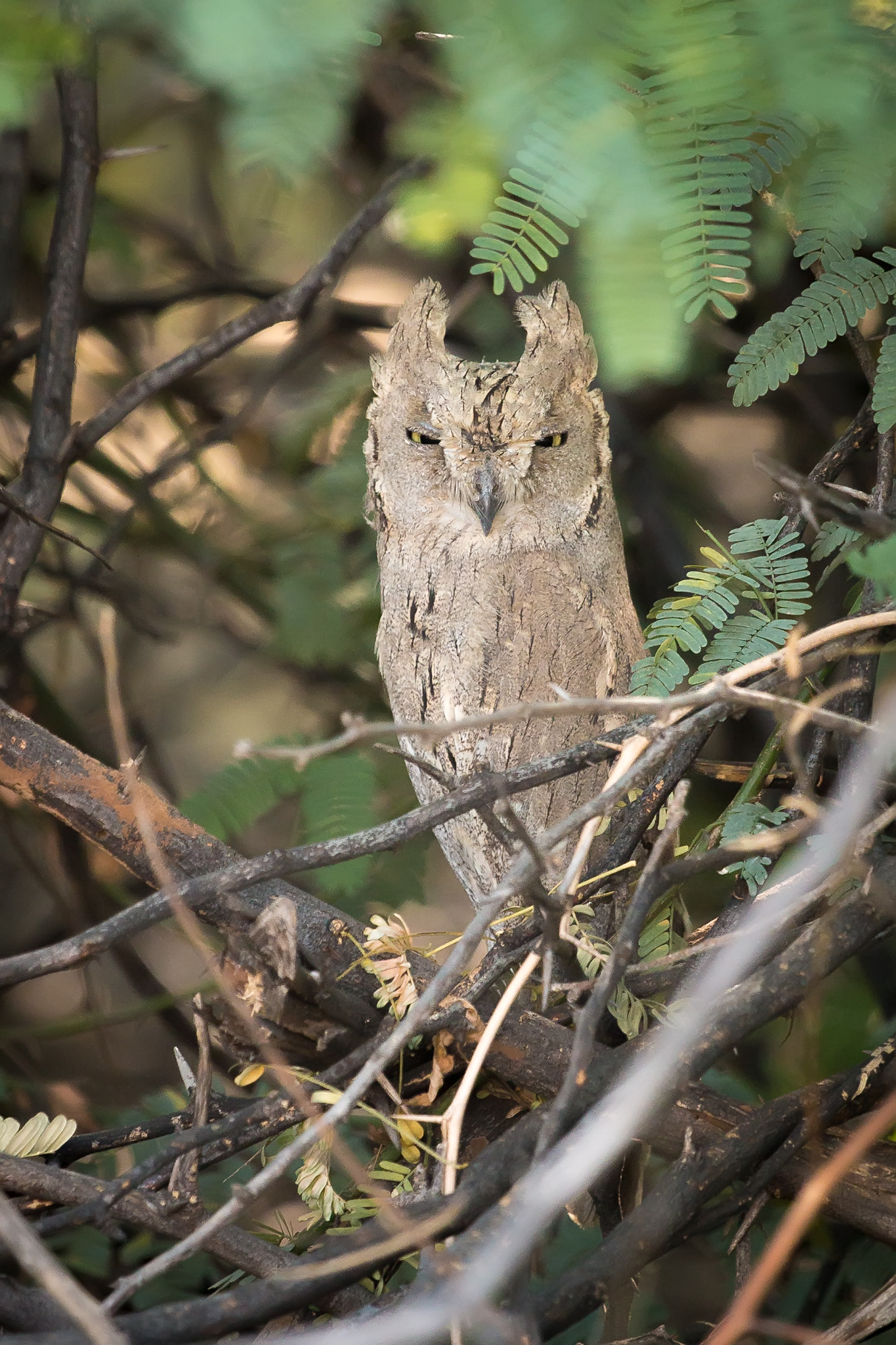
- Individual at the Little Rann of Kutch

Conservation status
- Least Concern (IUCN 3.1)
- CITES Appendix II

Scientific classification
- Kingdom: Animalia
- Phylum: Chordata
- Class: Aves
- Order: Strigiformes
- Family: Strigidae
- Genus: Otus
- Species: O. brucei

Binomial name
- Otus brucei (Hume, 1872)

Subspecies
- O.b. brucei O.b. obsoletus O.b. semenowi O.b. exiguus

= Pallid scops owl =

Species of owl

The pallid scops owl (Otus brucei) is a small scops owl ranging from the Middle East to west and central Asia, sometimes called the striated scops owl.

== Description ==
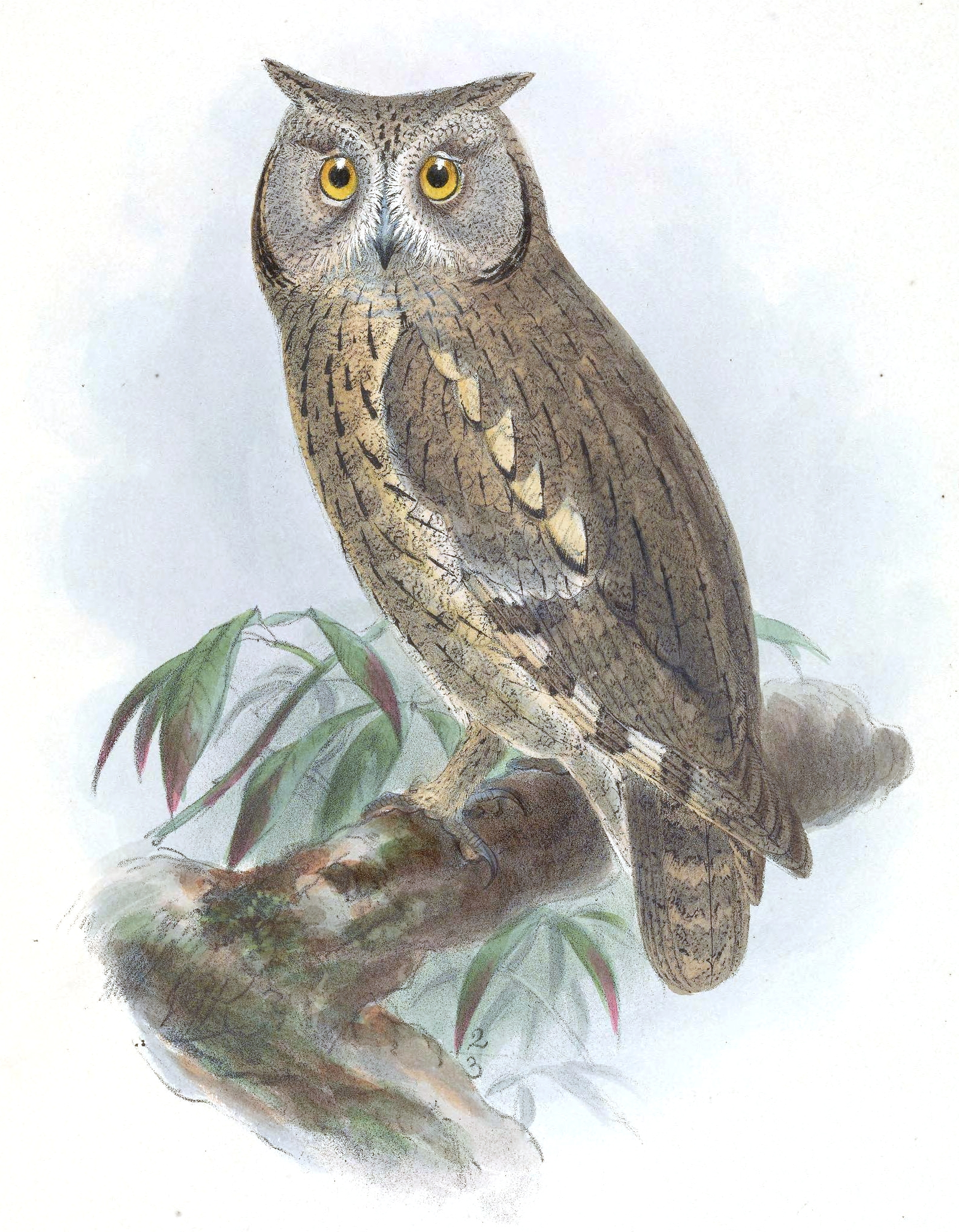
A field guide illustration

The pallid scops owl is a small-eared owl similar in appearance to the Eurasian scops owl but with more distinct streaks on the back and less intricate markings.

== Distribution and habitat ==
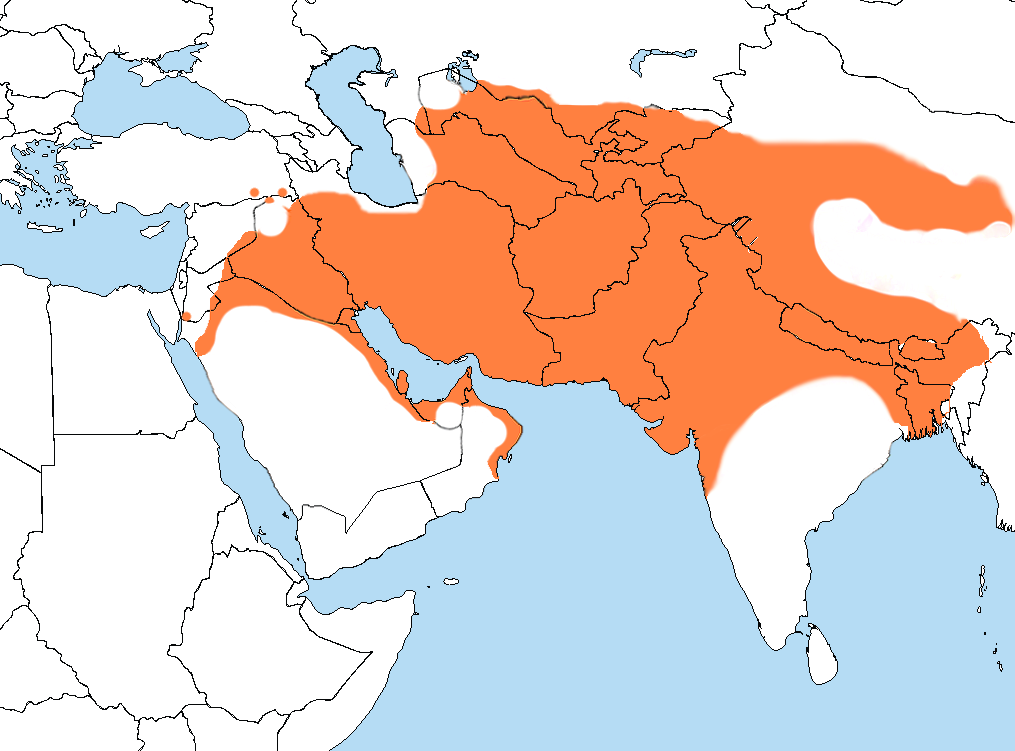
Breeding distribution of Otus brucei

The pallid scops owl ranges from the Middle East to west and central Asia, with some populations migrating as far as the Arabian Peninsula, Egypt, and Pakistan in the winter. It inhabits semi-open country with trees and bushes and has an estimated range of 6,190,000 km^{2} (2,390,000 mi^{2}) during the breeding season and 3,560,000 km^{2} (1,370,000 mi^{2}) in the nonbreeding season.

in 2015, a new population of over 400 pairs was found in the Rift Valley, Israel and in 2016 more pairs and nests were found in Jordan (east to the Jordan River), all nesting in palm plantations.

There have been many records from the states of Gujarat, Madhya Pradesh and Rajasthan in India, and a single record of this species from paddyfields in the southern state of Kerala.

== Behavior ==
=== Diet ===
Primarily an insectivore, the pallid scops owl's diet includes insects, lizards, spiders, and small mammals. It occasionally hunts during the day, and has been known to take bats and insects on the wing.

=== Nesting ===
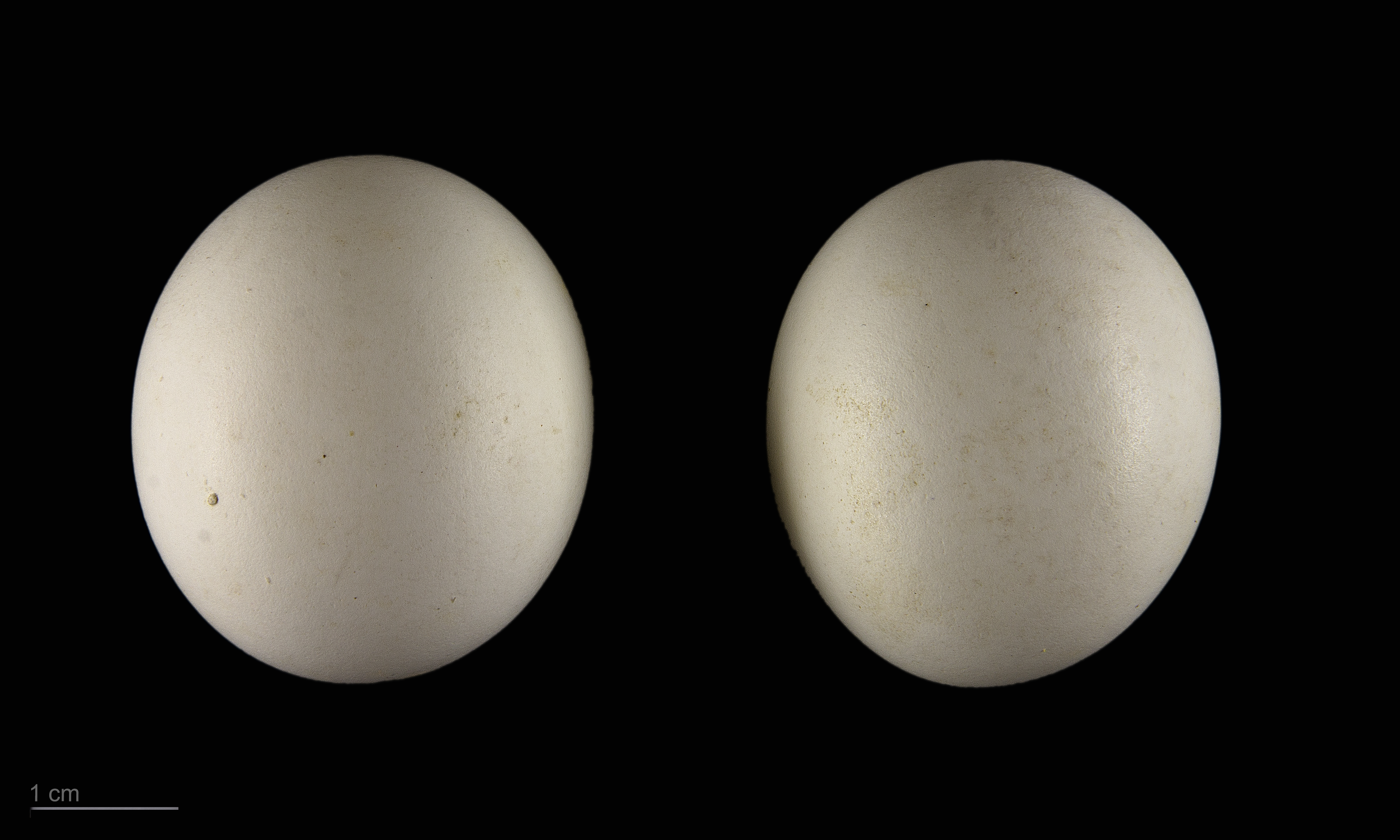
Otus brucei - MHNT

Breeding takes place any time between April and June, where 4 to 6 eggs are laid in a tree cavity, such as a woodpecker hole. Incubation takes approximately 27 days, and the juveniles are fledged at 30 days.

=== Voice ===
The pallid scops owl's call is a series of low, hollow, dove-like notes.
