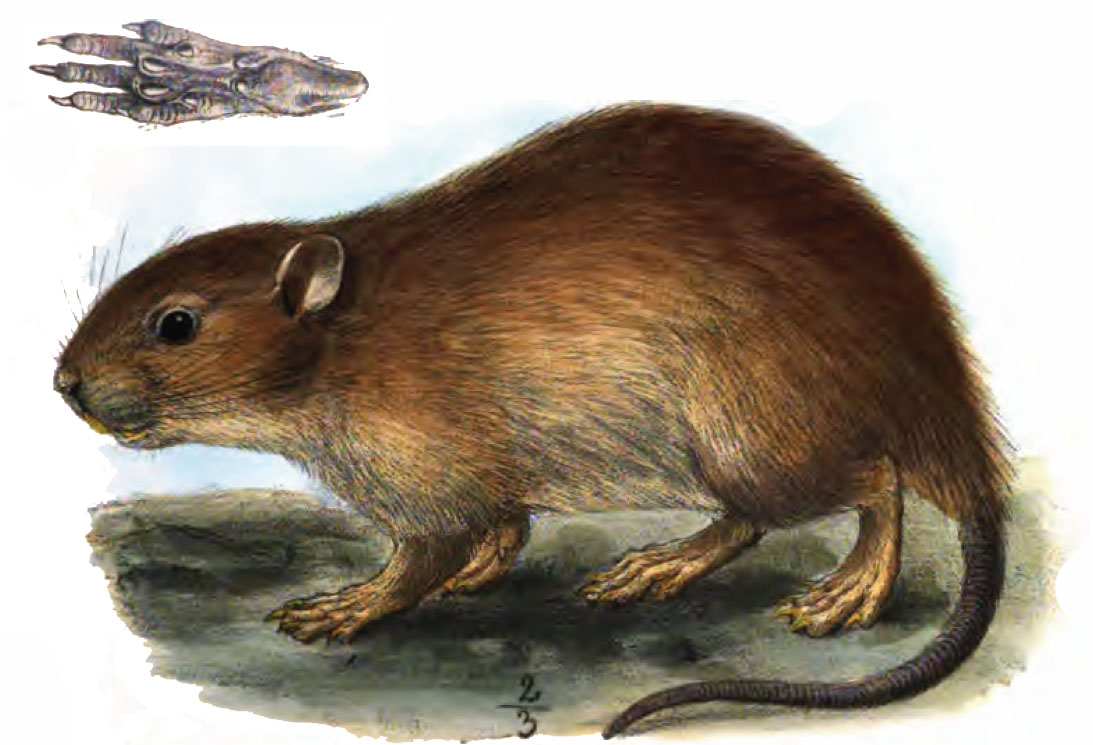

Conservation status
- Least Concern (IUCN 3.1)

Scientific classification
- Kingdom: Animalia
- Phylum: Chordata
- Class: Mammalia
- Order: Rodentia
- Family: Muridae
- Genus: Nesokia
- Species: N. indica

Binomial name
- Nesokia indica (Gray, 1830)

Synonyms
- Nesokia bacheri Nehring, 1897; Nesokia bailwardi Thomas, 1907; Nesokia beaba Wroughton, 1908; Nesokia boettgeri Radde and Walter, 1889; Nesokia brachyura Büchner, 1889; Nesokia buxtoni Thomas, 1919; Nesokia chitralensis Schlitter and Setzer, 1973; Nesokia dukelskiana Heptner, 1928; Nesokia griffithi Horsfield, 1851; Nesokia hardwickei (Gray, 1837); Nesokia huttoni (Blyth, 1846); Nesokia indicus (Peters, 1860); Nesokia insularis Goodwin, 1940; Nesokia legendrei Goodwin, 1939; Nesokia myosura (Wagner, 1845); Nesokia satunini Nehring, 1899; Nesokia scullyi Wood-Mason, 1876; Nesokia suilla (Thomas, 1907)

= Short-tailed bandicoot rat =

Species of rodent

The short-tailed bandicoot rat (Nesokia indica) is a species of rodent in the family Muridae. Other common names include short-tailed mole-rat, Indian bandicoot, bandicoot-rat, flat-tooth rat and short-tailed nesokia.

== Characteristics ==
The short-tailed bandicoot rat is generally brown on the upper parts and lighter on the underside, sometimes with a white patch on the throat. It has long, dense and soft hair in the winter, but the hair is short, sparse and stubbly in the summer. The broad feet and the tail are scantily haired. The forefeet have four functional digits and the hind feet have five, each with a strong, nearly straight claw. The body size varies between 182 and 388 g, and the length between 165 and 218 mm.

== Distribution ==
The short-tailed bandicoot rat lives in river valleys, by lake sides, in irrigated lands and oases in Asia and North Africa, from Xinjiang (China) in the east to Egypt in the west, to Uzbekistan in the north and to Bangladesh in the south.

== Biology ==
The short-tailed bandicoot rat is a nocturnal rodent and spends most of its time in a burrow which comprises many tunnels and chambers. The depths may be up to 60 cm and the burrow may be up to 9 m long, covering an area of up to 120 m^{2}. One chamber is lined with vegetation for nesting. The gestation period is believed to be about 17 days. There are three generations per year, with three to five pups in each litter. Breeding starts in March and may continue all year round in regions where the winters are warm.

== Ecology ==
The short-tailed bandicoot rat is common and can reach high numbers under favorable conditions. It prefers damp places and does considerable damage to agricultural crops by its burrowing activities. It feeds on grasses, grains, roots and cultivated fruit and vegetables. It makes tunnels in walls of irrigation canals and can cause leaks and flooding. It has many predators, including jackals, foxes, jungle cats, polecats, weasels, snakes and domestic cats and dogs.
