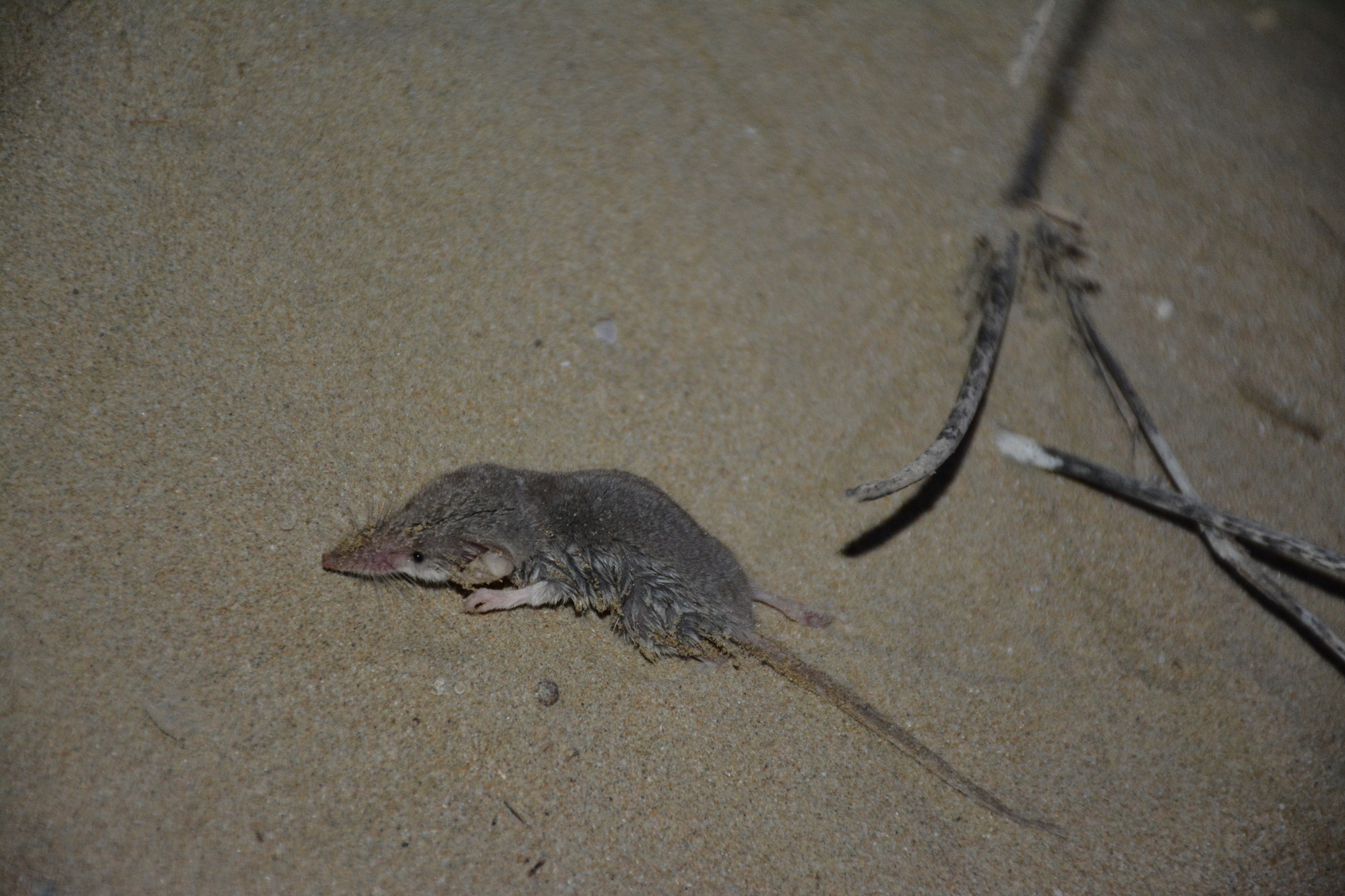

Conservation status
- Least Concern (IUCN 3.1)

Scientific classification
- Kingdom: Animalia
- Phylum: Chordata
- Class: Mammalia
- Order: Eulipotyphla
- Family: Soricidae
- Genus: Crocidura
- Species: C. zarudnyi

Binomial name
- Crocidura zarudnyi Ognev, 1928
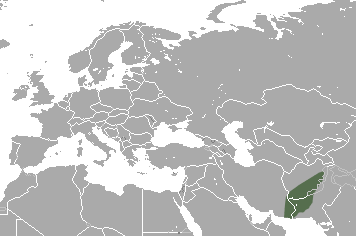
- Zarudny's Rock Shrew range

= Zarudny's rock shrew =

Zarudny's Rock Shrew

Species of mammal

Zarudny's rock shrew (Crocidura zarudnyi) is a species of mammal in the family Soricidae. It is found in Afghanistan, Iran, and Pakistan.
