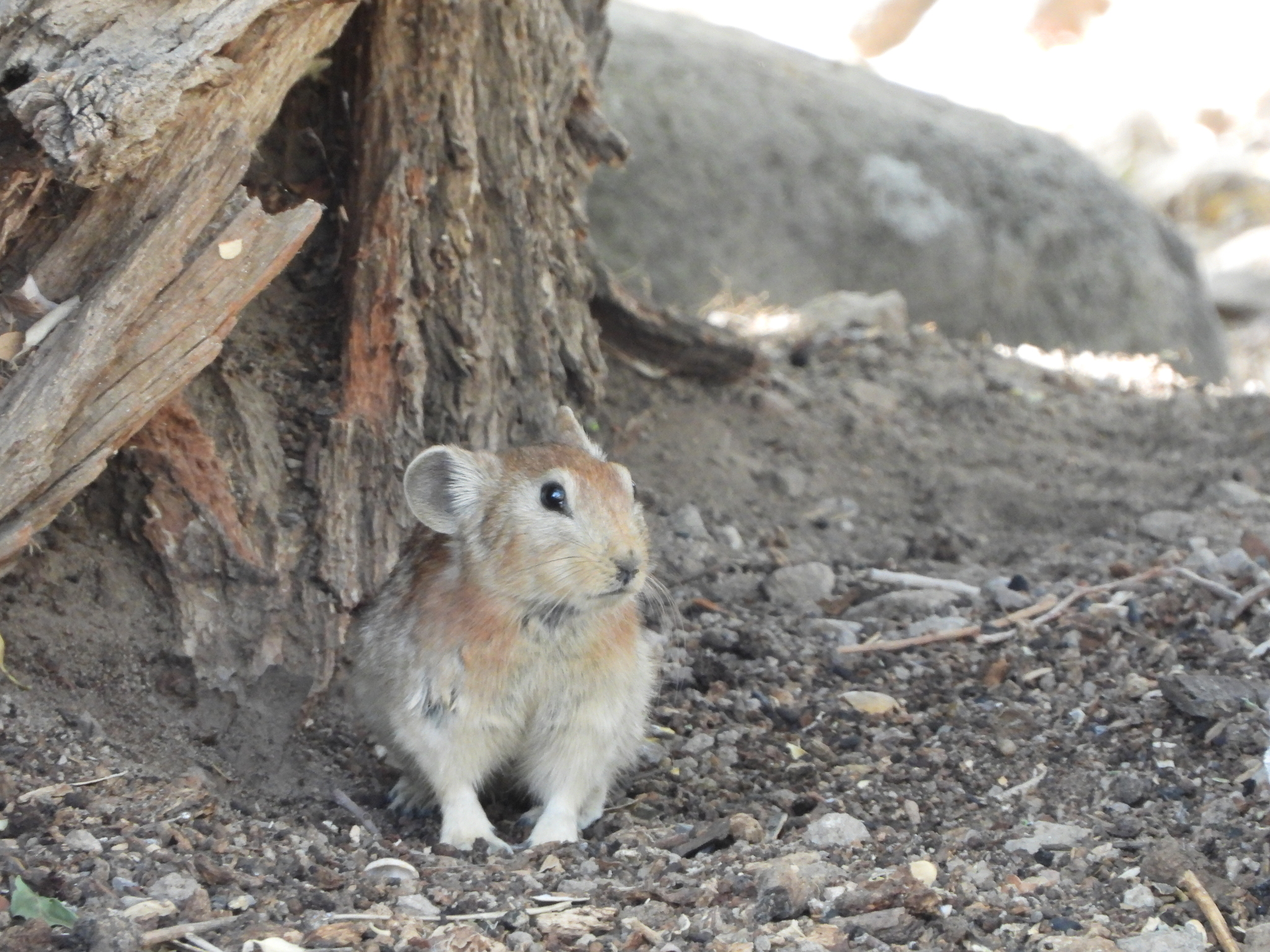

Conservation status
- Least Concern (IUCN 3.1)

Scientific classification
- Kingdom: Animalia
- Phylum: Chordata
- Class: Mammalia
- Order: Lagomorpha
- Family: Ochotonidae
- Genus: Ochotona
- Species: O. rufescens

Binomial name
- Ochotona rufescens (J. E. Gray, 1842)
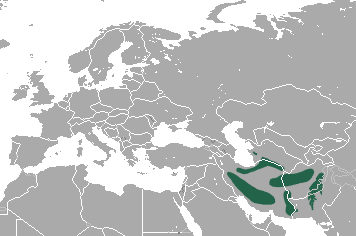
- Afghan pika range

= Afghan pika =

Species of mammal

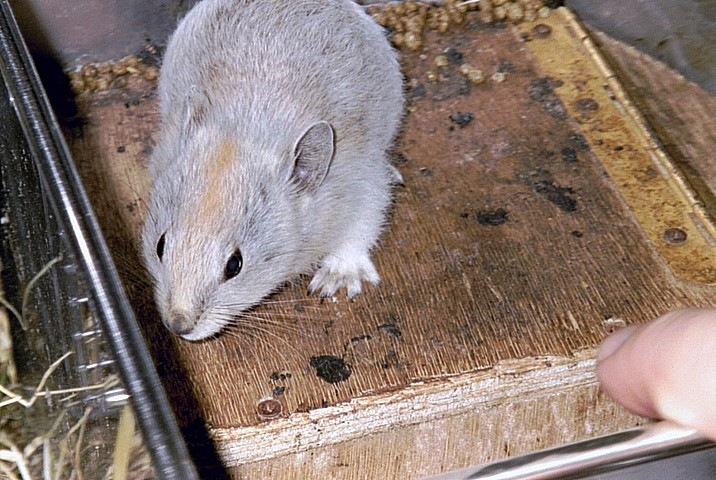
A young Afghan pika

The Afghan pika (Ochotona rufescens) is a species of small mammal in the pika family, Ochotonidae. It is found in Iranian Plateau or Afghanistan, Iran, Pakistan and Turkmenistan and the IUCN lists it as being of "least concern".

== Taxonomy ==
The Afghan pika was first described by John Edward Gray in 1842, the type locality being "India, Cabul, Rocky Hills near Baker Tomb at about 6000 or 8000 feet [ca. 1829 or 2438 m] elevation", (probably referring to Kabul in Afghanistan). Three subspecies are recognised, Ochotona r. rufescens, Ochotona r. regina and Ochotona r. shukurovi.

== Description ==
The Afghan pika is a lagomorph, a small mammal related to rabbits and hares, and has a small head with rounded ears, short, densely furred legs and furred soles to the feet. The fur is reddish-brown with a cream-coloured collar round the neck and paler underparts.

== Distribution and habitat ==
The Afghan pika occurs in mountainous regions of Afghanistan, Iran, Pakistan and southwestern Turkmenistan at altitudes between 1,900 and 3,500 metres (6,200 and 11,500 ft). It is found in rocky desert habitats where vegetation cover is sparse and covers less than 60% of the ground, also in juniper woodland.

== Behaviour ==
The Afghan pika lives in a burrow system. It is diurnal, with peak activity during the morning. It feeds on plant material including Ephedra, Artemisia and thistles. Some stems and leaves are cut into lengths and dried in the open air before being stored in the burrow. The breeding season lasts from March to September during which time a female may have five litters averaging six offspring. Juveniles born early in the season mature fast enough to have young themselves the same year.

== Status ==
The Afghan pika has a wide range and the population appears to be steady. Although it typically lives in rocky semi-desert habitat, it is able to adapt to living at the edge of cultivated land, in orchards and even in field walls and the walls of houses made of adobe. In some regions it is considered a pest as it feeds on crops and damages the bark of fruit trees, and in these areas it may be persecuted. The International Union for Conservation of Nature has listed the animal as being of "least concern" but an isolated population on the Small Balkhan Ridge may be endangered. The animal has been domesticated and used in research, particularly in France and Japan.
