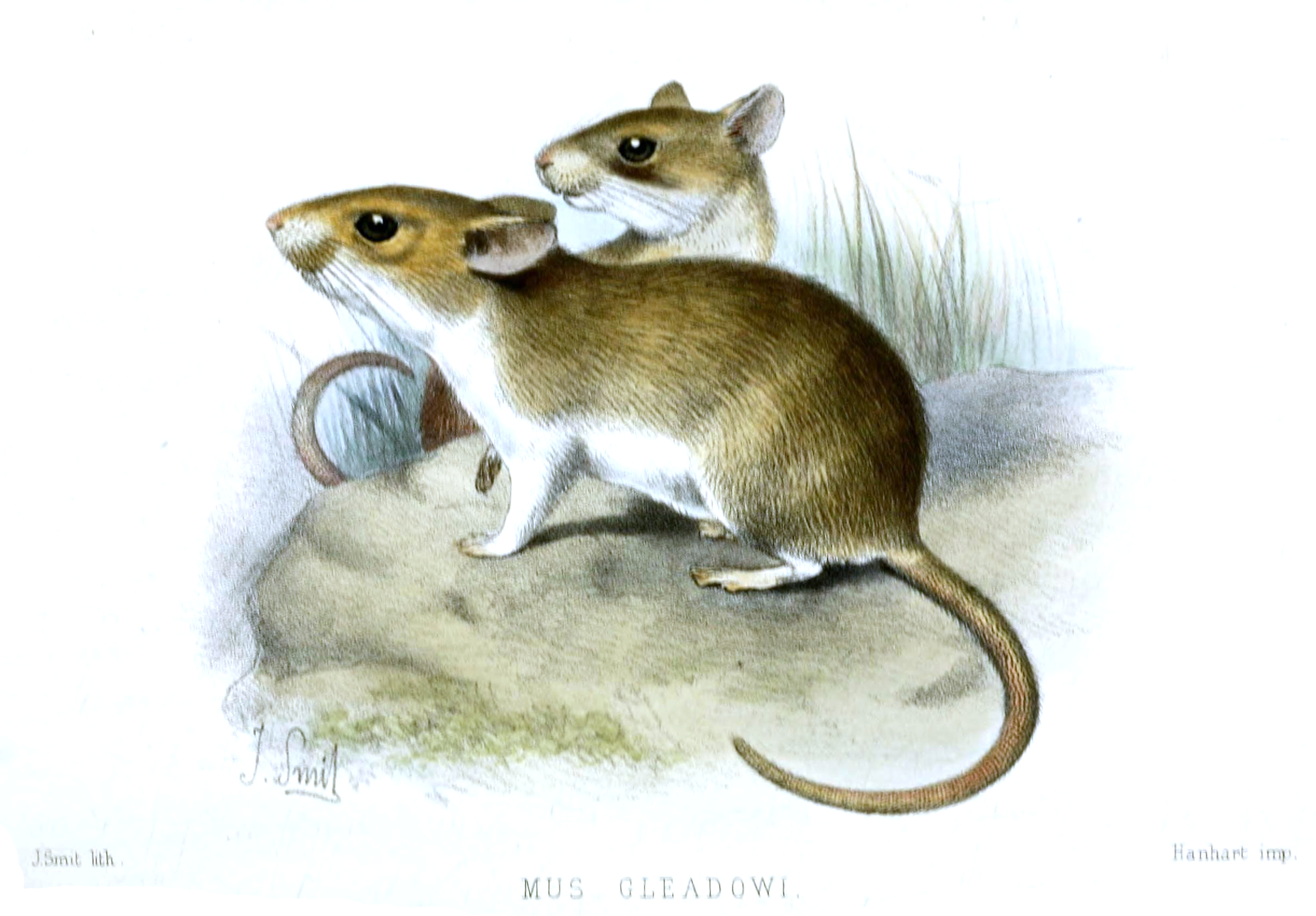

Conservation status
- Least Concern (IUCN 3.1)

Scientific classification
- Kingdom: Animalia
- Phylum: Chordata
- Class: Mammalia
- Order: Rodentia
- Family: Muridae
- Genus: Millardia
- Species: M. gleadowi

Binomial name
- Millardia gleadowi (Murray, 1886)

= Sand-colored soft-furred rat =

Species of rodent

The sand-colored soft-furred rat (Millardia gleadowi) also known as sand colored metad is a species of rodent in the family Muridae. It is found in India and Pakistan.
