= Gmelin's white-toothed shrew =

Conservation status
- Least Concern (IUCN 3.1)

Scientific classification
- Kingdom: Animalia
- Phylum: Chordata
- Class: Mammalia
- Order: Eulipotyphla
- Family: Soricidae
- Genus: Crocidura
- Species: C. gmelini

Binomial name
- Crocidura gmelini Pallas, 1811
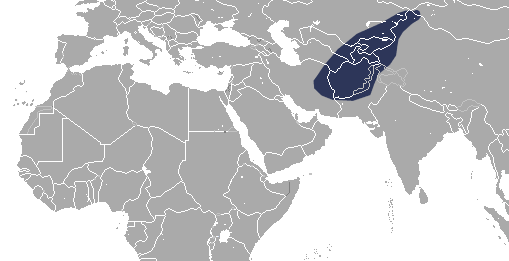
- Gmelin's white-toothed shrew range

Species of mammal

Gmelin's white-toothed shrew (Crocidura gmelini) is a species of mammal in the family Soricidae. It is found in Afghanistan, China, Iran, and Pakistan.
