= Rock-loving mouse =

Conservation status
- Least Concern (IUCN 3.1)

Scientific classification
- Kingdom: Animalia
- Phylum: Chordata
- Class: Mammalia
- Order: Rodentia
- Family: Muridae
- Genus: Mus
- Subgenus: Pyromys
- Species: M. saxicola

Binomial name
- Mus saxicola Elliot, 1839

Synonyms
- Leggada cindrella Wroughton, 1912; Leggada platythrix subsp. sadhu Wroughton, 1911; Leggadilla gurkha Thomas, 1914; Mus platythrix subsp. gurkha (Thomas, 1914); Mus platythrix ssp. ramnadensis (Bentham, 1908); Mus platythrix subsp. sadhu (Wroughton, 1911); Mus ramnadensis Bentham, 1908; Mus spinulosus Blyth, 1854

Species of rodent

The rock-loving mouse (Mus saxicola), also known as the brown spiny mouse, is a species of rodent in the family Muridae. It is found in India, Nepal, and Pakistan.

The following description is by Sir Walter Elliot:

The brown spiny mouse lives entirely in the red gravelly soil in a burrow of moderate depth, generally on the side of a bank. When the animal is inside the entrance is closed with small pebbles, a quantity of which is collected outside, by which its retreat may always be known. The burrow leads to a chamber in which is collected a bed of small pebbles on which it sits, the thick close hair of the belly protecting it from the cold and asperity of such a seat. Its food appears to be vegetable. In its habits it is monogamous and nocturnal.
