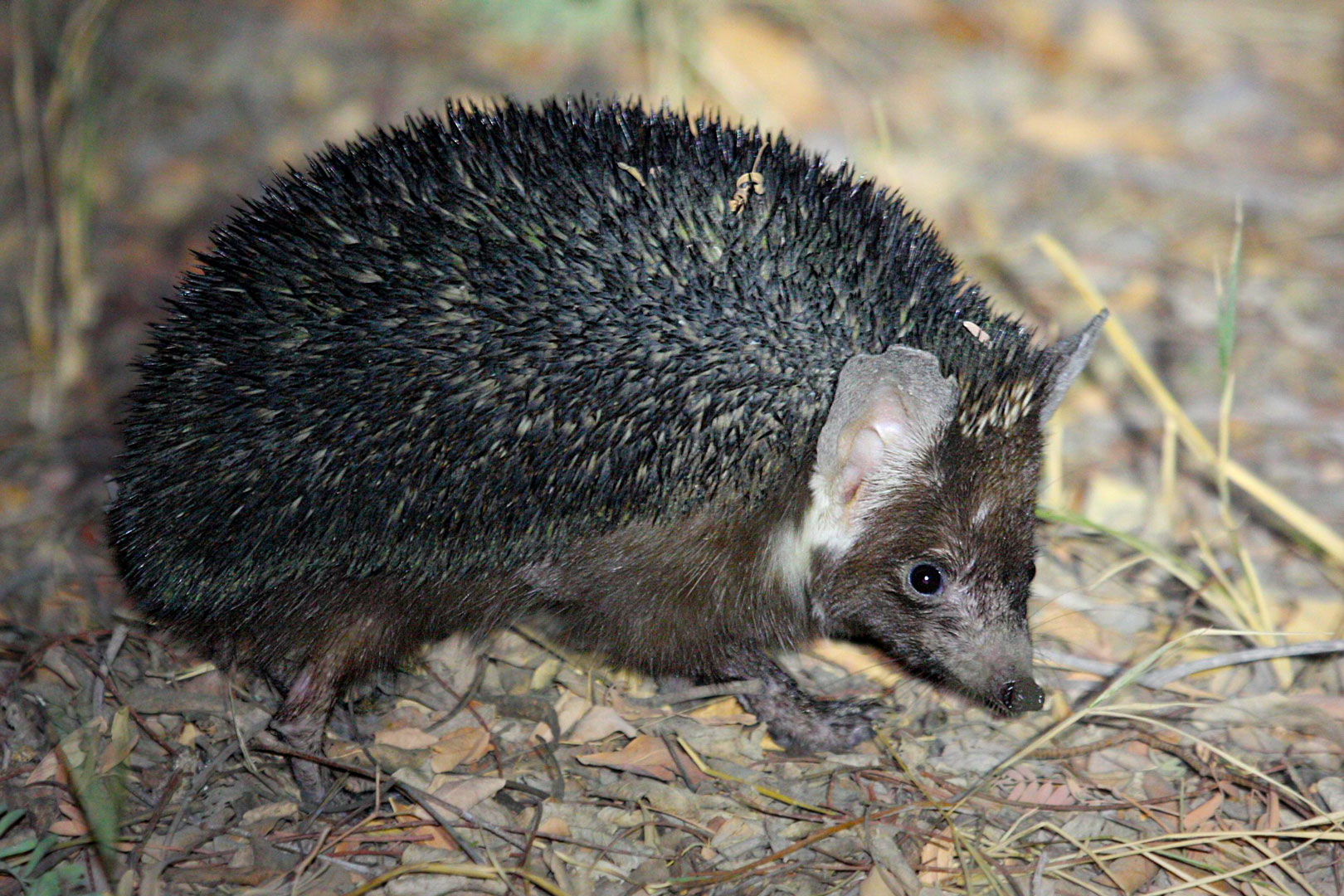

Conservation status
- Least Concern (IUCN 3.1)

Scientific classification
- Kingdom: Animalia
- Phylum: Chordata
- Class: Mammalia
- Order: Eulipotyphla
- Family: Erinaceidae
- Genus: Paraechinus
- Species: P. hypomelas

Binomial name
- Paraechinus hypomelas (Brandt, 1836)
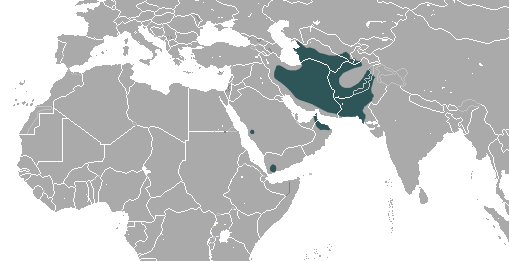
- Brandt's hedgehog range

= Brandt's hedgehog =

Species of mammal

Brandt's hedgehog (Paraechinus hypomelas) is a species of desert hedgehog native to parts of the Middle East and Central Asia. Its common name derives from Johann Friedrich von Brandt, a director of the Zoological Department at the St Petersburg Academy of Sciences, who first described the species.

== Description ==
Brandt's hedgehog is about 500–1,000 g (18–35 oz) in weight and 25 cm (9.8 in) in length), approximately the size of the West European hedgehog. It has distinctively large ears (similar to the long-eared hedgehog), and is a much faster runner, due to lighter needle protection. Unlike the long-eared hedgehog, it is predominantly nocturnal. Brandt's Hedgehogs exhibit either dark brown or tan coloration.

Iranian populations of Brandt's Hedgehog were found to have high genetic diversity and showed evidence of population expansion.

== Habitat ==
Brandt's hedgehogs prefers arid desert areas and mountains. The species occupies parts of Afganistan, Kazakhstan, Iran, Iraq, Pakistan, Tajikistan, Turkmenistan, and Uzbekistan. They can also be found on a few isolated islands in the Persian Gulf.

== Research ==
The first and only study of the Brandt's hedgehog histological skin characteristics found three layers of skin the epidermis, dermis and hypodermis; while previous studies of other hedgehogs cited only two.

A study on the effects of isolation on Brandt's hedgehog populations found significant differences in size between mainland and island populations. Researchers proposed a new subspecies classification due to distinct differences in traits.
