= List of erinaceids =

Species in mammal family Erinaceidae

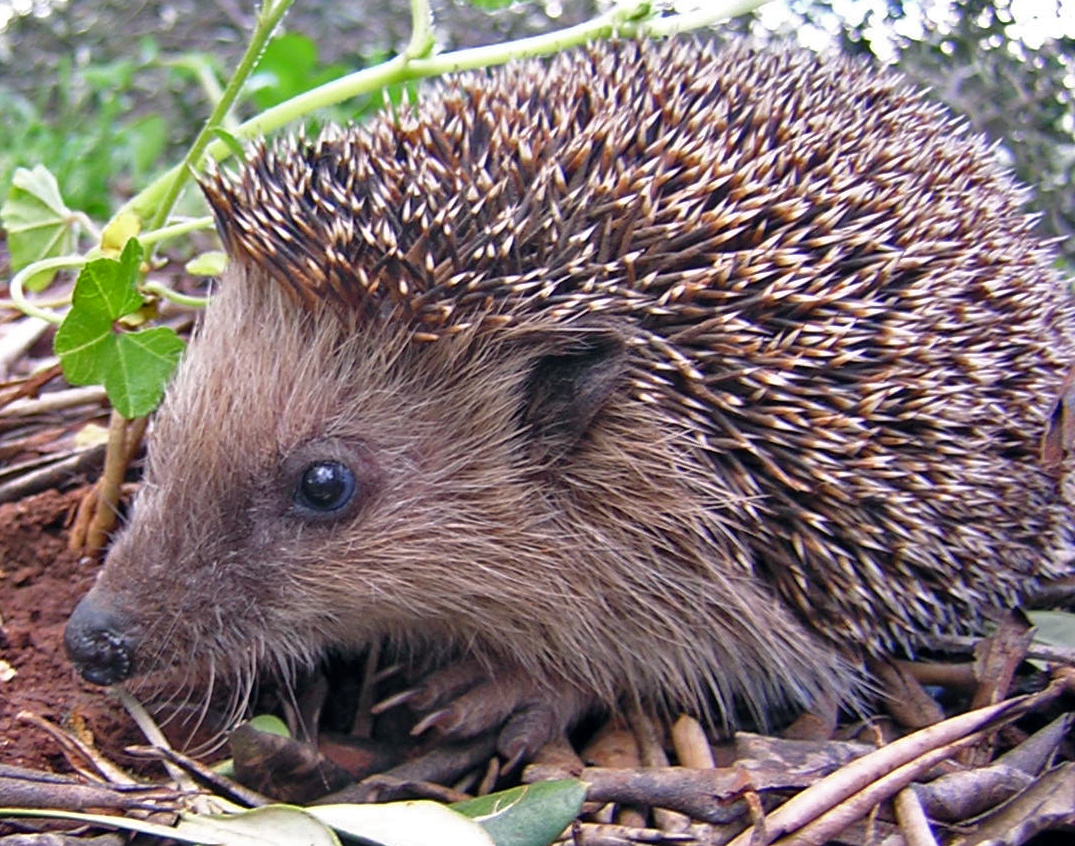
European hedgehog (Erinaceus europaeus)

Erinaceidae is a family of small mammals in the order Eulipotyphla. A member of this family is called an erinaceid, and the family includes hedgehogs and gymnures. Erinaceidae is one of four families in the order Eulipotyphla. They are found in Africa, Europe, and Asia, primarily in forests, shrublands, savannas, and grasslands, though some species can also be found in deserts, rocky areas, or caves. They range in size from the gymnures in the Hylomys genus, at 9 cm (4 in) plus a 1 cm (0.4 in) tail, to the moonrat, at 46 cm (18 in) plus a 30 cm (12 in) tail. Erinaceids are omnivorous and primarily eat insects and small vertebrates such as lizards, though they also consume plants, eggs, and fungi. Hedgehogs all have spines on their backs, while gymnures have fur. No erinaceids have population estimates, but the Dinagat gymnure is categorized as an endangered species.

The twenty-four extant species of Erinaceidae are divided into two subfamilies: Erinaceinae, containing sixteen hedgehog species in five genera, and Galericinae, containing eight gymnure species in five genera. A few extinct prehistoric Erinaceidae species have been discovered, though due to ongoing research and discoveries the exact number and categorization is not fixed.

== Conventions ==
IUCN Red List categories
Conservation status
- EX: Extinct (0 species)
- EW: Extinct in the wild (0 species)
- CR: Critically endangered (0 species)
- EN: Endangered (1 species)
- VU: Vulnerable (2 species)
- NT: Near threatened (1 species)
- LC: Least concern (19 species)

Other categories
- DD: Data deficient (1 species)
- NE: Not evaluated (0 species)

The author citation for the species or genus is given after the scientific name; parentheses around the author citation indicate that this was not the original taxonomic placement. Conservation status codes listed follow the International Union for Conservation of Nature (IUCN) Red List of Threatened Species. Range maps are provided wherever possible; if a range map is not available, a description of the erinaceid's range is provided. Ranges are based on the IUCN Red List for that species unless otherwise noted.

== Classification ==
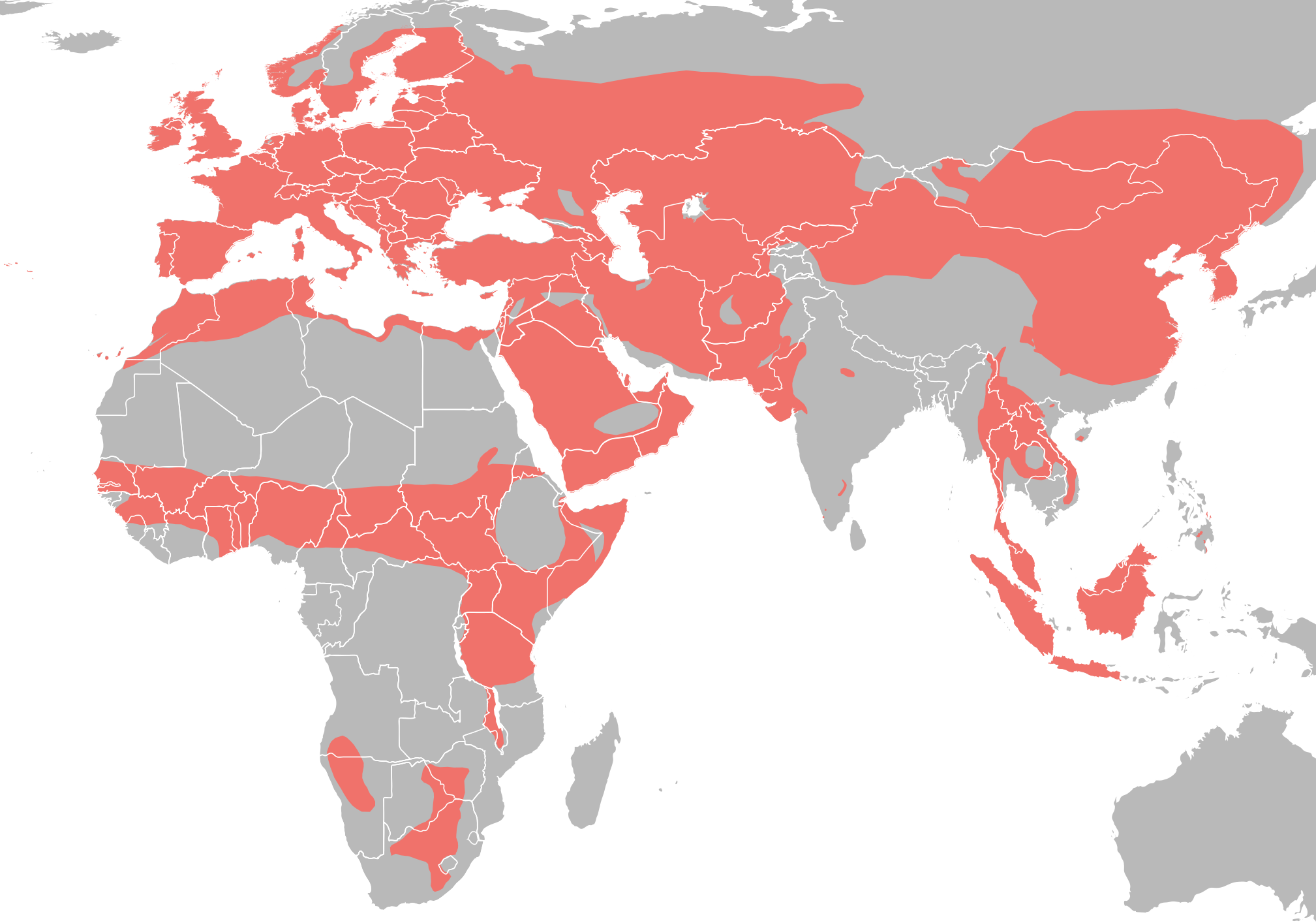
Erinaceidae distribution

The family Erinaceidae consists of twenty-four extant species in two subfamilies: Erinaceinae, containing sixteen hedgehog species in five genera, and Galericinae, containing eight gymnure species in five genera.

Family Erinaceidae

- Subfamily Erinaceinae
  - Genus Atelerix (African hedgehogs): four species
  - Genus Erinaceus (woodland hedgehogs): four species
  - Genus Hemiechinus (long-eared hedgehogs): two species
  - Genus Mesechinus (steppe hedgehogs): two species
  - Genus Paraechinus (desert hedgehogs): four species
- Subfamily Galericinae
  - Genus Echinosorex (moonrat): one species
  - Genus Hylomys (gymnures): three species
  - Genus Neohylomys (Hainan gymnure): one species
  - Genus Neotetracus (shrew gymnure): one species
  - Genus Podogymnura (Philippine gymnures): two species

- Erinaceidae
  - Erinaceinae
    - - Mesechinus
      - - Hemiechinus
        - Paraechinus
    - - Atelerix
      - Erinaceus
  - Galericinae
    - - Echinosorex
      - Podogymnura
    - - Hylomys
      - - Neohylomys
        - Neotetracus

== Erinaceids ==
The following classification is based on the taxonomy described by the reference work Mammal Species of the World (2005), with augmentation by generally accepted proposals made since using molecular phylogenetic analysis, as supported by both the IUCN and the American Society of Mammalogists. The range shown is only for wild populations; domesticated hedgehogs, which are usually four-toed hedgehogs, North African hedgehogs, or hybrids of the two, may live outside these areas.

=== Subfamily Erinaceinae ===
Genus Atelerix – Pomel, 1848 – four species
Common name	Scientific name and subspecies	Range	Size and ecology	IUCN status and estimated population
Four-toed hedgehog	A. albiventris (Wagner, 1841)	Western, central, and eastern Africa	Size: 17–23 cm (7–9 in) long Habitat: Savanna and grassland Diet: Invertebrates, as well as plants and small vertebrates	LC Unknown
North African hedgehog	A. algirus (Lereboullet, 1842) Three subspecies: A. a. algirus; A. a. girbanensis; A. a. vagans	Northern Africa	Size: 20–25 cm (8–10 in) long Habitat: Forest, shrubland, and grassland Diet: Omnivorous, including arthropods, small vertebrates, carrion, and fungi	LC Unknown
Somali hedgehog	A. sclateri Anderson, 1895	Somalia	Size: 20–27 cm (8–11 in) long, plus 1–2 cm (0.4–0.8 in) tail Habitat: Grassland and savanna Diet: Believed to be omnivorous; primarily insects	LC Unknown
Southern African hedgehog	A. frontalis (Smith, 1831)	Southern Africa	Size: 15–20 cm (6–8 in) long, plus 2 cm (1 in) tail Habitat: Savanna, shrubland, and grassland Diet: Omnivorous; primarily insects, as well as carrion, vegetables, fungi, and small vertebrates	LC Unknown

Genus Erinaceus – Linnaeus, 1758 – four species
Common name	Scientific name and subspecies	Range	Size and ecology	IUCN status and estimated population
Amur hedgehog	E. amurensis Schrenk, 1859	Eastern Asia	Size: 15–29 cm (6–11 in) long, plus 1–5 cm (0.4–2.0 in) tail Habitat: Forest and shrubland Diet: Earthworms and other ground invertebrates, as well as small vertebrates and fruit	LC Unknown
European hedgehog	E. europaeus Linnaeus, 1758	Europe and northwestern Asia, and introduced in New Zealand	Size: 13–27 cm (5–11 in) long, plus 2 cm (1 in) tail Habitat: Forest and grassland Diet: Omnivorous; primarily insects, as well as other invertebrates, eggs, small vertebrates, and carrion	NT Unknown
Northern white-breasted hedgehog	E. roumanicus Barrett-Hamilton, 1900	Eastern Europe and western Asia (in blue)	Size: 13–30 cm (5–12 in) long, plus 1–5 cm (0.4–2.0 in) tail Habitat: Forest and shrubland Diet: Omnivorous; primarily insects, as well as other invertebrates, eggs, small vertebrates, and carrion	LC Unknown
Southern white-breasted hedgehog	E. concolor Martin, 1838	Western Asia (in orange)	Size: 13–30 cm (5–12 in) long, plus 1–5 cm (0.4–2.0 in) tail Habitat: Forest and shrubland Diet: Omnivorous; primarily insects, as well as other invertebrates, eggs, small vertebrates, and carrion	LC Unknown

Genus Hemiechinus – Fitzinger, 1866 – two species
Common name	Scientific name and subspecies	Range	Size and ecology	IUCN status and estimated population
Indian long-eared hedgehog	H. collaris (Gray, 1830)	Western India and Pakistan	Size: 15–28 cm (6–11 in) long, plus 1–6 cm (0.4–2.4 in) tail Habitat: Shrubland, grassland, and desert Diet: Omnivorous; primarily invertebrates and insects, as well as small vertebrates, eggs, carrion, fruit, and seeds	LC Unknown
Long-eared hedgehog	H. auritus (Gmelin, 1770)	Western and central Asia	Size: 12–27 cm (5–11 in) long, plus 1–5 cm (0.4–2.0 in) tail Habitat: Shrubland and desert Diet: Omnivorous; primarily invertebrates and insects, as well as eggs, fruit, vegetables, and small vertebrates	LC Unknown

Genus Mesechinus – Ognew, 1951 – two species
Common name	Scientific name and subspecies	Range	Size and ecology	IUCN status and estimated population
Daurian hedgehog	M. dauuricus (Sundevall, 1842)	East-central Asia	Size: About 24 cm (9 in) long, plus 3 cm (1 in) tail Habitat: Forest and grassland Diet: Beetles and other invertebrates, as well as small reptiles, bird eggs and nestlings, rodents, and carrion	LC Unknown
Hugh's hedgehog	M. hughi (Thomas, 1908)	Central China	Size: About 24 cm (9 in) long, plus 3 cm (1 in) tail Habitat: Grassland Diet: Omnivorous; primarily invertebrates and insects, as well as small vertebrates, eggs, carrion, fruit, and seeds	LC Unknown

Genus Paraechinus – Trouessart, 1879 – four species
Common name	Scientific name and subspecies	Range	Size and ecology	IUCN status and estimated population
Bare-bellied hedgehog	P. nudiventris (Horsfield, 1851)	Southern India	Size: 14–28 cm (6–11 in) long, plus 1–4 cm (0.4–1.6 in) tail Habitat: Forest and shrubland Diet: Insects, as well as small vertebrates, eggs, and scorpions	LC Unknown
Brandt's hedgehog	P. hypomelas (Brandt, 1836)	Western Asia	Size: 14–28 cm (6–11 in) long, plus 1–4 cm (0.4–1.6 in) tail Habitat: Savanna, shrubland, grassland, and desert Diet: Insects, as well as small vertebrates, eggs, and scorpions	LC Unknown
Desert hedgehog	P. aethiopicus (Ehrenberg, 1832)	Northern Africa and Arabian Peninsula	Size: 14–23 cm (6–9 in) long Habitat: Desert, inland wetlands, grassland, shrubland, and savanna Diet: Insects, as well as other invertebrates, amphibians, reptiles, and eggs	LC Unknown
Indian hedgehog	P. micropus (Blyth, 1846)	Western India and Pakistan	Size: 14–28 cm (6–11 in) long, plus 1–4 cm (0.4–1.6 in) tail Habitat: Shrubland and desert Diet: Insects, as well as other invertebrates, small vertebrates, and eggs	LC Unknown

=== Subfamily Galericinae ===
Genus Echinosorex – Blainville, 1836 – one species
Common name	Scientific name and subspecies	Range	Size and ecology	IUCN status and estimated population
Moonrat	E. gymnura (Raffles, 1822) Two subspecies: E. g. alba; E. g. gymnura	Southeast Asia	Size: 26–46 cm (10–18 in) long, plus 16–30 cm (6–12 in) tail Habitat: Forest Diet: Invertebrates, as well as frogs, fish, and fruit	LC Unknown

Genus Hylomys – Müller, 1839 – three species
Common name	Scientific name and subspecies	Range	Size and ecology	IUCN status and estimated population
Dwarf gymnure	H. parvus Robinson & Kloss, 1916	Sumatra island in Indonesia	Size: 9–15 cm (4–6 in) long, plus 1–3 cm (0.4–1.2 in) tail Habitat: Forest Diet: Invertebrates, as well as fruit	VU Unknown
Long-eared gymnure	H. megalotis Jenkins & Robinson, 2002	Laos	Size: 9–15 cm (4–6 in) long, plus 1–3 cm (0.4–1.2 in) tail Habitat: Forest, shrubland, and rocky areas Diet: Invertebrates, as well as fruit	DD Unknown
Short-tailed gymnure	H. suillus Müller, 1840 Seven subspecies: H. s. dorsalis (Bornean short-tailed gymnure); H. s. maxi (Max's short-tailed gymnure); H. s. microtinus; H. s. pegunensis (Northern short-tailed gymnure); H. s. siamensis; H. s. suillus (Javan short-tailed gymnure); H. s. tionis	Southeastern Asia	Size: 9–15 cm (4–6 in) long, plus 1–3 cm (0.4–1.2 in) tail Habitat: Forest and shrubland Diet: Invertebrates, as well as fruit	LC Unknown

Genus Neohylomys – Shaw & Wong, 1959 – one species
Common name	Scientific name and subspecies	Range	Size and ecology	IUCN status and estimated population
Hainan gymnure	N. hainanensis Shaw & Wong, 1959	Hainan island, China	Size: 12–15 cm (5–6 in) long, plus 3–5 cm (1–2 in) tail Habitat: Forest and caves Diet: Insects, worms, and plants	VU Unknown

Genus Neotetracus – Trouessart, 1909 – one species
Common name	Scientific name and subspecies	Range	Size and ecology	IUCN status and estimated population
Shrew gymnure	N. sinensis Trouessart, 1909	Southern China	Size: 10–13 cm (4–5 in) long, plus 4–7 cm (2–3 in) tail Habitat: Forest Diet: Insects, worms, and plants	LC Unknown

Genus Podogymnura – Mearns, 1905 – two species
Common name	Scientific name and subspecies	Range	Size and ecology	IUCN status and estimated population
Dinagat gymnure	P. aureospinula Heaney & Morgan, 1982	Philippines	Size: 19–22 cm (7–9 in) long, plus 5–8 cm (2–3 in) tail Habitat: Forest Diet: Insects, worms, and birds	EN Unknown
Mindanao gymnure	P. truei Mearns, 1905	Philippines	Size: 13–15 cm (5–6 in) long, plus 4–7 cm (2–3 in) tail Habitat: Forest Diet: Insects, worms, and carrion	LC Unknown

== Sources ==
- Kingdon, Jonathan (2014). Mammals of Africa. Vol. IV: Hedgehogs, Shrews and Bats. A & C Black. ISBN 978-1-4081-8993-1.
- Nowak, Ronald M. (1999). Walker's Mammals of the World. Vol. 1. Johns Hopkins University Press. ISBN 978-0-8018-5789-8.
- Smith, Andrew T.; Xie, Yan, eds. (2010). A Guide to the Mammals of China. Princeton University Press. ISBN 978-1-4008-3411-2.
- Hutterer, Rainer (2005). Wilson, Don E.; Reeder, DeeAnn M. (eds.). Mammal Species of the World. Vol. 1 (3rd ed.). Johns Hopkins University Press. ISBN 978-0-8018-8221-0.
