= Short-tailed gymnure =

Short-tailed gymnure can refer to any of these species:

- Javan short-tailed gymnure (Hylomys suillus)
- Bornean short-tailed gymnure (Hylomys dorsalis, formerly a subspecies of H. suillus)
- Max's short-tailed gymnure (Hylomys maxi, formerly a subspecies of H. suillus)
- Northern short-tailed gymnure (Hylomys peguensis, formerly a subspecies of H. suillus)
