= Leuser gymnure =

Scientific classification
- Kingdom: Animalia
- Phylum: Chordata
- Class: Mammalia
- Order: Eulipotyphla
- Family: Erinaceidae
- Genus: Hylomys
- Species: H. vorax

Binomial name
- Hylomys vorax Hinckley, Lunde, & Hawkins, 2023

Species of mammal

The Leuser gymnure (Hylomys vorax) is a gymnure from the island of Sumatra in Indonesia that was described formally for the first time in 2023. The holotype was collected in 1939 by Frederick A. Ulmer in the upper parts of Gunung Leuser, Sumatra. It is only known from 2,073 to 2,835 m (6,801 to 9,301 ft) above sea level on Gunung Leuser. Its specific name derives from its voracious behavior described by F. Ulmer. Mitochondrial DNA analysis differentiates this species from Hylomys parvus, inhabiting similar mountain forests in Gunung Kerinci, on the same island of Sumatra, and from Hylomys maxi, a congeneric species inhabiting lower areas.

== See also ==
- List of living mammal species described in the 2020s
