= Dalat gymnure =

Scientific classification
- Kingdom: Animalia
- Phylum: Chordata
- Class: Mammalia
- Order: Eulipotyphla
- Family: Erinaceidae
- Genus: Hylomys
- Species: H. macarong

Binomial name
- Hylomys macarong Hinckley, Lunde, & Hawkins, 2023

Species of mammal

The Dalat gymnure (Hylomys macarong) is a gymnure that was described formally for the first time in 2023. It is known from Dalat, Vietnam. The specific name macarong derived from the Vietnamese word for vampire, Ma cà rồng, as a tribute to the prominent long fangs, specifically the first upper incisors, that distinguish mature males of this species.

== Discovery and taxonomy ==
The Dalat gymnure was described as a member of the genus Hylomys, part of the subfamily Galericinae that includes the gymnures and moonrats, in a 2023 study led by National Museum of Natural History researcher Arlo Hinckley. The new species was identified through analysis of DNA and physical characteristics. The study placed H. macarong as closely related to the northern short-tailed gymnure (Hylomys peguensis). The specific name, macarong, was derived from the Vietnamese word for vampire, Ma cà rồng. It was noted that several specimens belonging to the species had been in museum collections since 1961.

== Description ==
The Dalat gymnure is a medium-sized gymnure, having average head and body length of 138.4 millimetres (5.45 in). Males have rusty-coloured chest fur, and all individuals lack the white colour around the rim of the ear present in the northern short-tailed gymnure. It has dark brown fur on most of its body and long, pointed incisors that have as of yet unclear purpose, though it is speculated that they play a part in sexual selection, as the incisors of males are generally larger.

== See also ==
- List of living mammal species described in the 2020s
