= Galerix stehlini =

Galerix stehlini Temporal range: Middle Miocene

Scientific classification
- Kingdom: Animalia
- Phylum: Chordata
- Class: Mammalia
- Infraclass: Placentalia
- Order: Eulipotyphla
- Family: Erinaceidae
- Genus: †Galerix
- Species: †G. stehlini

Binomial name
- †Galerix stehlini Gaillard, 1929

Extinct species of Galerix

Galerix stehlini is an extinct species of gymnure in the genus Galerix that lived in Europe during the Middle Miocene subepoch.

== Palaeobiology ==
=== Palaeopathology ===
G. stehlini fossils have been unearthed at La Grive-Saint-Alban in France displaying evidence of supernumerary alveolar sockets and root subdivision, likely reflecting inbreeding depression caused by habitat fragmentation. One fossil of G. stehlini found at the site exhibits signs of bite trauma likely produced by Parasorex socialis.
