= Tetracus =

Tetracus Temporal range: 28.4–23.03 Ma

Scientific classification
- Kingdom: Animalia
- Phylum: Chordata
- Class: Mammalia
- Order: Eulipotyphla
- Family: Erinaceidae
- Subfamily: Galericinae
- Genus: †Tetracus; Aymard 1850

Type species
- †Tetracus nanus Aymard, 1846

Extinct genus of mammals

Tetracus is an extinct genus of gymnures. Species are from the Oligocene of Belgium and France. Fossils can also be found in the Bouldnor Formation in the Hampshire Basin of southern England.

Species:

- †Tetracus nanus (Aymard, 1846)
  - synonym Erinaceus nanus Aymard, 1846
  - synonym Camphotherium elegans Filhol, 1883, Filhol, 1884
  - synonym Comphotherium elegans Filhol, 1884, Filhol 1885
  - synonym Gomphotherium elegans Filhol, 1884 in Schlosser, 1887, p. 140 and 465 and in Lavocat, 1951, p. 14
  - synonym Neurogymnurus minor Filhol, 1884
  - synonym Necrogymnurus minor in Lavocat, 1951, p. 13
  - synonym Tetracus bouti Lavocat, 1951, dans Lavocat, 1951.
