= Dzavui (mammal) =

Dzavui Temporal range: 41.3–28.1 Ma Bartonian to the top of the Rupelian

Scientific classification
- Domain: Eukaryota
- Kingdom: Animalia
- Phylum: Chordata
- Class: Mammalia
- Order: Eulipotyphla
- Family: Erinaceidae
- Subfamily: Galericinae
- Genus: †Dzavui; Jiménez-Hidalgoa et al., 2022

Type species
- Dzavui landeri

Extinct genus of mammals

Dzavui is a genus of galericine erinaceid that lived in Mexico during the Oligocene epoch.
