= Neohylomys vietnamensis =

Conservation status
- Near Threatened (IUCN 3.1)

Scientific classification
- Kingdom: Animalia
- Phylum: Chordata
- Class: Mammalia
- Order: Eulipotyphla
- Family: Erinaceidae
- Genus: Neohylomys
- Species: N. vietnamensis

Binomial name
- Neohylomys vietnamensis A.A. Bannikova, Lebedev, Gorchkhanov, Fei, Dinh, Bui, Kruskop, Rozhnov & Abramov, 2024

Species of mammal

Neohylomys vietnamensis, the Vietnamese gymnure, is a species of gymnure endemic to Vietnam.
