= Silvacola =

Silvacola Temporal range: Ypresian ~50 Ma

Scientific classification
- Kingdom: Animalia
- Phylum: Chordata
- Class: Mammalia
- Order: Eulipotyphla
- Family: Erinaceidae
- Genus: †Silvacola; Eberle, Rybczynski & Greenwood, 2014
- Species: †S. acares

Binomial name
- †Silvacola acares Eberle, Rybczynski & Greenwood, 2014

Extinct genus of mammals

Silvacola is an extinct genus of mammals belonging to the family Erinaceidae, which also contains the modern hedgehogs and gymnures. It lived in North America during the Early Eocene, about 50 million years ago. It was just 5 to 6 centimetres (2.0 to 2.4 in) long, roughly the length of an adult thumb. It is the smallest erinaceid ever found and comparable in size to some of today's shrews.

The teeth suggest it was an omnivore that probably ate insects and plants it found on the forest floor.

The fossil was discovered in the Driftwood Creek Beds near Smithers, British Columbia, about 670 kilometers north of Vancouver. It was once the site of an ancient lake, and it is a popular place to find fossils of early Eocene flora and fauna., part of the Eocene Okanagan Highlands.
