= Galerix kostakii =

Galerix kostakii Temporal range: Early Miocene (MN 4)

Scientific classification
- Domain: Eukaryota
- Kingdom: Animalia
- Phylum: Chordata
- Class: Mammalia
- Order: Eulipotyphla
- Family: Erinaceidae
- Genus: †Galerix
- Species: †G. kostakii

Binomial name
- †Galerix kostakii Doukas and Van den Hoek Ostende, 2006

Extinct species of mammal

Galerix kostakii is a fossil erinaceid mammal from the early Miocene of Greece. It is known from the site of Karydia, assigned to the biostratigraphical zone MN 4; similar fossils have been found at an approximately contemporary Czech site and a slightly younger Greek site. With characters like the presence of a hypocone (fourth cusp) on the upper third premolar, the presence of a connection between the protocone and metaconule cusps on the second upper molar in only a few specimens, this species is intermediate between the slightly older Galerix symeonidisi and the slightly younger Parasorex pristinus. It may form part of the lineage leading from the genus Galerix to the younger genus Parasorex.

== Taxonomy and range ==
Galerix kostakii was first described in 2006 by Greek and Dutch paleontologists Constantin Doukas and Lars van den Hoek Ostende from the Greek paleontological site of Karydia. The specific name, kostakii, honors Constantin "Kostaki" Theocharopoulos, who studied the cricetid rodents found at Karydia. Karydia is dated to the mammal zone MN 4 (late early Miocene). Galerix kostakii dominates the insectivore fauna of Karydia, forming 60% of the total fauna. In contrast, at Aliveri, a slightly older Greek site also assigned to MN 4, Galerix (represented by the related species Galerix symeonidisi) forms only about 25% of the insectivore fauna. The reason for this difference is unknown. In Komotini, a slightly younger site (assigned to zone MN 5) near Karydia, a single first upper molar (M1) of an unidentified Galerix species similar to G. kostakii has been found. In the Czech region of Mokrá, at a site known as "Mokrá – 1/2001 Turtle Joint" (MN 4), a few fossils of a Galerix very similar to G. kostakii have been found.

== Description and relationships ==
Unlike most species of the genus Galerix, G. kostakii has a fourth cusp, the hypocone, on its upper third premolar (P3). Galerix symeonidisi and Galerix iliensis also have this cusp, but are smaller and larger, respectively, than G. kostakii. In addition, G. kostakii differs from G. symeonidisi in that a connection between the protocone and metaconule cusps of M2 is more rarely present and the back arm of the metaconule always reaches the back corner of the tooth. Members of the related genus Parasorex are similar, but never have a protocone-metaconule connection, which is still occasionally present in G. kostakii. The primitive Parasorex species Parasorex pristinus is about as large as G. kostakii, but its molars are narrower, the first lower premolar (p4) is smaller, and the metacone cusp on M2 has a straight anterior arm. Furthermore, Galerix kostakii lacks the paralophid on p4, a crest that connects the paraconid and protoconid cusps.

Galerix kostakii shares some of the features present in Parasorex and Schizogalerix, both derived descendants of Galerix, including the presence of a hypocone on P3, a partitioned posterior cingulum on m1 and m2, and the absence of the protocone-metaconule connection in most M1 and M2. However, it also retains primitive, Galerix-like features, including the condition of p4 and the presence of a protocone-metaconule connection in some specimens. Galerix kostakii may be part of a lineage that led from the slightly more primitive G. symeonidisi through G. kostakii to Parasorex pristinus, the oldest species of its genus, and then to the other Parasorex species. This lineage may have evolved these traits, which may be adaptations to a herbivorous diet, convergently with Schizogalerix, which appears earlier in the fossil record.

== Literature cited ==
- Doukas, C.S.; Van den Hoek Ostende, L.W. (2006). "Insectivores (Erinaceomorpha, Soricomorpha; Mammalia) from Karydia and Komotini (Thrace, Greece; MN 4/5)". Beiträge zur Paläontologie. 30: 109–131.
- Sabol, M.; Fejfar, O.; Horáček, I.; Čermák, S. (2007). "The Early Miocene micromammalian assemblage from Mokrá - 1/2001 Turtle Joint site (Moravia, Czech Republic) – preliminary results". Scripta Facultatis Scientiarum Naturalium Universitatis Masarykianae Brunensis, Geology. 36: 57–64.
