= Crocidura cranbrooki =

Scientific classification
- Kingdom: Animalia
- Phylum: Chordata
- Class: Mammalia
- Order: Eulipotyphla
- Family: Soricidae
- Genus: Crocidura
- Species: C. cranbrooki

Binomial name
- Crocidura cranbrooki Jenkins, Lunde & Moncrieff, 2009

Species of mammal

Crocidura cranbrooki is a species of shrew from Northern Myanmar.
