= Darrin P. Lunde =

Darrin Peter Lunde
- Born: 7 June 1969 (age 57)
- Education: Cornell University; City College of New York
- Known for: Research on small mammals; science writing
- Scientific career
- Fields: Mammalogy, zoology
- Workplaces: National Museum of Natural History

Darrin Peter Lunde (born 7 June 1969) is an American mammalogist, non-fiction author, and museum specialist. His research focuses primarily on small mammals.

== Biography ==
Lunde received a Bachelor of Science degree from Cornell University in 1991. In 2002, he earned a Master of Arts degree in ecology, evolutionary biology, and biological systematics from the City College of New York.

Lunde worked as a collection manager at the American Museum of Natural History and serves as a senior museum specialist at the National Museum of Natural History, part of the Smithsonian Institution. His responsibilities include overseeing collection-management activities in the Division of Mammals, including acquisitions, specimen preparation, cataloguing, exhibit installation, curation, loans, information requests, and visitor assistance.

Lunde has participated in the scientific descriptions of numerous mammal species, including Chodsigoa caovansunga, Coccymys kirrhos, Leptomys arfakensis, Leptomys paulus, Tonkinomys daovantieni, Saxatilomys paulinae, Neacomys dubosti, Neacomys paracou, Crocidura annamitensis, Crocidura cranbrooki, Crocidura guy, Hylomys macarong, and Hylomys vorax. He has also contributed to the descriptions of the genera Brassomys, Niumbaha, and Hyladelphis.

Lunde has published eleven books, ten of which are aimed at young readers. In 2016, he published his first non-fiction book for adults, The Naturalist: Theodore Roosevelt; A Lifetime of Exploration, and the Triumph of American Natural History. In 2008, he contributed to A Guide to the Mammals of China, edited by Andrew T. Smith. He has also published articles in scientific journals, including American Museum Novitates, the Bulletin of the American Museum of Natural History, and Mammal Study.

== Selected publications ==
- Hello, Bumblebee Bat. Charlesbridge, Watertown, Massachusetts, 2007.
- Meet the Meerkat. Charlesbridge, Watertown, Massachusetts, 2007.
- Discovering a New Animal with a Scientist. Enslow Elementary, Berkeley Heights, New Jersey, 2008.
- After the Kill. Charlesbridge, Watertown, Massachusetts, 2011.
- Hello, Baby Beluga. Charlesbridge, Watertown, Massachusetts, 2011.
- Monkey Colors. Charlesbridge, Watertown, Massachusetts, 2012.
- Hello, Mama Wallaroo. Charlesbridge, Watertown, Massachusetts, 2013.
- Dirty Rats?. Charlesbridge, Watertown, Massachusetts, 2015.
- The Naturalist: Theodore Roosevelt; A Lifetime of Exploration, and the Triumph of American Natural History. Crown Publishers, New York City, 2016.
- Whose Poop Is That?. Charlesbridge, Watertown, Massachusetts, 2017.
- Whose Footprint Is That?. Charlesbridge, Watertown, Massachusetts, 2019.
