= Neurogymnurus =

Neurogymnurus Temporal range: 33.9–15.97 Ma

Scientific classification
- Kingdom: Animalia
- Phylum: Chordata
- Class: Mammalia
- Order: Eulipotyphla
- Family: Erinaceidae
- Subfamily: Galericinae
- Genus: †Neurogymnurus; Filhol, 1877

Species
- †Neurogymnurus cayluxi Filhol, 1877; †Neurogymnurus indricotherii Lopatin, 1999

Synonyms
- †Cayluxotherium; †Necrogymllurus

Extinct genus of mammals

Neurogymnurus is an extinct genus of gymnures. Species are from the Miocene of Turkey and the Oligocene of the Czech Republic, France, Kazakhstan and Turkey.

Species

- †Neurogymnurus cayluxi Filhol 1877
  - synonym †Cayluxotherium elegans Filhol, 1880
  - synonym †Necrogymllurus cayluxi Filhol, 1877 in M. Friant, 1934, Viret, 1947 and Lavocat, 1951.
- †Neurogymnurus indricotherii Lopatin 1999
