= Galerix =

Galerix Temporal range: Late Oligocene through Pliocene

Scientific classification
- Kingdom: Animalia
- Phylum: Chordata
- Class: Mammalia
- Order: Eulipotyphla
- Family: Erinaceidae
- Subfamily: Galericinae
- Genus: †Galerix; Pomel, 1848

Extinct genus of mammals

Galerix is a prehistoric genus of gymnures. Fossils of these hedgehog-like creatures are found in Europe, Africa, and Asia.

== Taxonomy ==
Nine species are recognized as members of the genus:

- Galerix aurelianensis
- Galerix exilis
- Galerix kostakii
- Galerix remmerti
- Galerix rutlandae
- Galerix saratji
- Galerix stehlini
- Galerix symeonidisi
- Galerix uenayae
