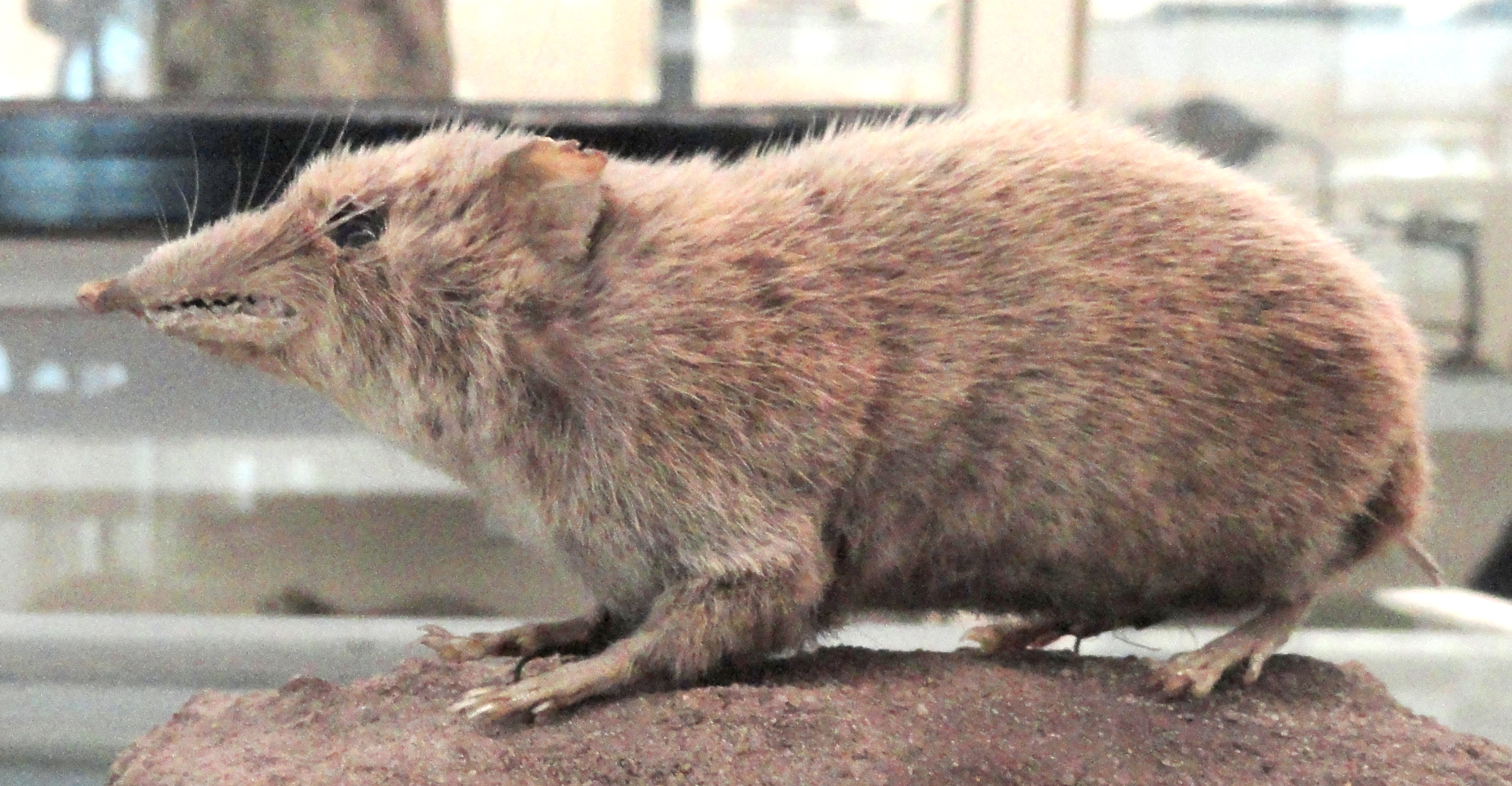
- Hylomys suillus

Scientific classification
- Kingdom: Animalia
- Phylum: Chordata
- Class: Mammalia
- Order: Eulipotyphla
- Family: Erinaceidae
- Subfamily: Galericinae
- Genus: Hylomys; S. Müller, 1840

Type species
- Hylomys suillus S. Müller, 1840

Species
- See text

= Hylomys =

Genus of mammals

Hylomys is a small genus of the family Erinaceidae. Hylomys species, like all species in the subfamily Galericinae, are known as gymnures or moonrats. Their closest relatives include the fossil Lantanotherium and Thaiagymnura and the living Neotetracus and Neohylomys. Members of this genus are found in Southeast Asia and Eastern Asia.

== Species ==
- Hylomys parvus Robinson & Kloss, 1916 (Dwarf gymnure)
- Hylomys suillus S. Müller, 1840 (Short-tailed gymnure)
- Hylomys dorsalis (Bornean short-tailed gymnure)
- Hylomys maxi (Max's short-tailed gymnure)
- Hylomys macarong (Dalat gymnure)
- Hylomys peguensis (Northern short-tailed gymnure)
- Hylomys vorax (Leuser gymnure)
