= Amphechinus =

Amphechinus Temporal range: Oligocene–Miocene

Scientific classification
- Kingdom: Animalia
- Phylum: Chordata
- Class: Mammalia
- Order: Eulipotyphla
- Family: Erinaceidae
- Subfamily: Erinaceinae
- Tribe: †Amphechinini
- Genus: †Amphechinus; Aymard, 1850

Species
- A. akespensis; A. arvernensis; A. baudelotae; A. edwardsi; A. ginsburgi; A. golpeae; A. horncloudi; A. intermedius; A. kreuzae; A. major; A. microdus; A. minutissimus; A. robinsoni; A. taatsiingolensis

Extinct genus of hedgehog

Amphechinus is an extinct genus of hedgehog of the family Erinaceidae, which lived in Asia and Europe during the Oligocene and in North America, Africa, Asia and Europe during the Miocene. The genus contains at least 14 species. It is classified in the subfamily Erinaceinae and in the family Erinaceidae.

A single specimen examined in 1998 was estimated to have had a weight of 175 g (0.39 lb) when alive.

== Characteristics ==
As a member of the family Erinaceidae and in the subfamily Erinaceinae, Amphechinus may have been around the size of the European hedgehog, with males being larger than females.

== Diet ==
Like many other genera in the family Erinaceidae, Amphechinus mostly ate small invertebrates like hedgehogs currently found in Europe, Asia and Africa. They would have eaten beetles, worms, caterpillars and earwigs and other insect species. Although they would have shuffled through the ground to find any insects.

== Distribution ==
Amphechinus may have either lived in forests and dense areas with enough food sources like caterpillars and other insects to eat during the Oligocene roughly 30 million years ago in Asia and Europe in the Miocene.

== Sources ==
- The Beginning of the Age of Mammals by Kenneth D. Rose
