= Oligoechinus =

Oligoechinus Temporal range: Late Oligocene

Scientific classification
- Kingdom: Animalia
- Phylum: Chordata
- Class: Mammalia
- Infraclass: Placentalia
- Order: Eulipotyphla
- Family: Erinaceidae
- Genus: †Oligoechinus
- Species: †O. lanzhouensis

Binomial name
- †Oligoechinus lanzhouensis Li et al., 2019

Extinct genus of mammals

Oligoechinus is an extinct genus of erinaceid that inhabited China during the Oligocene epoch. It contains a single species, O. lanzhouensis.
