= Hainan gymnure =

Conservation status
- Vulnerable (IUCN 3.1)

Scientific classification
- Kingdom: Animalia
- Phylum: Chordata
- Class: Mammalia
- Order: Eulipotyphla
- Family: Erinaceidae
- Genus: Neohylomys
- Species: N. hainanensis

Binomial name
- Neohylomys hainanensis Shaw & Wong, 1959
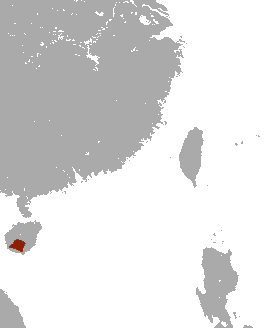
- Hainan gymnure range

Species of mammal

The Hainan gymnure (Neohylomys hainanensis), also known as the Hainan moonrat, is a species of mammal in the family Erinaceidae. Its natural habitat is subtropical or tropical dry forests. It was thought to be endemic to the island of Hainan, China, where it is threatened due to habitat loss, but in 2018 was found to also occur in, and be rather common, in Northern Vietnam.

The Hainan gymnure was once thought to be the only species in the genus Neohylomys. Although previously considered part of the genus Hylomys, gene sequencing of a mitochondrial cytochrome b gene provided evidence that the species is sufficiently distantly related to comprise a genus of its own. Recently, a second species was discovered, the Vietnamese gymnure, and assigned to the genus.

== Description ==
The Hainan gymnure has olive-brown fur with a longitudinal black line on the anterior midback. The species is small, with a length of 15 to 16 cm (5.9 to 6.3 in). The tail makes up approximately 26.3% of this length.

== See also ==
- List of endangered and protected species of China
