= Long-eared gymnure =

Conservation status
- Data Deficient (IUCN 3.1)

Scientific classification
- Kingdom: Animalia
- Phylum: Chordata
- Class: Mammalia
- Order: Eulipotyphla
- Family: Erinaceidae
- Genus: Otohylomys; Lebedev, Abramov & Rozhnov, 2014
- Species: O. megalotis

Binomial name
- Otohylomys megalotis (Jenkins & M. F. Robinson, 2002)
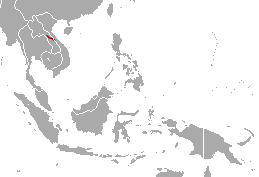
- Long-eared gymnure range

Species of mammal

The long-eared gymnure (Otohylomys megalotis) is an eulipotyphlan that is found in Laos. This specific type of gymnure has long ears and a long skull compared to that of others. It is also recognized for its broad forefeet, stout claws, and naked hindfeet. Previously classified in Hylomys, it is now the only species assigned to the genus Otohylomys.

== Etymology ==
The species epithet megalotis is derived from the two Greek words "megas" and "otos," which means "large" and "ears", respectively.

== Reproduction ==
The pregnancy lasts around six to seven weeks. They are born blind and hairless. However, the hedgehogs can start growing spiny hairs within 36-hours after birth. Only the mothers raise their young ones.

== Description ==
Otohylomys megalotis is a species of gymnure. Compared to species of the Hylomys genus, O. megalotis has rounder, more prominent, and larger ears. Its soles and tarsals are naked, and it has long and moderately stout claws. The skull of O. megalotis is elongated, flattened, and moderately slender.

Compared to the sizes of Hylomys, O. megalotis is medium in size. However, it has a longer tail. Its tail is about 75% of its head and body length. Instead of having flattened spinous hairs, it has grey, long, soft and fine furs. Unlike Hylomys species, O. megalotis has stronger and tougher teeth.

== Habitat and conservation ==
Otohylomys megalotis is primarily found in Khammouan Province, Laos, specifically in Khammouan Limestone National Biodiversity Conservation Area in Thakheck district. It can also be found in the surroundings of Ban Muang and Ban Doy. It is typically found in areas where there are massive limestone karst that is covered in large boulders, with heavily degraded mixture of deciduous forest, scrub, and bamboos.

Currently, there is no known threat to this species.
