= Crocidura annamitensis =

Scientific classification
- Kingdom: Animalia
- Phylum: Chordata
- Class: Mammalia
- Order: Eulipotyphla
- Family: Soricidae
- Genus: Crocidura
- Species: C. annamitensis

Binomial name
- Crocidura annamitensis Jenkins, Lunde & Moncrieff, 2009

Species of mammal

Crocidura annamitensis is a small species of shrew from Vietnam, where it is found in the Annamite Range. It is a small shrew- no more than 60 mm in head and body length, and is gray in color. It has a relatively short tail.
