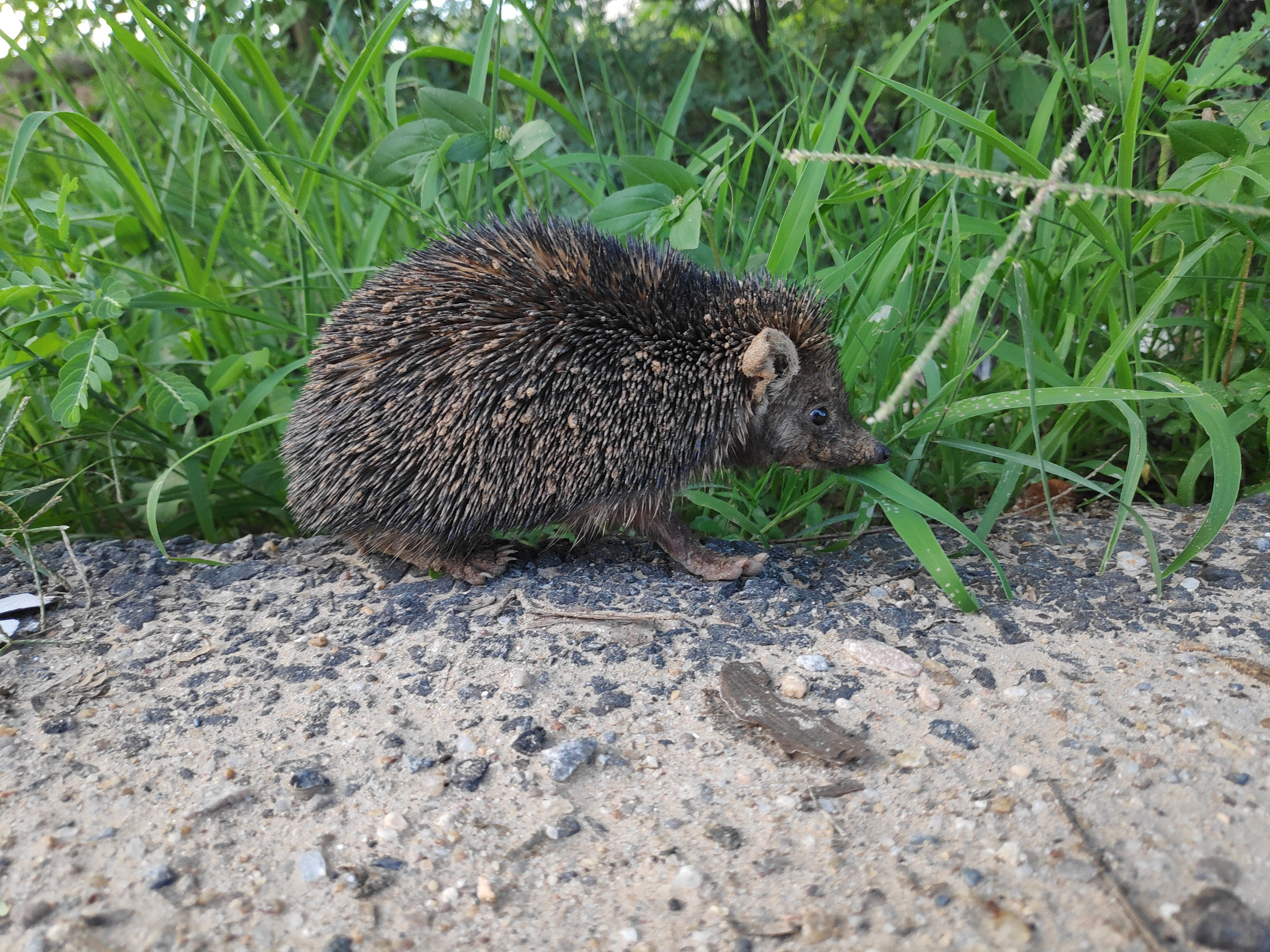

Conservation status
- Least Concern (IUCN 3.1)

Scientific classification
- Domain: Eukaryota
- Kingdom: Animalia
- Phylum: Chordata
- Class: Mammalia
- Order: Eulipotyphla
- Family: Erinaceidae
- Genus: Hemiechinus
- Species: H. collaris

Binomial name
- Hemiechinus collaris (Gray, 1830)
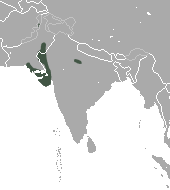
- Indian long-eared hedgehog range

= Indian long-eared hedgehog =

Species of mammal

The Indian long-eared hedgehog (Hemiechinus collaris) is a small species of mammal native to northern India and Pakistan. It is insectivorous and nocturnal. It has been noted as a carrier of tick-borne diseases.

== Description ==
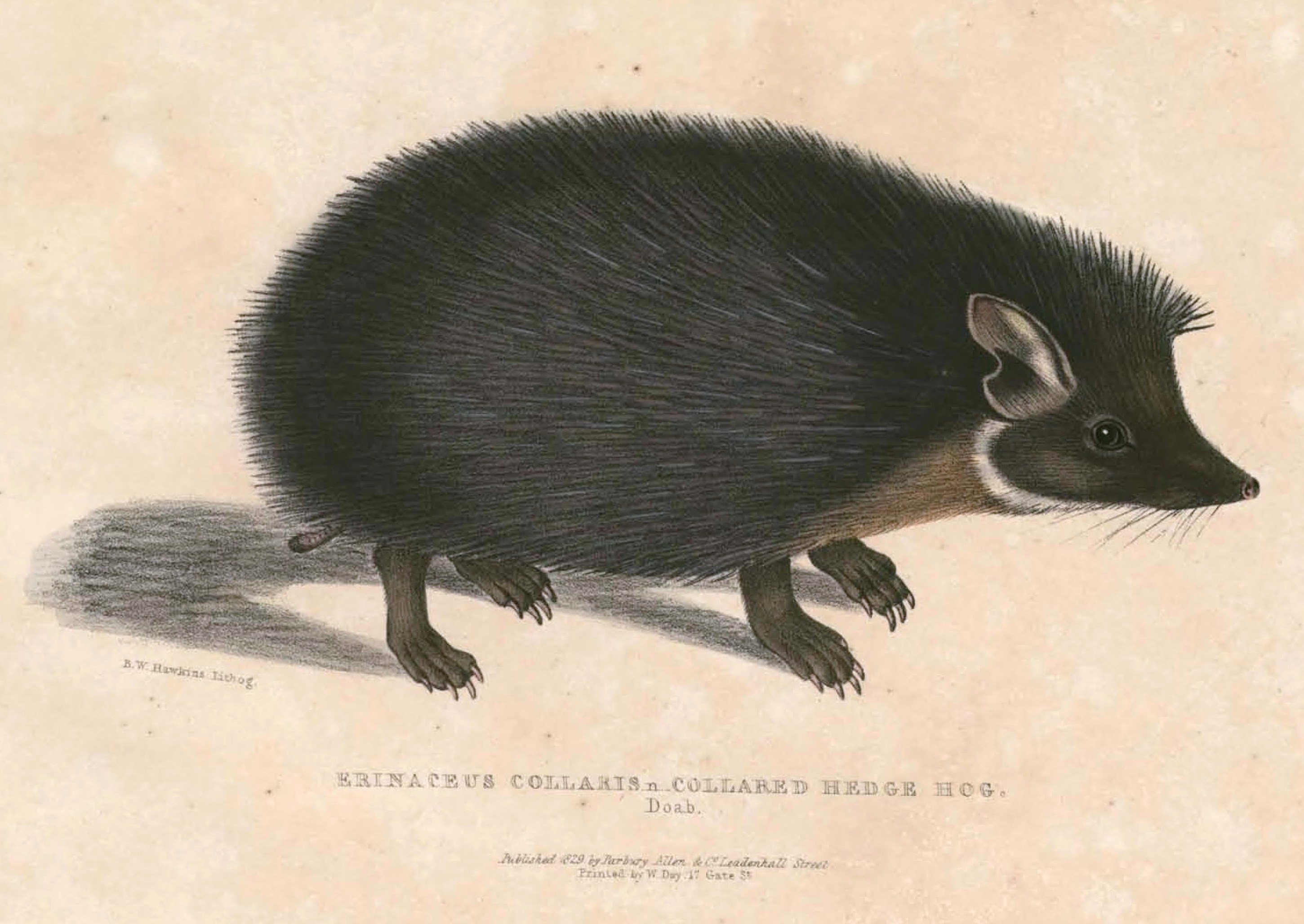
Illustration of Hemiechinus collaris

The Indian long-eared hedgehog is a relatively small hedgehog (~17 cm, 200–500 grams). It is a nocturnal animal that is often found inhabiting burrows. Similar to most hedgehogs it has spines on its back, embedded into a muscle sheath. This sheath forms a bag-like structure that the animal can hide inside for protection. It can also erect its spines to further protect from predators. The Indian long-eared hedgehog has a well developed set of senses because of its large ears, eyes and whiskers near its snout. These senses, especially smell, help them find food and/or a possible partner.

== Diet ==
The Indian long-eared hedgehog is insectivorous, feeding on small insects. Because of their arid desert habitat they often receive most of the water they need from their food supply.

== Distribution ==
The Indian long-eared hedgehog is found in India (Gujarat, Rajasthan and Uttar Pradesh) and Pakistan (North West Frontier Province, Punjab and Sindh). It experiences extreme heat in the months of May and June and very cold weather in December and January.

== Reproduction ==
They are seasonal breeders. The males are active from March to August while the females are active from April to August. It is notable for a quite complex mating ritual that involves "dancing" around females for several days before mating.
