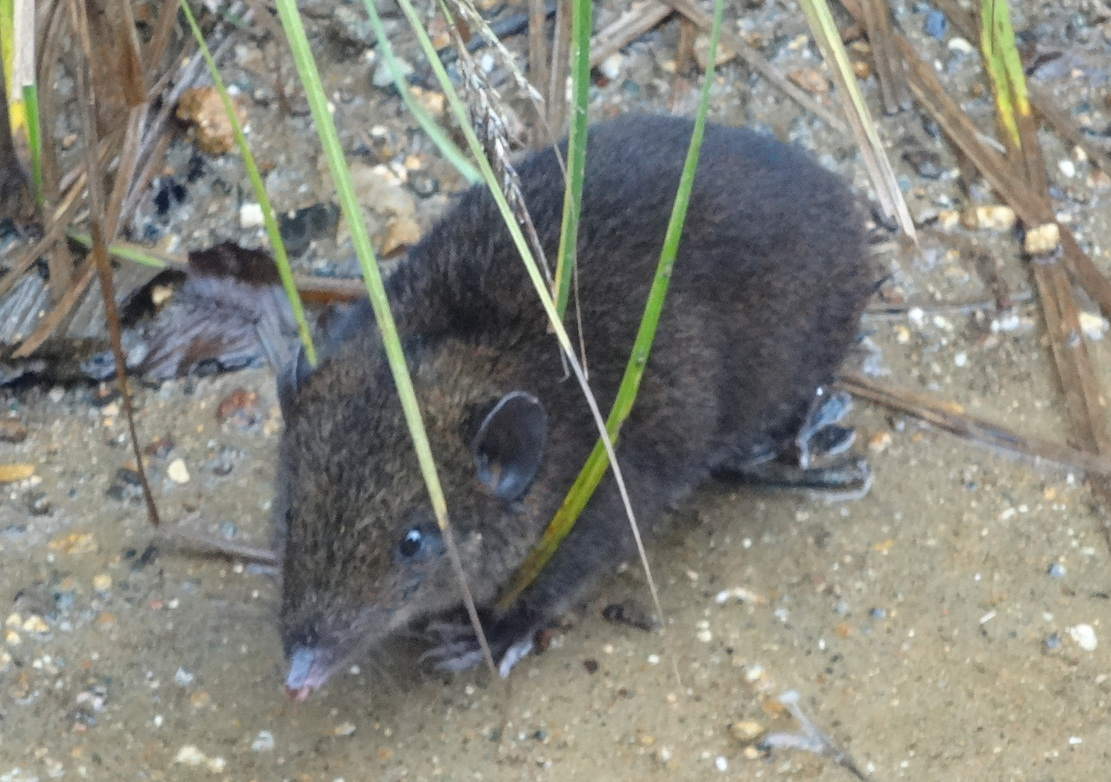
- Bornean short-tailed gymnure

Scientific classification
- Kingdom: Animalia
- Phylum: Chordata
- Class: Mammalia
- Order: Eulipotyphla
- Family: Erinaceidae
- Subfamily: Galericinae; Pomel, 1848

Genera
- †Apulogalerix; †Deinogalerix; †Dzavui; Echinosorex; †Eochenus; †Eogalericius; †Galerix; Hylomys; †Lantanotherium; †Microgalericulus; Neohylomys; Neotetracus; †Neurogymnurus; †Ocajila; †Oligochenus; †Parasorex; Podogymnura; †Proterix; †Protogalericius; †Pseudoneurogymnurus; †Riddleria; †Schizogalerix; †Tetracus; †Thaiagymnura

= Gymnure =

Gymnures

Subfamily of mammals

Gymnures, also called hairy hedgehogs or moonrats, are mammals belonging to the subfamily Galericinae, in the family Erinaceidae and the order Eulipotyphla. Gymnures may resemble rats but are not closely related; they are not rodents at all, but instead are closely related to hedgehogs, being their sister group within Erinaceidae. They are thought to have appeared in Eastern Asia before their closest relatives, and changed little from the original ancestor, which is thought to have been also the ancestor of the shrews.

== Description ==
Although the gymnures are closest related to the hedgehogs, full-grown gymnures superficially resemble large rats, shrews, and opossums as a result of convergent evolution.

The gymnure's body plan is believed to resemble that of the earliest mammals, with a large, toothy head about 1/3 the length of the total body, a naked furless tail for balance and thermoregulatory purposes, and a plantigrade stance. In direct contrast to the closely related hedgehogs, gymnures are not spiny.

Gymnures are primarily carnivorous. They are nocturnal or crepuscular: they come out to forage at twilight or in the night to search the forest floor, using their outstanding sense of smell and tactile response in the snout region, to forage for food. Gymnures eat various arthropods, mice, small reptiles and amphibians, with occasional fruit and fungi.

Gymnures keep territories, and individuals are solitary except when breeding. Gymnures have a very strong scent, typically described as a rancid garlic or onion smell, which is produced by its territory marking scent glands. Several creatures similar in form and niche, such as the opossum and solenodon, have an odor similar to the gymnure's.

=== Distribution ===
Gymnures inhabit moist jungle terrain in various locales of Southeast Asia, including Vietnam, Sumatra, China and the Malay Peninsula. Fossil gymnures such as Deinogalerix have been found from Europe.

== Classification ==
This subfamily has alternately been called Echinosoricinae, Galericinae, and Hylomyinae. Some researchers prefer Hylomyinae because the specific relationships of the extinct genus Galerix to living erinaceids are uncertain. There are fifteen extant species in six genera:

- Genus Echinosorex
  - Echinosorex gymnura (moonrat)
- Genus Hylomys
  - Hylomys parvus (dwarf gymnure)
  - Hylomys suillus (Javan short-tailed gymnure or lesser moonrat)
  - Hylomys dorsalis (Bornean short-tailed gymnure)
  - Hylomys maxi (Max's short-tailed gymnure)
  - Hylomys macarong (Dalat gymnure)
  - Hylomys peguensis (Northern short-tailed gymnure)
  - Hylomys vorax (Leuser gymnure)
- Genus Neohylomys
  - Neohylomys hainanensis (Hainan gymnure or Hainan moonrat)
- Genus Neotetracus
  - Neotetracus sinensis (shrew gymnure)
- Genus Otohylomys
  - Otohylomys megalotis (Long-eared gymnure)
- Genus Podogymnura
  - Podogymnura aureospinula (Dinagat gymnure or Dinagat moonrat)
  - Podogymnura intermedia (Eastern Mindanao gymnure )
  - Podogymnura minima
  - Podogymnura truei (Mindanao gymnure or Mindanao moonrat)
