= Proterix =

Proterix Temporal range: Late Oligocene–Early Miocene

Scientific classification
- Kingdom: Animalia
- Phylum: Chordata
- Class: Mammalia
- Order: Eulipotyphla
- Family: Erinaceidae
- Genus: †Proterix; Matthew, 1903

Species
- †P. bicuspis; †P. loomisi

Extinct genus of mammals

Proterix is an extinct genus of erinaceid mammal from the Late Oligocene to the Early Miocene of North America.

== Ecology ==
Proterix was most likely a burrowing insectivore. The original reference suggests reduced limbs may be possible, due to the unusually high number of lumbar vertebrae, but cautions that conclusions must be reserved until a complete skeleton is found. This proposal was exaggerated in a popular science book by Dougal Dixon, which speculated that it may have been a limbless mammal with an armored head. Though very little of the post-cranial skeleton has been found, this situation is typical for mammals and not an indicator of unusual anatomy.
