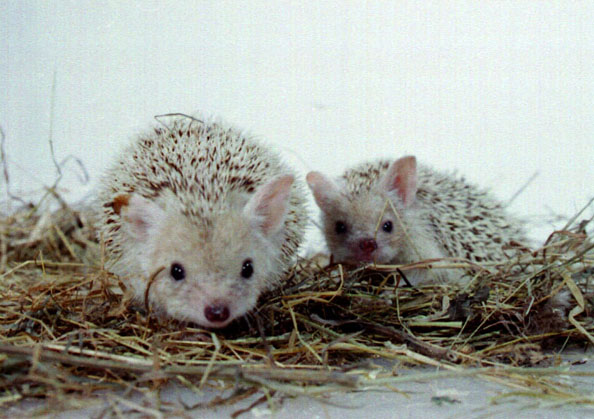
- H. auritus

Scientific classification
- Domain: Eukaryota
- Kingdom: Animalia
- Phylum: Chordata
- Class: Mammalia
- Order: Eulipotyphla
- Family: Erinaceidae
- Subfamily: Erinaceinae
- Genus: Hemiechinus; Fitzinger, 1866

Type species
- Erinaceus platyotis Sundevall, 1842

Species
- H. auritus H. collaris

= Hemiechinus =

Genus of mammals

Hemiechinus is a genus of hedgehogs. It contains two species, found in Central and South Asia.

== Species ==
- Long-eared hedgehog (Hemiechinus auritus)
- Indian long-eared hedgehog (Hemiechinus collaris)
