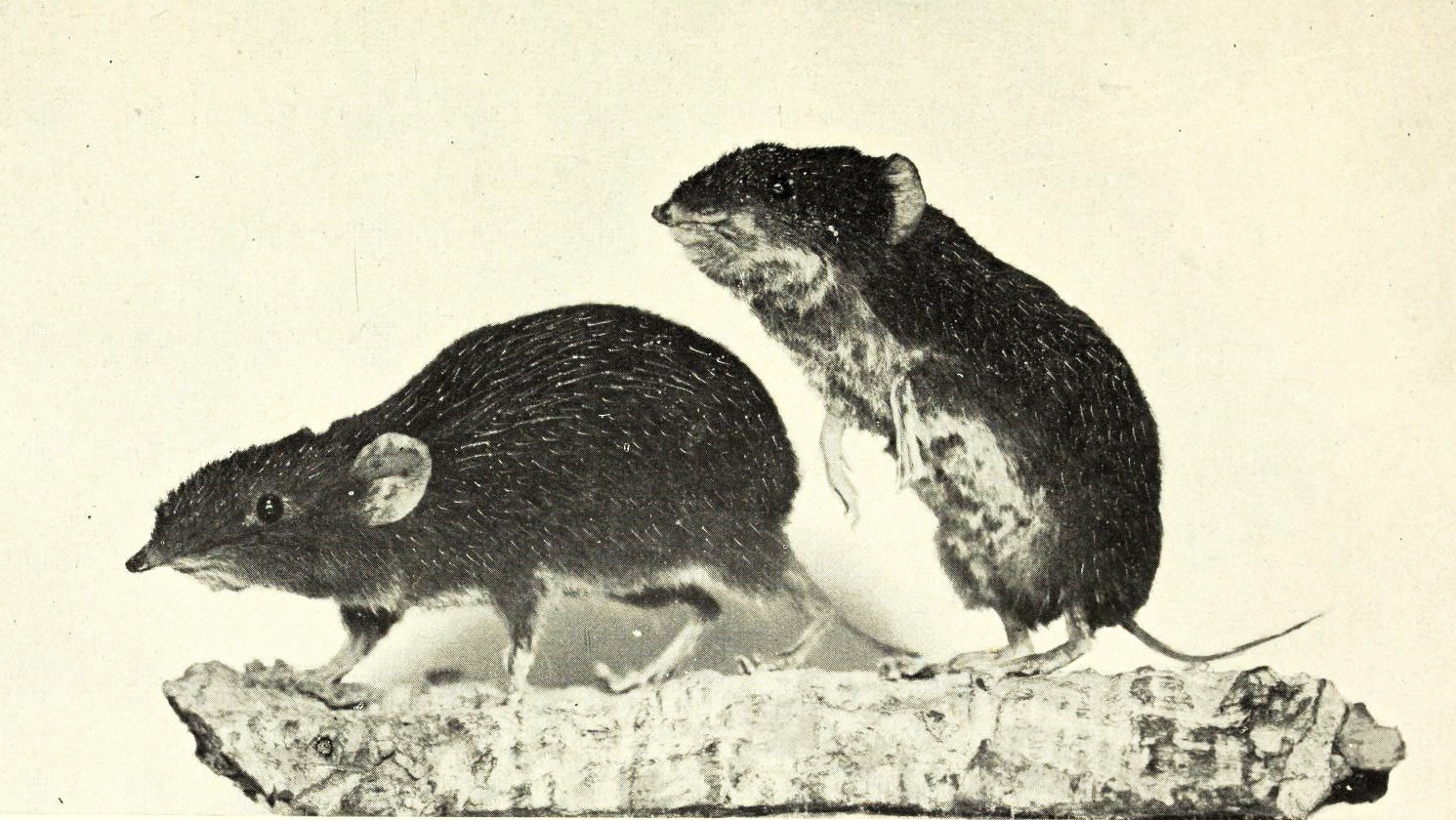

Conservation status
- Least Concern (IUCN 3.1)

Scientific classification
- Kingdom: Animalia
- Phylum: Chordata
- Class: Mammalia
- Order: Eulipotyphla
- Family: Erinaceidae
- Subfamily: Galericinae
- Genus: Neotetracus
- Species: N. sinensis

Binomial name
- Neotetracus sinensis Trouessart, 1909
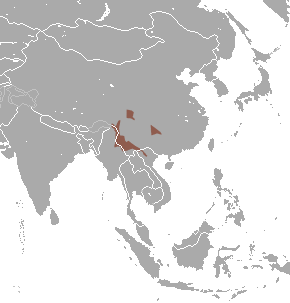
- Shrew gymnure range

= Shrew gymnure =

Species of mammal

The shrew gymnure, or shrew hedgehog (Neotetracus sinensis), is a species of mammal in the family Erinaceidae and is the only extant species in the genus Neotetracus. It is found in China, Myanmar, and Vietnam.

== Description ==
The shrew gymnure's coat is soft, dense, and quite long. The back coat color ranges from olive-brown, cinnamon-brown, and a mixed cream/black color. On the underside of the body, the coat color is usually red, grey, or cream-colored. In some shrew gymnures, the sides of the neck and head are tinged with red. A faint black dorsal stripe may also be present. Its tail is lightly covered with tiny hairs. In comparison to other members of its family, the shrew gymnure has a longer tail, shorter snout, and fewer teeth.

== Behavior ==
Shrew gymnures reside in cool, damp forests between 300 and 2700 m altitude. Within their range, shrew gymnures can be found beneath logs and rocks and also dwell in burrows characterized by moss and fern cover. They are strictly terrestrial, as well as nocturnal. Breeding season for the shrew gymnure extends throughout the year, with a probable limit of two litters per year.

== Diet ==
This mammal's diet consists mostly of invertebrates.
