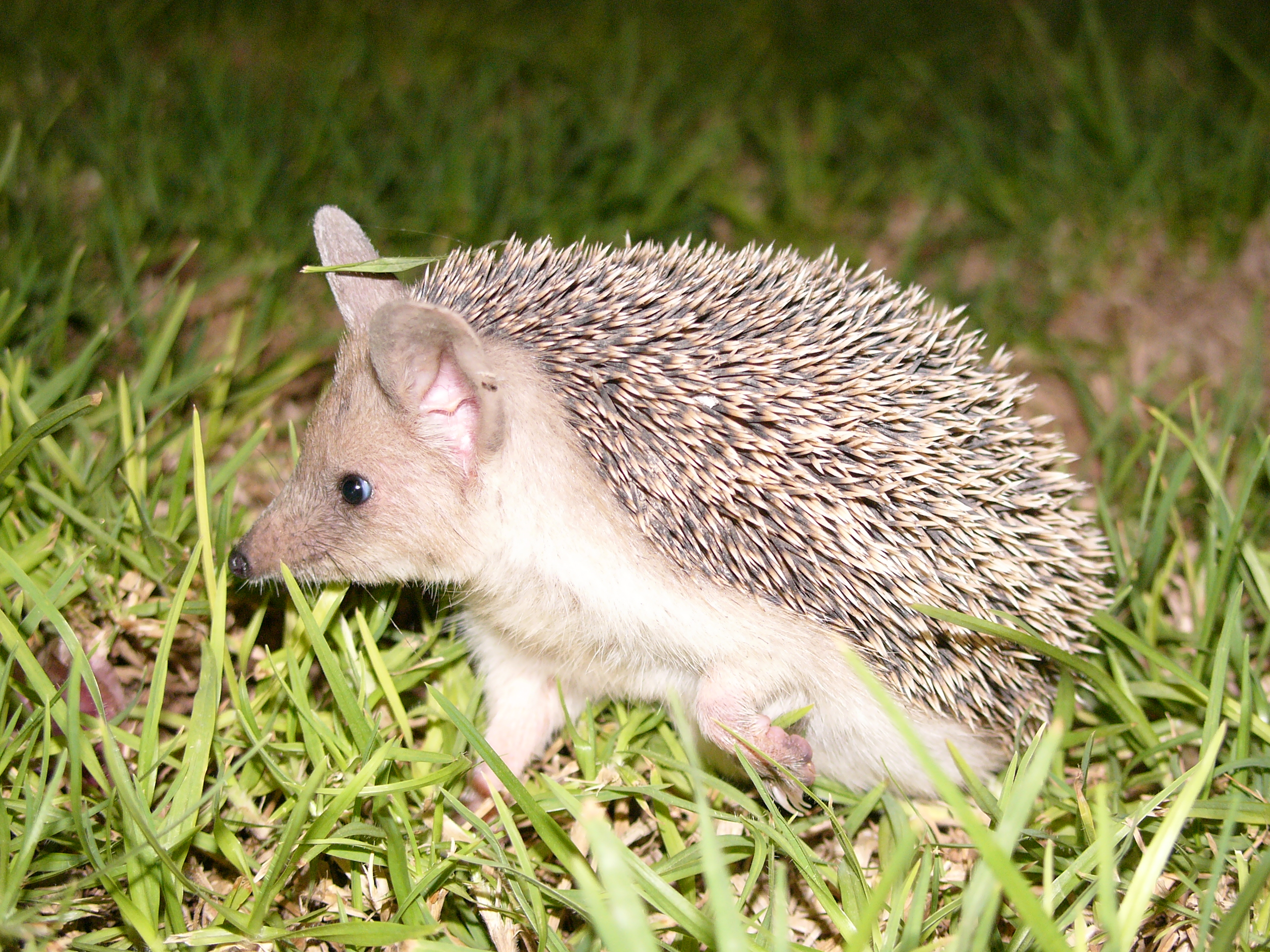

Conservation status
- Least Concern (IUCN 3.1)

Scientific classification
- Kingdom: Animalia
- Phylum: Chordata
- Class: Mammalia
- Order: Eulipotyphla
- Family: Erinaceidae
- Genus: Hemiechinus
- Species: H. auritus

Binomial name
- Hemiechinus auritus (Gmelin, SG, 1770)

Subspecies
- H.a. auritus H.a. albulus H.a. aegyptius H.a. libycus H.a. megalotis
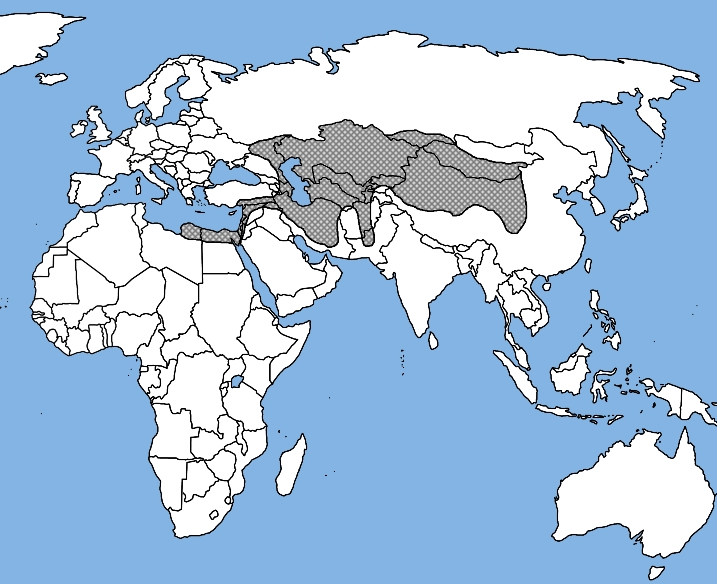
- Geographic range of the long-eared hedgehog

= Long-eared hedgehog =

Species of mammal

The long-eared hedgehog (Hemiechinus auritus) is a species of hedgehog native to Central Asian countries and some countries of the Middle East. The long-eared hedgehog lives in burrows that it either makes or finds and is distinguished by its long ears. It is considered one of the smallest Middle Eastern hedgehogs. This hedgehog is insectivorous but may also feed on small vertebrates and plants. In captivity they can live for over 7 years. Wild hedgehogs have been found to carry Rhipicephalus sanguineus, the brown dog tick, which can transmit Boutonneuse fever.

== Description ==
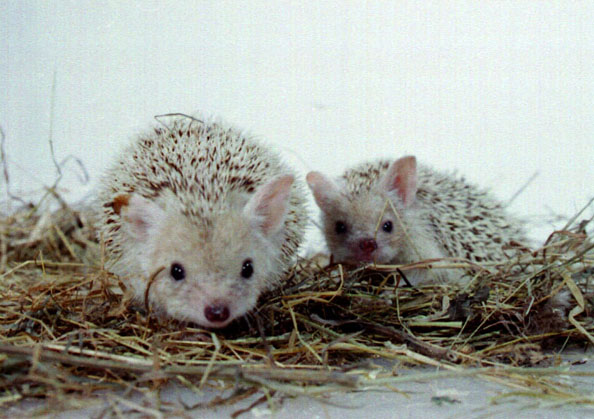
Long-eared hedgehogs in Leningrad Zoo

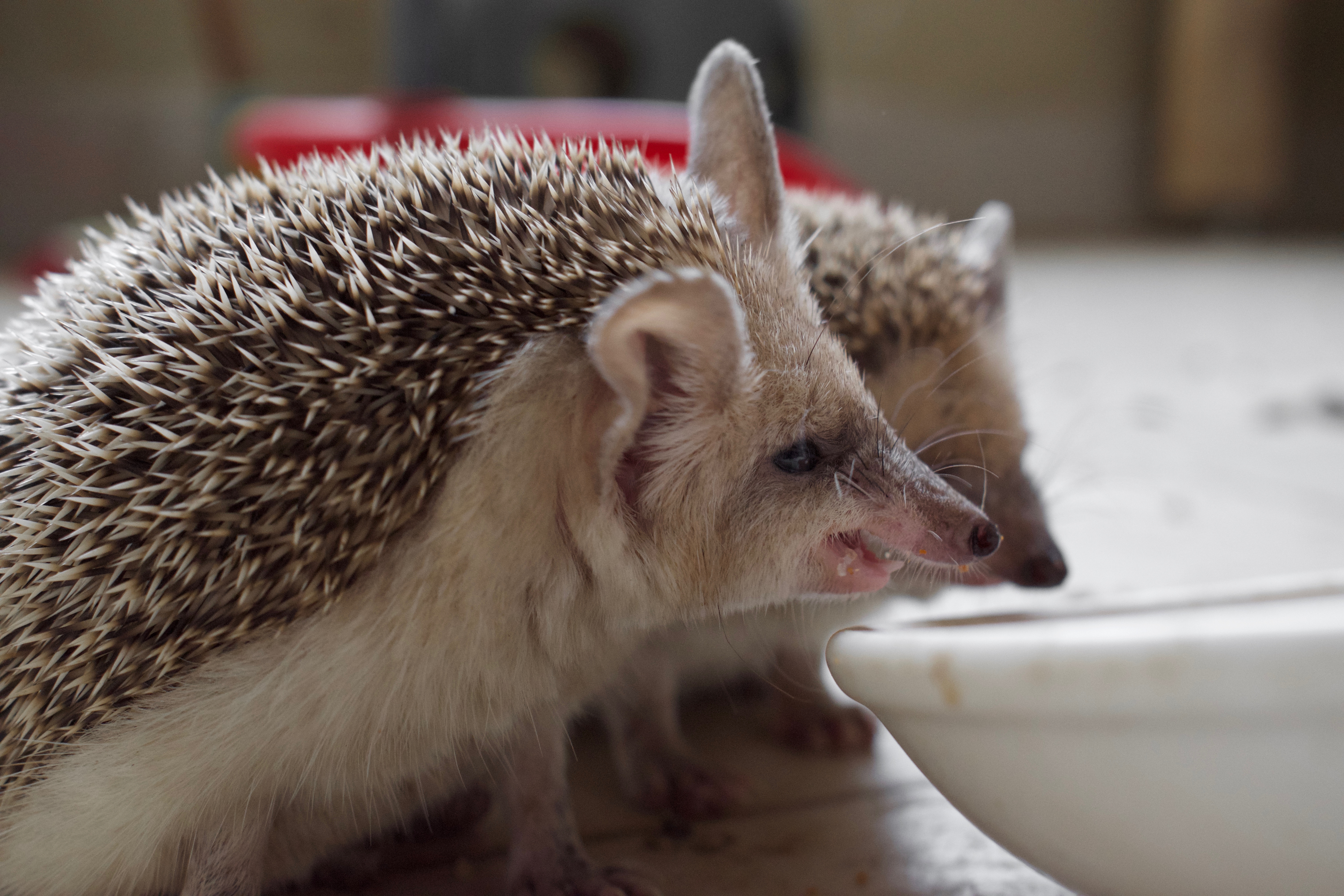
Pet hedgehogs eating

The length of the head and body of the long-eared hedgehog is approximately 120–270 mm, and the tail is 10–50 mm long. The skull is about 38–48 mm long. Unlike other species the pterygoids of the skull do not inflate and they do not relay information to the tympanic membrane. The ears of this hedgehog are 30–45 mm longer than the closest spine. They are used for heat radiation in the desert. Long-eared hedgehogs have great senses of hearing and smell that they use to hunt out food and detect predators. The long-eared hedgehog's spines are embedded in a unique muscle sheath that forms a bag-like structure which acts as protection for the hedgehog. They can withdraw into this pouch and erect their spines out to fend off predators if need be. The dorsal spines are white on the tip with darker banding below. They do not have dark and light areas on their faces. Also they do not have a gap of spines on the back of their necks that is common to other species of hedgehogs. The long-eared hedgehog has a light-colored underside along with whitish hairs on the tips of their ears. The tops and heels of their feet are covered with hair but the soles are bare.

The long-eared hedgehog is smaller than the West European hedgehog; it weighs between 250–400 grams, and is much faster. It is less likely to curl up in a ball when approached by predators and will rather try and outrun or leap at predators with their relatively short needles.

== Diet ==
The long-eared hedgehog is an insectivore; 70% of its diet consists of insects, with some worms and a tiny amount of slugs and snails. The idea that these animals eat only slugs and snails is an unfounded assumption, as these comprise only about 5% of their natural diet. The breakdown of a wild hedgehog's diet is as follows: 30% beetles, 25% caterpillars, 11% earthworms, 10% bird eggs, 5% mammal meat, 5% slugs and snails, 3% millipedes, 3% earwigs, 2% bees, 1% bird meat and 5% that has been undefined by researchers. This diet breakdown is not specific to Hemiechinus auritus but a generalization about most hedgehog species.

More specific to this species, Hemiechinus auritus is an insectivore that forages in the early evening looking for insects (such as grasshoppers and beetles), myriapods, gastropods, batrachians (amphibians), small vertebrates (such as lizards), eggs, fruits and plants. It may even eat snakes or other vertebrates by curling up to protect its underside as it eats the struggling prey. They prefer to live near a water source. However, if this is not available they depend on their food source for their water intake The long-eared hedgehog is active throughout much of the year and hibernates for shorter periods of time. The longest reported hibernation is 40 days. This hibernation may come in the summer or the winter. Also this hedgehog will travel up to 9 km during the night in search of food.

== Predators ==
The long-eared hedgehog is hunted by the Eurasian eagle owl and makes up about 14% of the predatory birds' diet. It has been reported as prey for the Pharaoh eagle-owl in the Azraq Nature Reserve in Jordan. The Long-eared hedgehog is a host of the Acanthocephalan intestinal parasite Moniliformis cryptosaudi and Pachysentis ehrenbergi in Egypt.

== Distribution and habitat ==
Hemiechinus auritus has a range that extends from the eastern Mediterranean region, through the arid and steppe areas of Asia to western Pakistan in the south; and from eastern Ukraine through Mongolia (Gobi desert), to China (Xinjiang). This species is native to the following countries: Afghanistan, China, Cyprus, Egypt, Iran, Iraq, Israel, Kyrgyzstan, Lebanon, Libya, Mongolia, Pakistan, Russia, Syria, Tajikistan, Turkey, Turkmenistan, Ukraine and Uzbekistan.

The long-eared hedgehog prefers to stay in intermediate climates, avoiding the hot desert and the northern colder mountain areas. They also prefer areas with moderate rainfall of 100–400 mm.

The long-eared hedgehog inhabits a few different types of dry steppes, semi-deserts, and deserts. It prefers dry river valleys, gullies, forest shelter belts, abandoned irrigation ditches and shrubby areas, and often settles in oases and around human settlements (sometimes in cultivated habitats). They live in burrows that they dig under bushes with a length of 45 cm long with only one opening. They may also inhabit abandoned burrows of other small mammals. They are nocturnal solitary hedgehogs. During the day they are found resting under rocks, hollows or rock piles.

== Reproduction ==
The long-eared hedgehog only breeds once a year in the summer months of July through September. The presence of spines does not inhibit this species ability to reproduce. Long-eared hedgehogs gestation period is 35–42 days. The female has 8–10 nipples and often has 2–3 babies. After just one week the babies start eating solid food. They are born with very few spines and within five hours after birth the spines have doubled in size. After two weeks the babies are fully covered with their new spines.

== Impact ==
Long eared hedgehogs can be agriculturally beneficial since they eat harmful organisms like termites and scorpions. They are not found to damage crops since they live in areas that are mostly waste land and desert.
