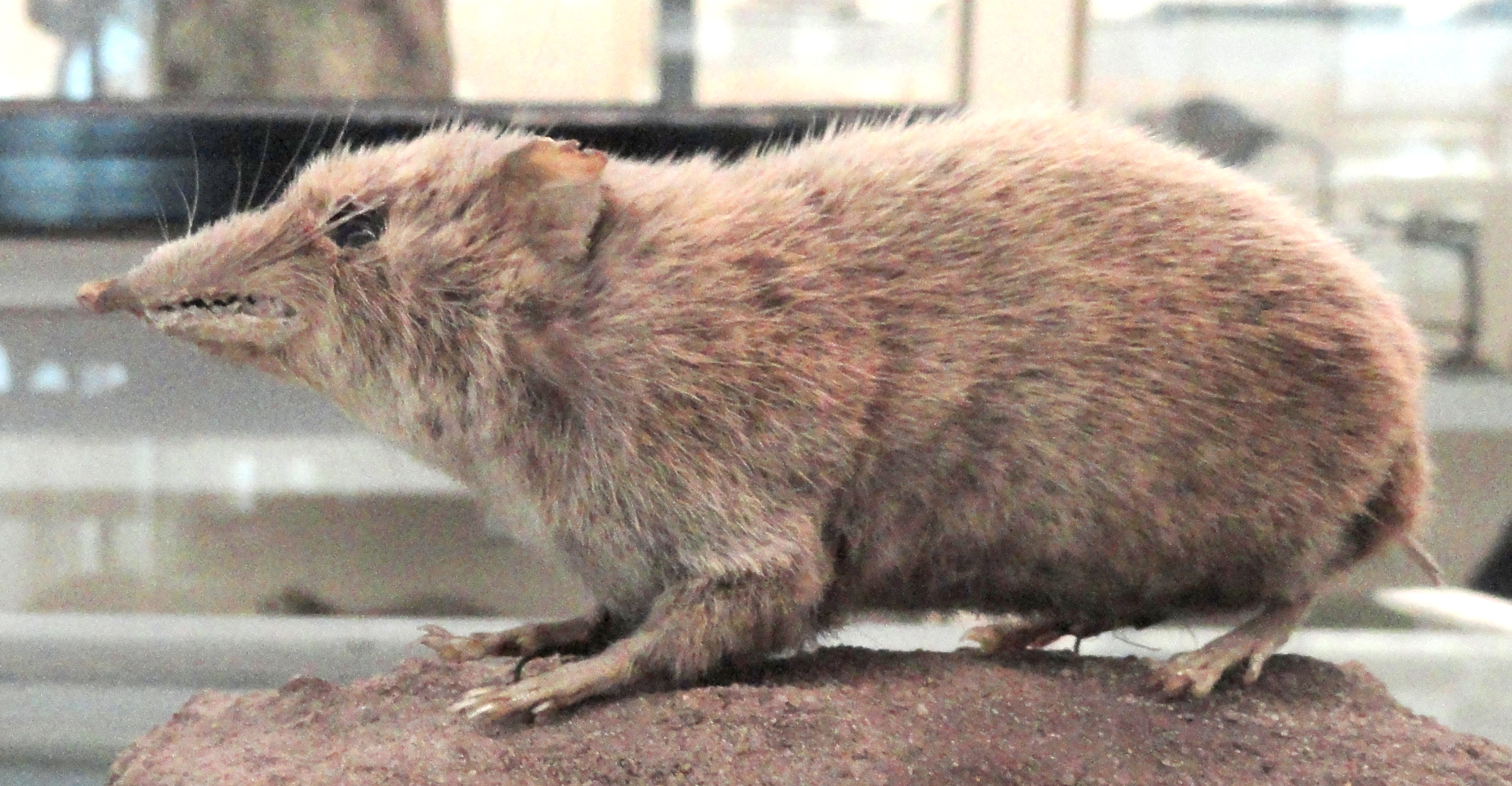

Conservation status
- Least Concern (IUCN 3.1)

Scientific classification
- Kingdom: Animalia
- Phylum: Chordata
- Class: Mammalia
- Order: Eulipotyphla
- Family: Erinaceidae
- Genus: Hylomys
- Species: H. suillus

Binomial name
- Hylomys suillus S. Müller, 1840
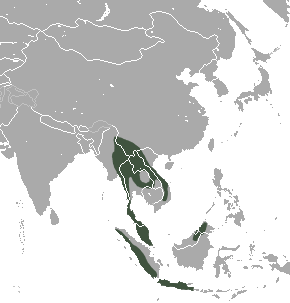
- Short-tailed gymnure range, including H. suillus and all current species that were formerly a part of the species

= Javan short-tailed gymnure =

Species of mammal

The Javan short-tailed gymnure (Hylomys suillus) is a small mammal from the family of the Erinaceidae. The scientific name of the species is first published by Salomon Müller in 1840. This species used to include the dorsalis, maxi, and peguensis subspecies, but these have now been elevated to species of their own: the Bornean short-tailed gymnure, Max's short-tailed gymnure, and the northern short-tailed gymnure. In addition, two new species were created from two other populations of H. suillus. The range of this species is now limited to Java.

== Description ==
The upperparts of the short-tailed gymnure are reddish brown to dark brown, with a grey tinge. The underparts are light grey, with white-tipped hairs. It resembles a large shrew, with a long snout and a very short hairless tail. It also has rounded, leathery ears. The head and body length is 12–14 cm (4.7–5.5 in) and the tail length measures 2–3 cm (0.79–1.18 in)

== Habits and habitat ==
The short-tailed gymnure is active both during day and at night. It lives in hilly and montane forests up to 3,000 m (9,800 ft), and sometimes in humid lowland forests. It feeds mainly on insects on the ground but also sometimes takes fruit. It normally does not live any longer than 2 years.

== Distribution ==
The species lives on the Indonesian island of Java.
