= Dwarf gymnure =

- Stuffed specimen

Conservation status
- Vulnerable (IUCN 3.1)

Scientific classification
- Kingdom: Animalia
- Phylum: Chordata
- Class: Mammalia
- Order: Eulipotyphla
- Family: Erinaceidae
- Genus: Hylomys
- Species: H. parvus

Binomial name
- Hylomys parvus Robinson & Kloss, 1916
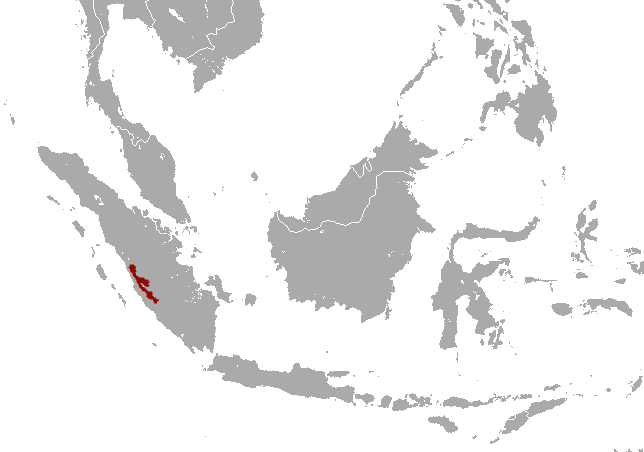
- Dwarf gymnure range

Species of mammal

The dwarf gymnure (Hylomys parvus) is a gymnure found only at Mount Kerinci, Sumatra, Indonesia. It is listed by the International Union for Conservation of Nature as a vulnerable species due to a restricted range.

The dwarf gymnure was first described as a separate taxon in 1916, but it was not considered a valid species until it was more closely examined in 1994.

This small animal, measuring only 4-5 inches, has a foul scent, especially when threatened. It has an average lifespan of about 2 years and a gestation period of about 30–35 days.
