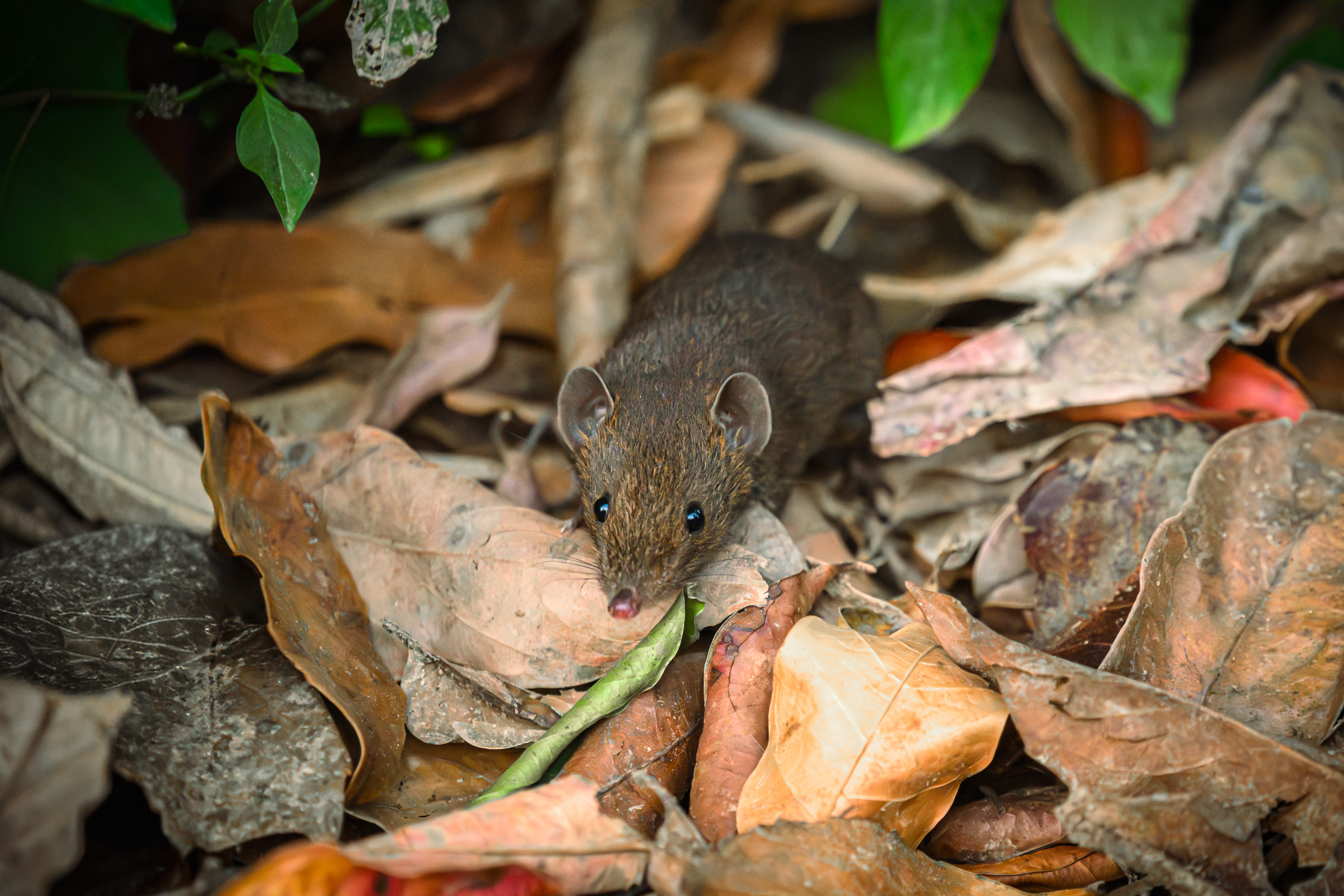
- Northern short-tailed gymnure from Kaeng Krachan National Park

Scientific classification
- Kingdom: Animalia
- Phylum: Chordata
- Class: Mammalia
- Order: Eulipotyphla
- Family: Erinaceidae
- Genus: Hylomys
- Species: H. peguensis

Binomial name
- Hylomys peguensis Blyth, 1859

= Northern short-tailed gymnure =

Species of mammal

The northern short-tailed gymnure (Hylomys peguensis) is a gymnure in China, Thailand, Laos, Vietnam, Cambodia, Myanmar, and peninsular Malaysia. It was previously recognized as a subspecies of H. suillus, but now is regarded as a full species.
