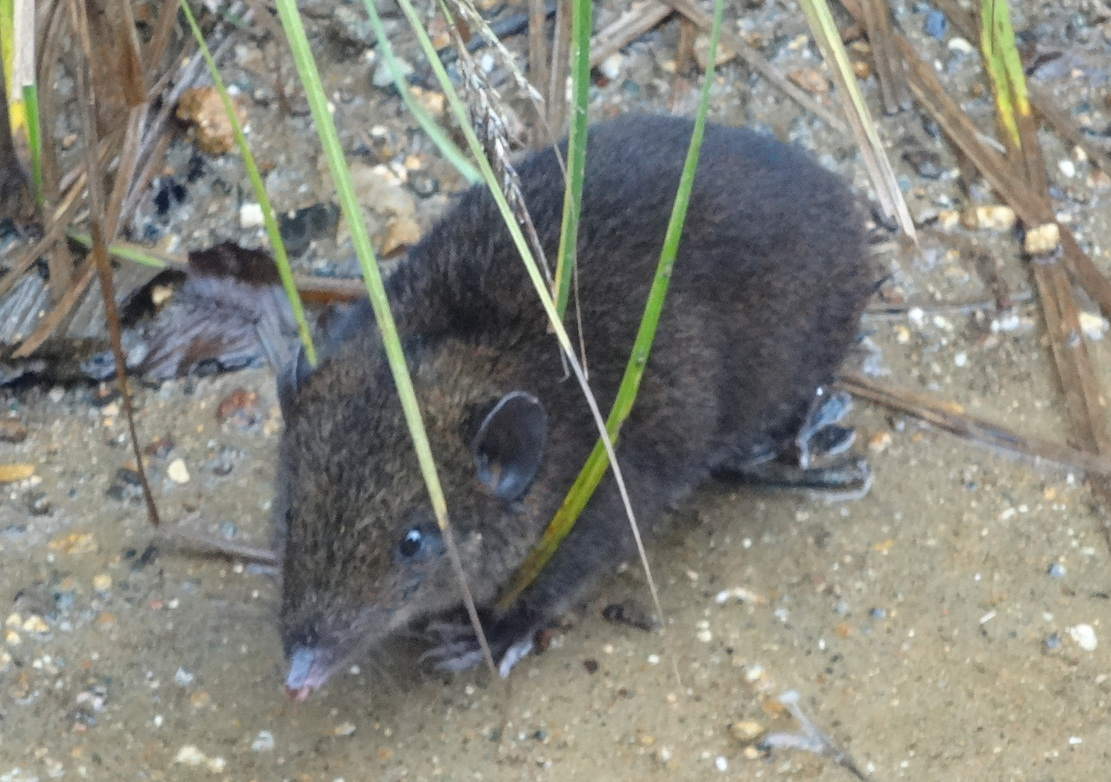

Scientific classification
- Kingdom: Animalia
- Phylum: Chordata
- Class: Mammalia
- Order: Eulipotyphla
- Family: Erinaceidae
- Genus: Hylomys
- Species: H. dorsalis

Binomial name
- Hylomys dorsalis Thomas, 1888

= Bornean short-tailed gymnure =

Species of mammal

The Bornean short-tailed gymnure (Hylomys dorsalis) is a gymnure. It was previously recognized as a subspecies of H. suillus, but it was elevated to full species in 2023.

It is endemic to mountain areas in the countries of Indonesia, Malaysia, and Brunei in northern Borneo.

== Description ==
Adults in the Bornean population display a distinct to faint black sagittal stripe, generally restricted to the nape/shoulder area, but can extend to the rump.
