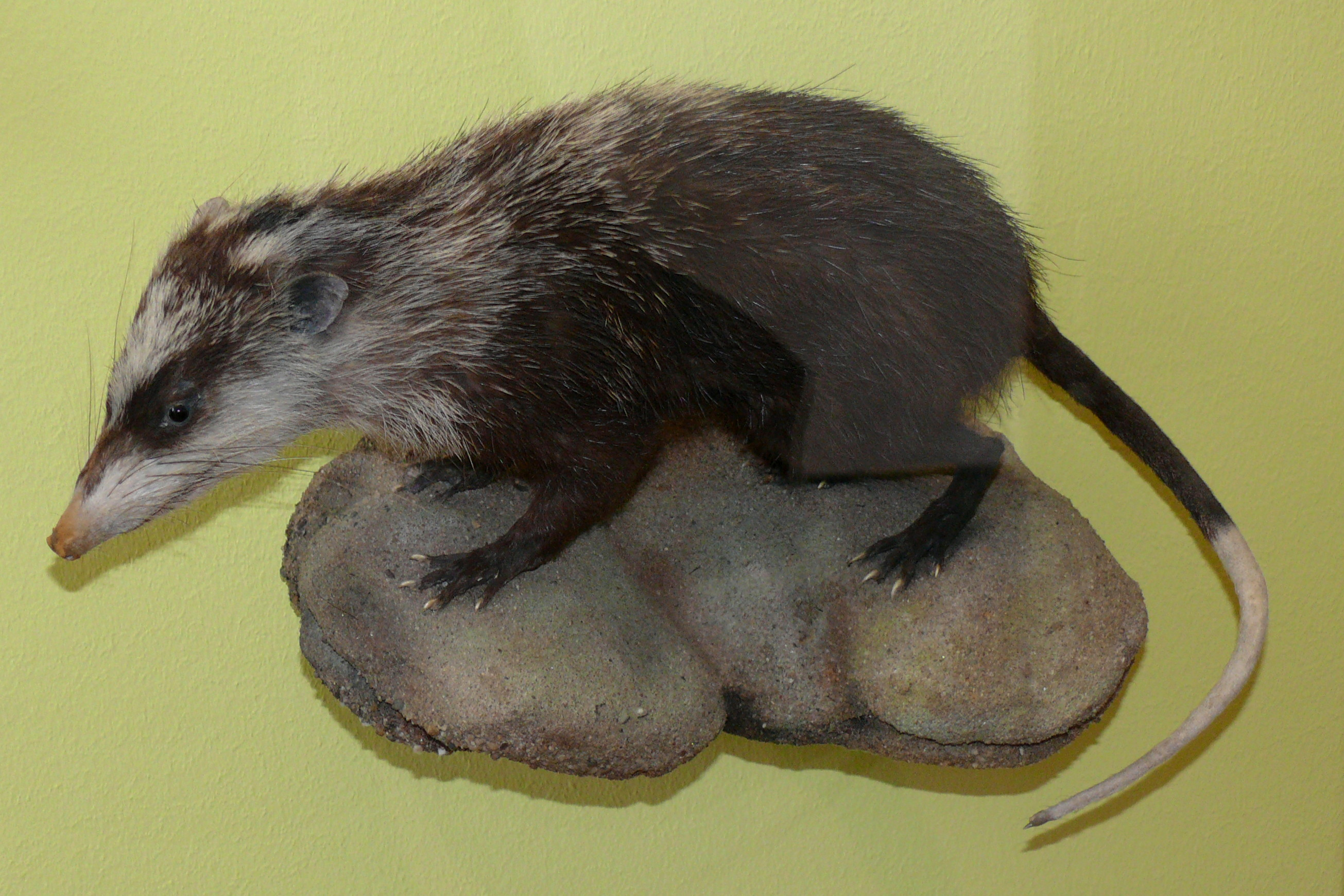

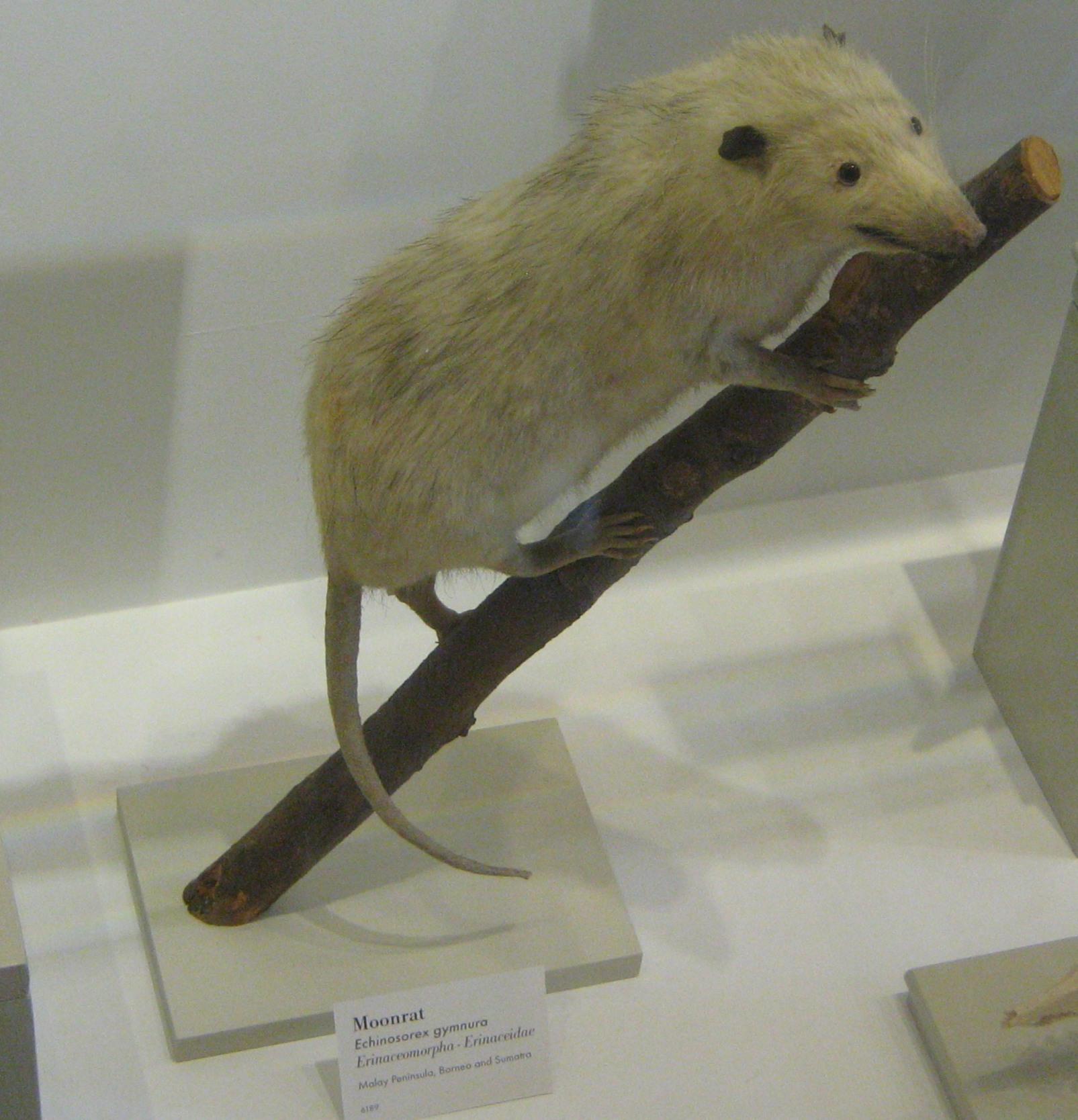
- Museum specimens of the two moonrat subspecies: E. g. gymnura (above); E. g. alba (below)

Conservation status
- Least Concern (IUCN 3.1)

Scientific classification
- Kingdom: Animalia
- Phylum: Chordata
- Class: Mammalia
- Order: Eulipotyphla
- Family: Erinaceidae
- Subfamily: Galericinae
- Genus: Echinosorex; Blainville, 1838
- Species: E. gymnura

Binomial name
- Echinosorex gymnura (Raffles, 1822)
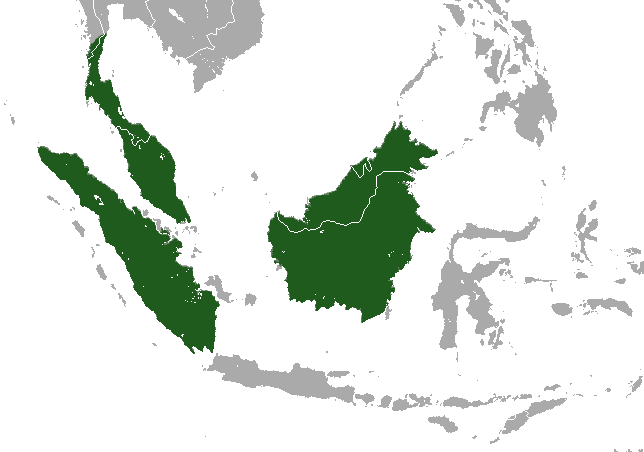
- Moonrat range

= Moonrat =

Species of mammal in the Erinaceidae family

The moonrat (Echinosorex gymnura) is a fairly small and primarily carnivorous mammal native to Southeast Asia. It is the only species in the genus Echinosorex within the family Erinaceidae, which includes hedgehogs and gymnures. Despite its name, the moonrat is not closely related to rats or other rodents. The scientific name is sometimes given as Echinosorex gymnurus, but this is incorrect.

== Description ==
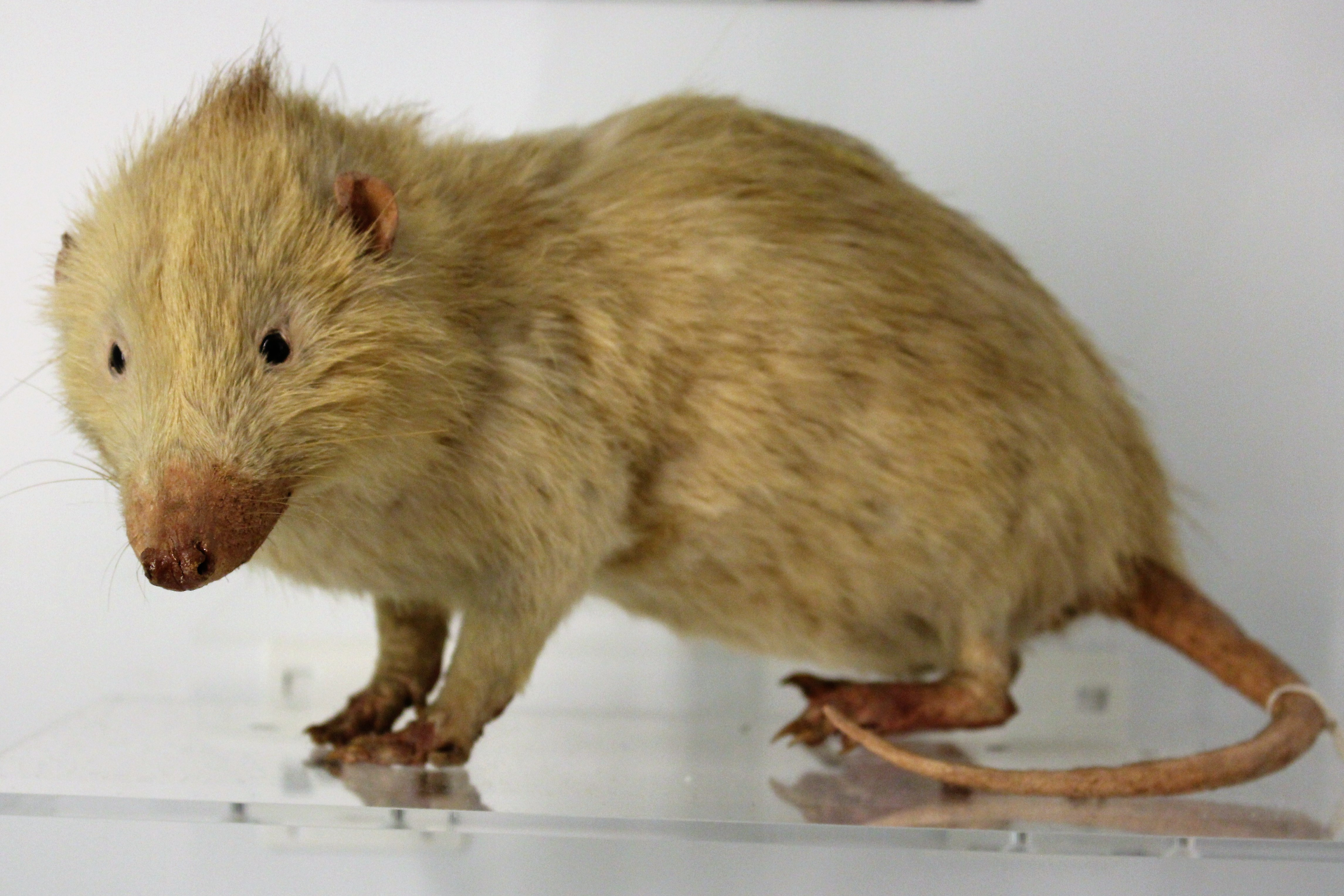
Stuffed specimen at the Cambridge University Museum of Zoology, england

The moonrat has a distinct pungent odor with strong ammonia content, different from the musky smell of carnivorans. There are two subspecies: E. g. gymnura is found in Sumatra and the Thai-Malay Peninsula; E. g. alba is found in Borneo. In the former the head and frontal half of the body are white or grey-white; the remaining is mainly black. The latter subspecies is generally white (alba means white in Latin), with a sparse scattering of black hairs; it appears totally white from a distance. Those from western Borneo tend to have a greater proportion of black hairs than those from the east, but animals from Brunei appear intermediate. Largely white E. g. gymnura also occur, but they are rare.

Head and body length is 32–40 cm (13–16 in), tail length is 20–29 cm (7.9–11.4 in), hind foot length is 6.5–7.5 cm (2.6–3.0 in) and weight is 870–1,100 g (1.92–2.43 lb). The dental formula is 3.1.4.33.1.4.3 × 2 = 44. It is possibly the largest member of the order Erinaceomorpha, although the European hedgehog likely weighs a bit more at 1,000 g (2.2 lb) and up to 2,000 g (4.4 lb).

== Ecology and habitat ==
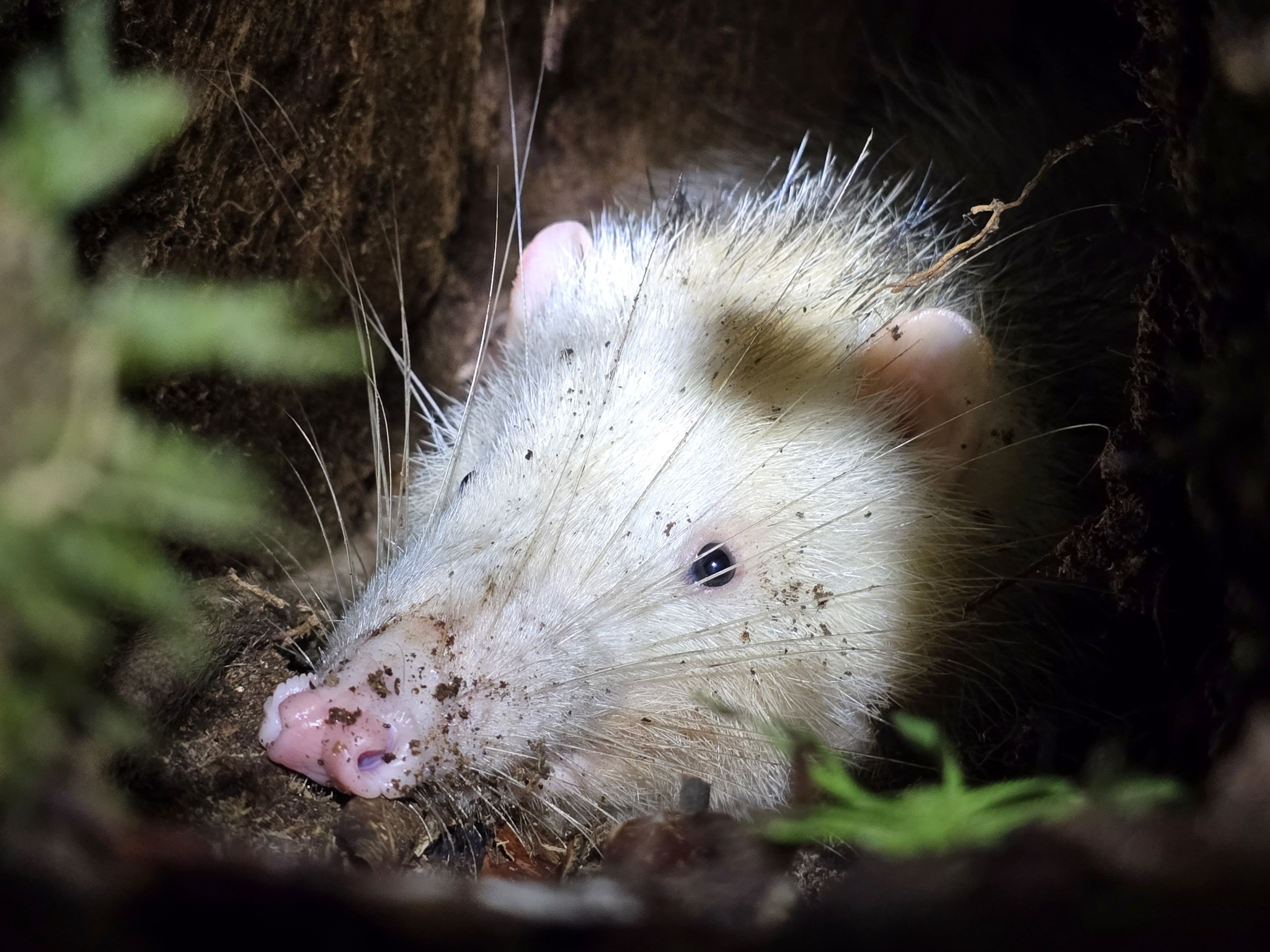
In Malaysia

Moonrats are nocturnal and terrestrial, lying up under logs, roots or in abandoned burrows during the day. They inhabit moist forests including mangrove and swamp forests and often enter water. In Borneo, they occur mainly in forests, but in peninsular Malaysia they are also found in gardens and plantations. They feed on earthworms and various small animals, mostly arthropods. The moonrat is a host of the acanthocephalan intestinal parasite Moniliformis echinosorexi.

== Lifespan ==
The lifespan of the moonrat is up to five years.

== Conservation status ==
The moonrat is not considered a threatened species. The main threat to the moonrat is deforestation activities due to human development for agriculture, plantation, and commercial logging. Moreover, other demands from Penan in Borneo for food and traditional medicinal contribute to decreasing numbers of moonrats in Borneo. The species is also found in protected areas, including Matang National Park and Kuching Wetlands National Park. Its IUCN status is Least Concern.

== Economic importance ==
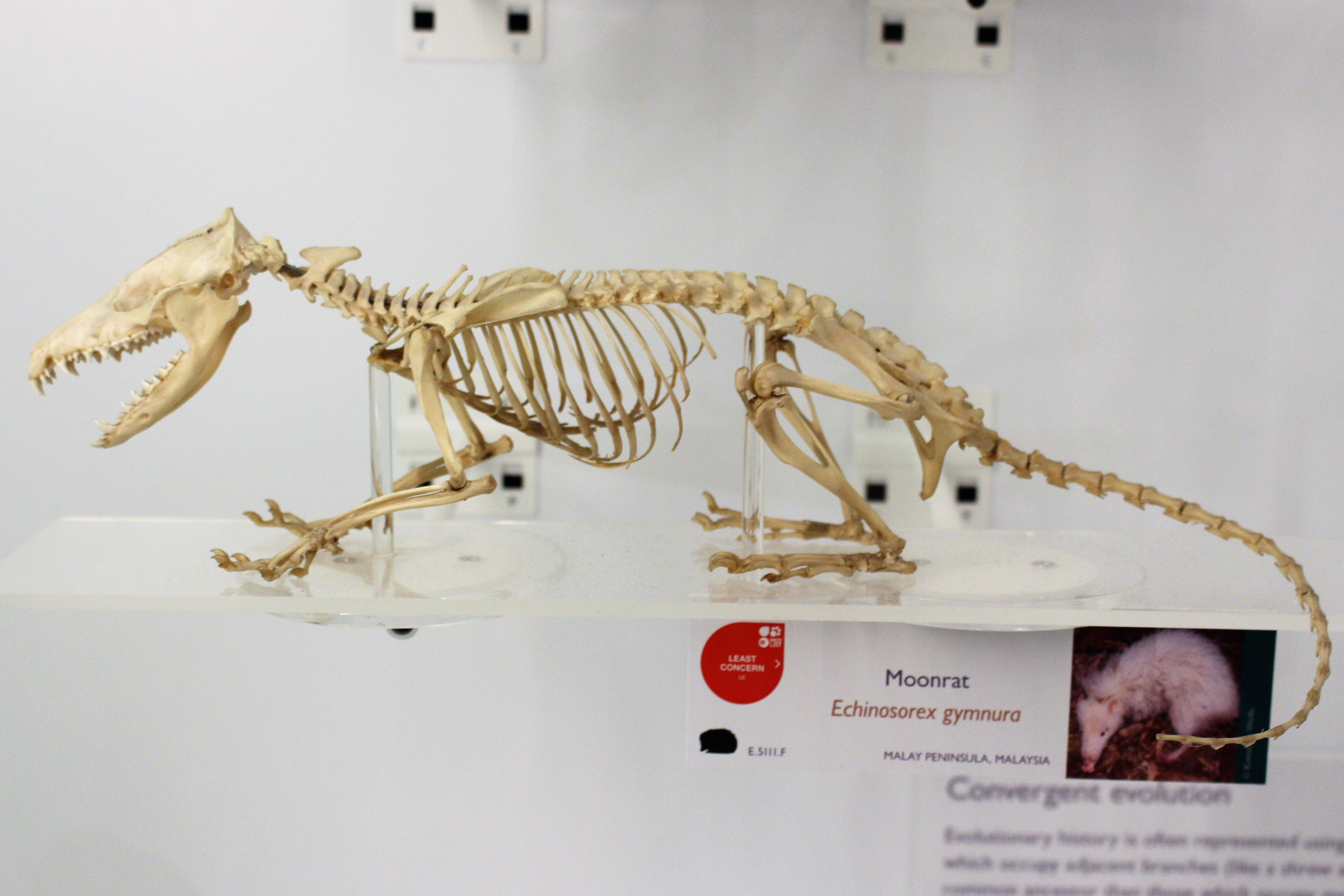
Skeleton

The Penan in Borneo used to trade moonrat meat for other foods and goods among themselves and for money.

== In culture ==
In Thailand, moonrat is known as nhoo muen (Thai: หนูเหม็น, pronounced [nǔː mɯ̂an], lit. 'smelly rat'). The name refers to its rat-like appearance and the strong odor of its body, reminiscent of ammonia. Traditionally, it is believed that the bones of the moonrat can be used to protect against black magic, sorcery, and love charms.

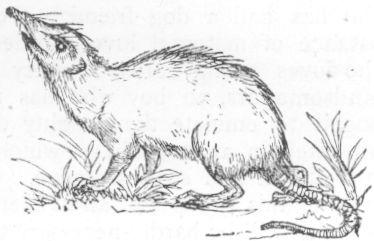
Echinosorex gymnura drawing
