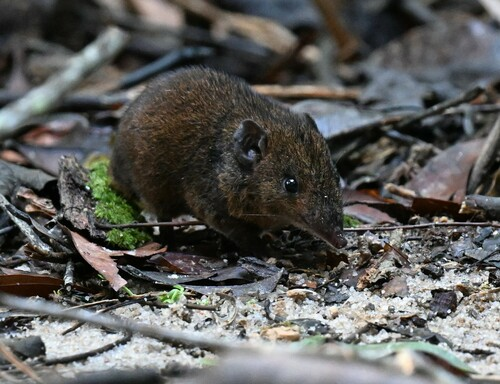

Scientific classification
- Kingdom: Animalia
- Phylum: Chordata
- Class: Mammalia
- Order: Eulipotyphla
- Family: Erinaceidae
- Genus: Hylomys
- Species: H. maxi

Binomial name
- Hylomys maxi Sody, 1933

= Max's short-tailed gymnure =

Species of mammal

Max's short-tailed gymnure (Hylomys maxi) is a gymnure that lives in Malaysia and Indonesia. It was previously recognized as a subspecies of H. suillus, but now is regarded as a full species.

== Distribution and habitat ==
In Sumatra (Indonesia), this species has been found between 100 and 2,000 m (330 and 6,560 ft) above sea level. On the Malay Peninsula, its range is restricted to between 600 and 1,700 m (2,000 and 5,600 ft) above sea level. Its northern range on the peninsula may extend into very southern Thailand.
