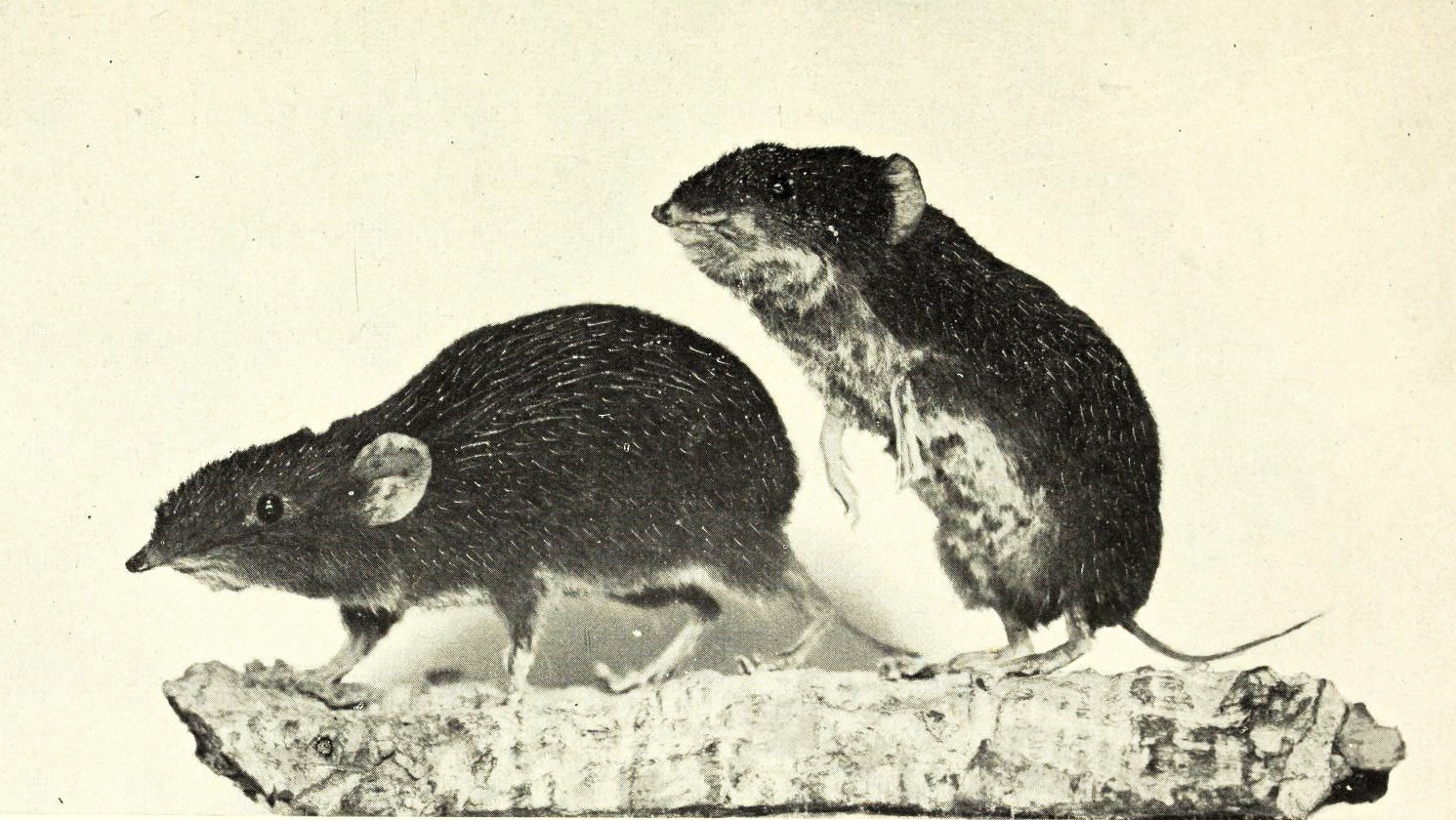

Scientific classification
- Kingdom: Animalia
- Phylum: Chordata
- Class: Mammalia
- Order: Eulipotyphla
- Family: Erinaceidae
- Subfamily: Galericinae
- Genus: Neotetracus; Trouessart, 1909

Type species
- Neotetracus sinensis Trouessart, 1909

Species
- Neotetracus sinensis; †Neotetracus butleri

= Neotetracus =

Neotetracus Temporal range: Miocene - Recent

Genus of mammals

Neotetracus is a genus of gymnure that contains a single extant species, the shrew gymnure (Neotetracus sinensis) of China and Southeast Asia.

Another fossil species is also known from the Miocene of Thailand, Neotetracus butleri.
