= Neohylomys =

Scientific classification
- Kingdom: Animalia
- Phylum: Chordata
- Class: Mammalia
- Order: Eulipotyphla
- Family: Erinaceidae
- Subfamily: Galericinae
- Genus: Neohylomys; Shaw and Wong, 1959

Genus of mammal

Neohylomys is a genus of gymnure. Two species are currently assigned to this genus:

- Neohylomys hainanensis Shaw & Wong, 1959
- Neohylomys vietnamensis A.A. Bannikova, Lebedev, Gorchkhanov, Fei, Dinh, Bui, Kruskop, Rozhnov & Abramov, 2024
