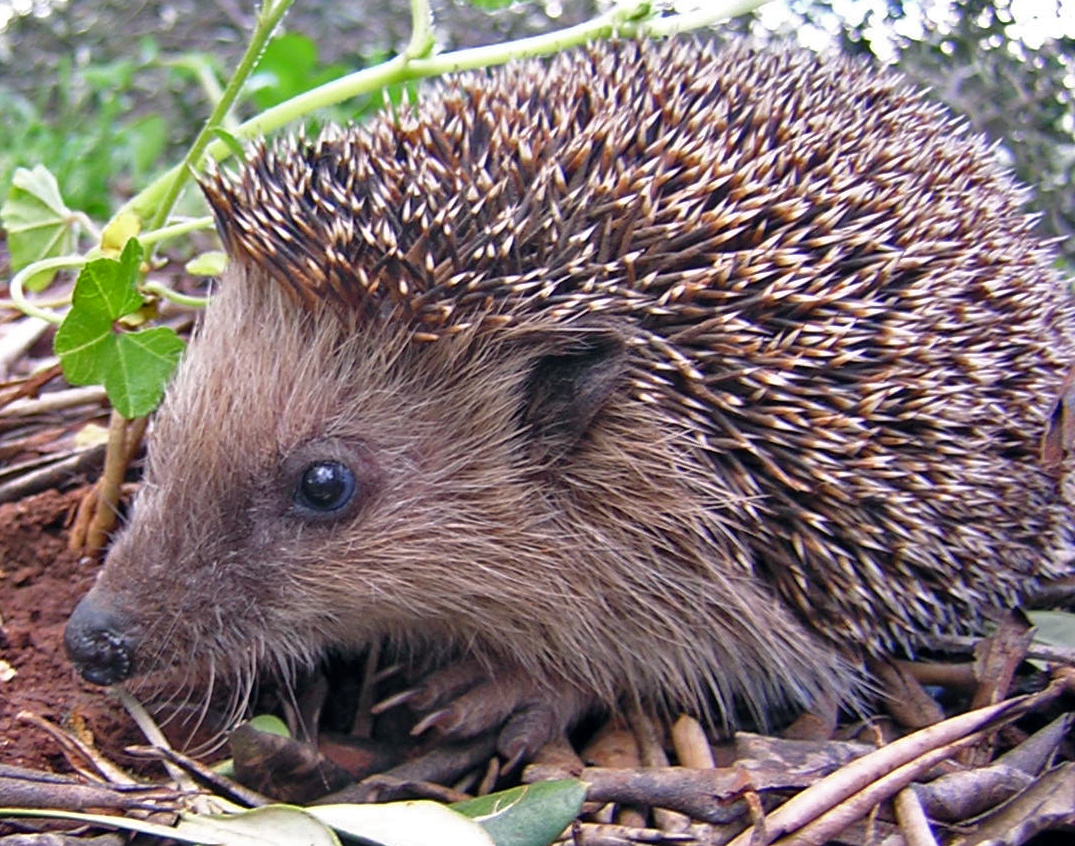
- Erinaceus europaeus (European hedgehog)
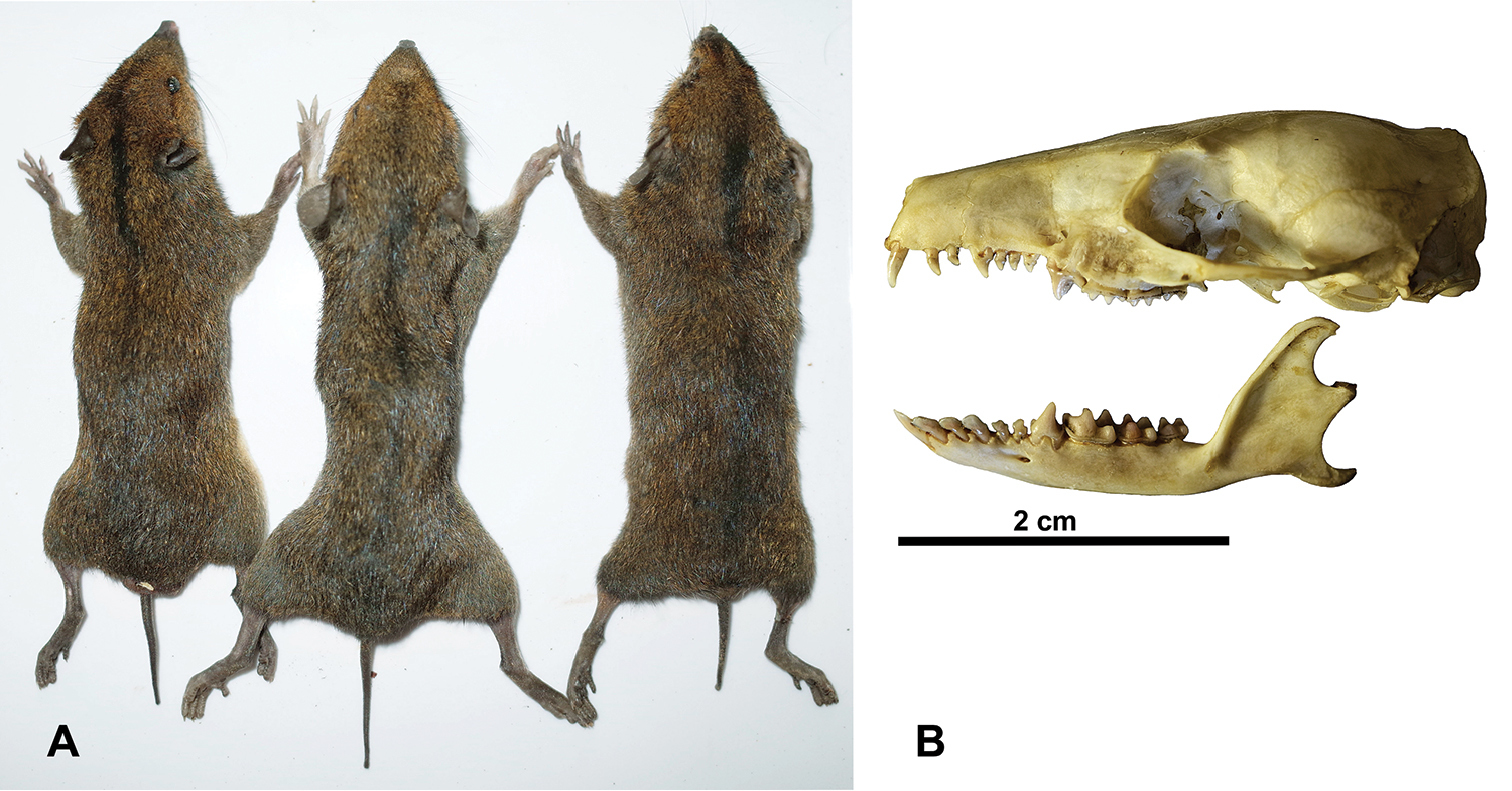
- Neohylomys hainanensis (Hainan gymnure)

Scientific classification
- Kingdom: Animalia
- Phylum: Chordata
- Class: Mammalia
- Order: Eulipotyphla
- Family: Erinaceidae; G. Fischer, 1814

Type genus
- Erinaceus Linnaeus, 1758

Subfamilies and genera
- †Silvacola; †Oligoechinus; †Proterix; Erinaceinae; †Amphechinus; Atelerix; Erinaceus; Hemiechinus; Mesechinus; Paraechinus; Galericinae; †Deinogalerix; Echinosorex; †Galerix; Hylomys; Neohylomys; Neotetracus; Podogymnura
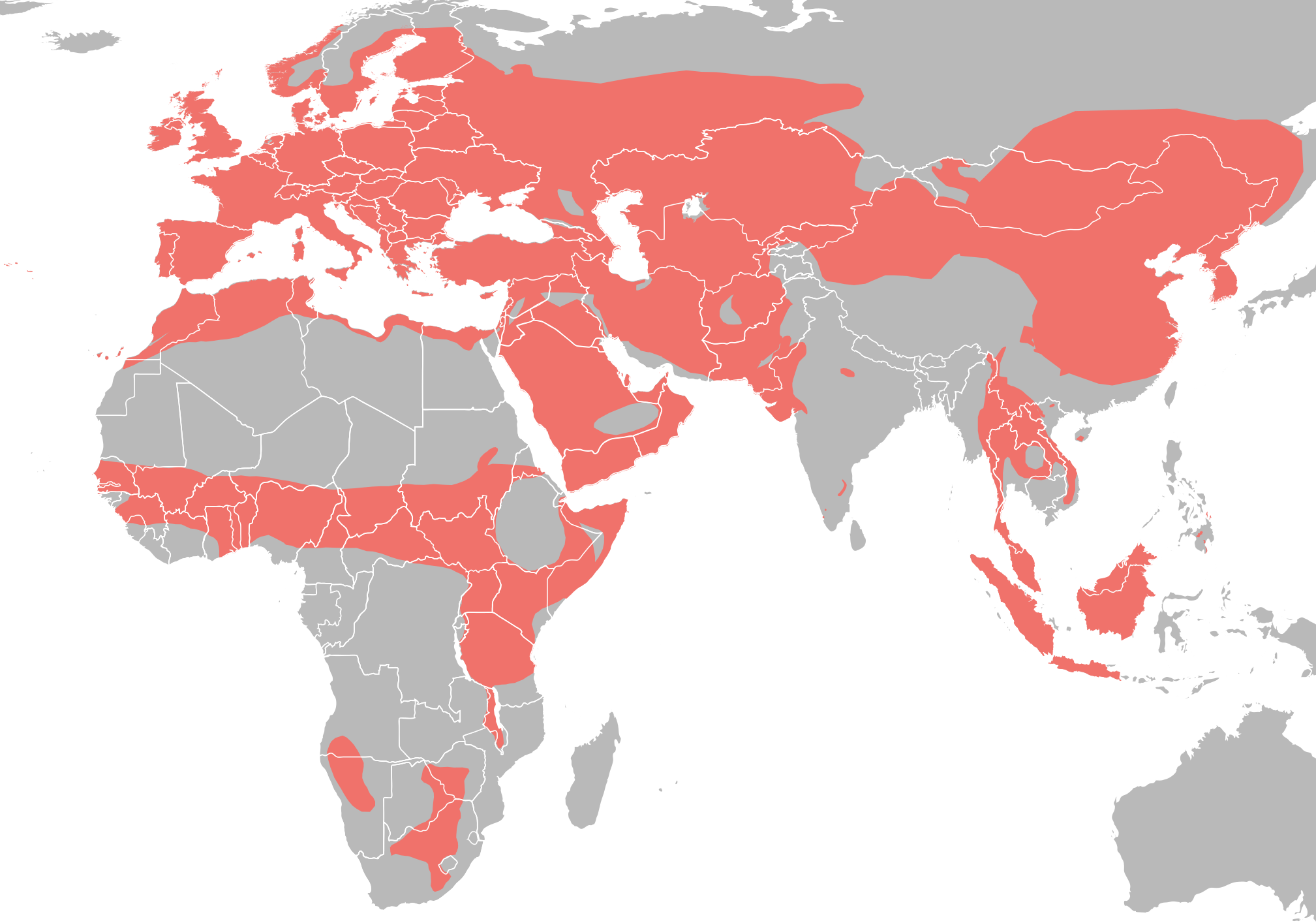
- Erinaceidae distribution

= Erinaceidae =

Erinaceidae Temporal range: Eocene–Recent

Family of mammals

Erinaceidae /ˌɛrɪnəˈsiːɪdiː/ (from Latin erinaceus, "hedgehog") is a family in the order Eulipotyphla, consisting of the hedgehogs and moonrats. Until recently, it was assigned to the order Erinaceomorpha, which has been subsumed with the paraphyletic Soricomorpha into Eulipotyphla. Eulipotyphla has been shown to be monophyletic; Soricomorpha is paraphyletic because both Soricidae and Talpidae share a more recent common ancestor with Erinaceidae than with solenodons.

Erinaceidae contains the well-known hedgehogs (subfamily Erinaceinae) of Eurasia and Africa and the gymnures or moonrats (subfamily Galericinae) of Southeast Asia. This family was once considered part of the order Insectivora, but that polyphyletic order is now considered defunct.

== Characteristics ==
Erinaceids are generally shrew-like in form, with long snouts and short tails. They are, however, much larger than shrews, ranging from 10–15 cm (4–6 in) in body length and 40–60 grams (1.4–2.1 oz) in weight, in the case of the short-tailed gymnure, up to 26–45 cm (10–18 in) and 1.0–1.4 kg (2.2–3.1 lb) in the moonrat. All but one species have five toes in each foot, in some cases with strong claws for digging, and they have large eyes and ears. Hedgehogs possess hair modified into sharp spines to form a protective covering over the upper body and flanks, while gymnures have only normal hair. Most species have anal scent glands, but these are far better developed in gymnures, which can have a powerful odor.

Erinaceids are omnivorous, with the major part of their diet consisting of insects, earthworms, and other small invertebrates. They also eat seeds and fruit, and occasionally birds' eggs, along with any carrion they come across. Their teeth are sharp and suited for impaling invertebrate prey. The dental formula for erinaceids is: 2-3.1.4.33.1.2-4.3

Hedgehogs are nocturnal, but gymnures are less so, and may be active during the day. Many species live in simple burrows, while others construct temporary nests on the surface from leaves and grass, or shelter in hollow logs or similar hiding places. Erinaceids are solitary animals outside the breeding season, and the father plays no role in raising the young.

Female erinaceids give birth after a gestation period of around six to seven weeks. The young are born blind and hairless, although hedgehogs begin to sprout their spines within 36 hours of birth.

== Evolution ==
Erinaceids are a group of placental mammals that have retained many of their ancestral traits, having changed little since their origin in the Eocene. The so-called 'giant hedgehog' (actually a gymnure) Deinogalerix, from the Miocene of Gargano Island (part of modern Italy), was the size of a large rabbit, and may have eaten vertebrate prey or carrion, rather than insects.

== Classification ==
- Order Eulipotyphla
  - †Family Amphilemuridae
    - †Genus Alsaticopithecus
    - †Genus Amphilemur
    - †Genus Gesneropithex
    - †Genus Macrocranion
      - †Macrocranion germonpreae
      - †Macrocranion junnei
      - †Macrocranion nitens
      - †Macrocranion robinsoni
      - †Macrocranion tenerum
      - †Macrocranion vandebroeki
    - †Genus Pholidocercus
      - †Pholidocercus hassiacus
  - Family Erinaceidae
    - †Genus Silvacola
      - †Silvacola acares
    - †Genus Oligoechinus
    - Subfamily Erinaceinae
      - †Genus Amphechinus
        - †Amphechinus akespensis
        - †Amphechinus arverniensis
        - †Amphechinus baudelotae
        - †Amphechinus edwardsi
        - †Amphechinus ginsburgi
        - †Amphechinus golpeae
        - †Amphechinus horncloudi
        - †Amphechinus intermedius
        - †Amphechinus kreuzae
        - †Amphechinus major
        - †Amphechinus microdus
        - †Amphechinus minutissimus
        - †Amphechinus robinsoni
        - †Amphechinus taatsiingolensis
      - Genus †Ladakhechinus
        - †Ladakhechinus iugummontis
      - Genus Atelerix
        - Four-toed hedgehog, Atelerix albiventris
        - North African hedgehog, Atelerix algirus
        - Southern African hedgehog, Atelerix frontalis
        - Somali hedgehog, Atelerix sclateri
      - Genus Erinaceus
        - Amur hedgehog, Erinaceus amurensis
        - Southern white-breasted hedgehog, Erinaceus concolor
        - European hedgehog, Erinaceus europaeus
        - Northern white-breasted hedgehog, Erinaceus roumanicus
      - Genus Hemiechinus
        - Long-eared hedgehog, Hemiechinus auritus
        - Indian long-eared hedgehog, Hemiechinus collaris
      - Genus Mesechinus
        - Daurian hedgehog, Mesechinus dauuricus
        - Hugh's hedgehog, Mesechinus hughi
        - Gaoligong forest hedgehog, Mesechinus wangi
        - Small-toothed forest hedgehog, Mesechinus miodon
      - Genus Paraechinus
        - Desert hedgehog, Paraechinus aethiopicus
        - Brandt's hedgehog, Paraechinus hypomelas
        - Indian hedgehog, Paraechinus micropus
        - Bare-bellied hedgehog, Paraechinus nudiventris
    - Subfamily Galericinae
      - †Genus Deinogalerix
        - †Deinogalerix brevirostris
        - †Deinogalerix freudenthali
        - †Deinogalerix intermedius
        - †Deinogalerix koenigswaldi
        - †Deinogalerix minor
      - Genus Echinosorex
        - Moonrat, Echinosorex gymnura
      - †Genus Galerix
        - †Galerix aurelianensis
        - †Galerix exilis
        - †Galerix kostakii
        - †Galerix remmerti
        - †Galerix rutlandae
        - †Galerix saratji
        - †Galerix stehlini
        - †Galerix symeonidisi
        - †Galerix uenayae
      - Genus Hylomys
        - Long-eared gymnure, Hylomys megalotis
        - Dwarf gymnure, Hylomys parvus
        - Javan short-tailed gymnure or Lesser Moonrat, Hylomys suillus
      - Genus Neohylomys
        - Hainan gymnure, Neonylomys hainanensis
      - Genus Neotetracus
        - Shrew gymnure, Neotetracus sinensis
      - Genus Podogymnura
        - Dinagat gymnure, Podogymnura aureospinula
        - Eastern Mindanao gymnure, Podogymnura intermedia
        - Mindanao gymnure, Podogymnura truei
