= Small-toothed forest hedgehog =

Scientific classification
- Domain: Eukaryota
- Kingdom: Animalia
- Phylum: Chordata
- Class: Mammalia
- Order: Eulipotyphla
- Family: Erinaceidae
- Genus: Mesechinus
- Species: M. miodon

Binomial name
- Mesechinus miodon (Thomas, 1908)

Species of mammal

The small-toothed forest hedgehog (Mesechinus miodon) is a species of hedgehog in the genus Mesechinus. It is native to China. For a long time it was considered a subspecies of the Daurian hedgehog or the Hugh's hedgehog. The habitat of Mesechinus miodon is dry and desert-like. They feed on various species of beetles and hibernate in late October.
