= African pygmy hedgehog =

The African pygmy hedgehog is either of two closely related hedgehogs:

- Domesticated hedgehog
- Four-toed hedgehog
