= Domesticated hedgehog =

Hedgehog kept as a pet

The domesticated hedgehog kept as a pet is typically the African pygmy hedgehog (Atelerix albiventris). Other species kept as pets include the long-eared hedgehog (Hemiechinus auritus) and the Indian long-eared hedgehog (Hemiechinus collaris).

== In the ancient era ==
Although ancient humans were familiar with the hedgehog, hunting it for food and using its spines in the processing of wool, it was not likely kept as a pet. Aristotle described the behaviour of "pet" hedgehogs kept in the home as a means for predicting weather by someone in Byzantium—Plutarch describes the same, but refers to the man as living in Cyzicus—but this is probably an unusual situation, as hedgehogs were generally not regarded as valuable animals. Other sources suggest that the Ancient Greeks may have kept hedgehogs around the home for their potential to eat beetles and other pests.

The Guinness World Records describe the Romans as having domesticated a relative of the Algerian hedgehog in the 4th century BCE, to use for meat and quills as well as pets.

The Romans did use the quill-covered hedgehog skins to clean their shawls, making them important to commerce, which resulted in the Roman Senate regulating the trade in hedgehog skins. The quills were used in the training of other animals, such as keeping a calf from suckling after it had been weaned.

== Modern domestication ==
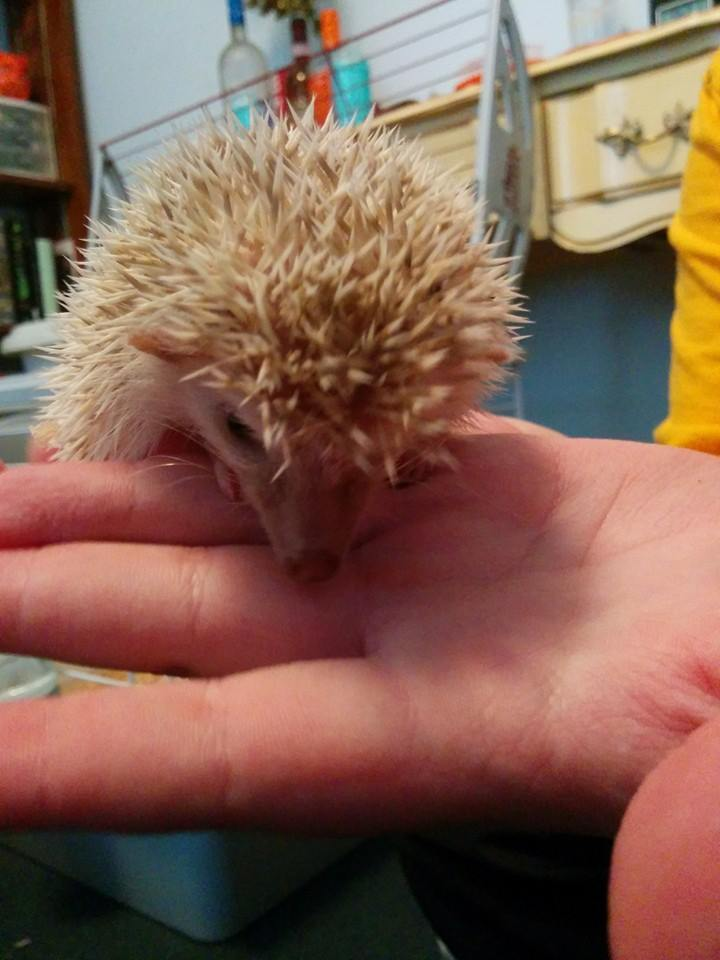
A pet hedgehog

In the early 1980s, hedgehog domestication became popular in the United States. Some U.S. states, however, ban them, or require a license to own one.

Since domestication restarted, several new colors of hedgehogs have been cultivated or became common, including albino and pinto hedgehogs. "Pinto" is a color pattern, rather than a color: A total lack of color on the quills and skin beneath, in distinct patches.

Currently, the species most common among domestic hedgehogs are African, from warm climates (above 22 °C or 72 °F). They do not hibernate in the wild, and if one of these African hedgehogs begins hibernation in response to lowered body temperature, the result can be its death. The process is easily reversed by warming, if caught within a few days of onset.

== Legality ==
Because a hedgehog is commonly kept in a cage or similar enclosure, it is allowed in some residences where cats and dogs are not allowed.

It is illegal to own a hedgehog as a pet in some jurisdictions in North America, and a license is needed to legally breed them. These restrictions may have been enacted due to the ability of some hedgehog species to carry foot and mouth disease, a highly contagious disease of cloven-hooved animals.

The European hedgehog is a protected species in all countries that have signed the Berne Convention; this includes all member states of the Council of Europe, as well as the European Union and a small number of other states. In these countries, it is illegal to capture the European hedgehog or keep it as a pet.

=== Legal status internationally ===
- Austria: European hedgehogs are protected and cannot be kept as pets. Four-toed hedgehogs (African Pygmy hedgehogs) may legally be kept as pets.
- Australia: All hedgehogs are classified as exotic pets that are illegal to import.
- Canada:
  - In Quebec – European hedgehogs are illegal. Four-toed hedgehogs are legal.
  - In Ontario – European hedgehogs are protected and cannot be kept as pets. Four-toed hedgehogs may legally be kept as pets.
- Denmark: European hedgehogs are protected and cannot be kept as pets. Four-toed hedgehogs may legally be kept as pets.
- Finland: European hedgehogs are protected and cannot be kept as pets. Four-toed hedgehogs may legally be kept as pets.
- Germany: European hedgehogs are protected and cannot be kept as pets. They may be removed from their habitat if injured or sick, but only for the purposes of restoring their health. If, for some reason, they cannot be released back into the wild (due to neurological conditions or permanent damage to limbs, for example) keeping them is still illegal and they must be put to sleep by a qualified vet. Four-toed hedgehogs may legally be kept as pets.
- Italy: European hedgehogs are protected and cannot be kept as pets. Four-toed hedgehogs may legally be kept as pets.
- Latvia: European hedgehogs are protected and cannot be kept as pets. Four-toed hedgehogs may legally be kept as pets.
- Netherlands: European hedgehogs are protected and cannot be kept as pets. Since 01-07-2024, the selling, trading, and breeding of all species of hedgehogs has become illegal.
- New Zealand: It is illegal, listed as a destructive pest, efforts to trap and eradicate are being investigated.
- Poland: European hedgehogs are protected and cannot be kept as pets. Four-toed hedgehogs may legally be kept as pets.
- France: European hedgehogs are protected; no species of hedgehog may be kept as pets.
- Spain: European hedgehogs are protected and cannot be kept as pets. Four-toed hedgehogs are illegal and considered an exotic invasive species.
- Sweden: European hedgehogs are protected and cannot be kept as pets. Four-toed hedgehogs may legally be kept as pets.
- United Kingdom: European hedgehogs are protected and cannot be kept as pets. Four-toed hedgehogs may legally be kept as pets.
- United States:
  - In Idaho and Oregon – European hedgehogs cannot be kept as pets. Four-toed hedgehogs may legally be kept as pets.
  - In New Jersey and Wyoming – a permit is required.
  - In Wisconsin – an import permit from the state department of agriculture is required to bring a hedgehog into the state.
  - In Fairfax County, Virginia, it became legal to keep hedgehogs as pets in 2019.
  - In Pennsylvania – hedgehogs may not be imported into the state, but hedgehogs in the state as of 1992 and their descendants are allowed.
  - It is currently illegal to own a hedgehog in California, Georgia, Hawaii, New York City, and Washington, D.C.
- Singapore: Hedgehogs of all kinds are illegal, along with other exotic pets such as iguanas, tarantulas, scorpions, and snakes.
- Turkey: European hedgehogs are protected and cannot be kept as pets, and four-toed hedgehogs may also not legally be kept as pets.

== Enclosures ==
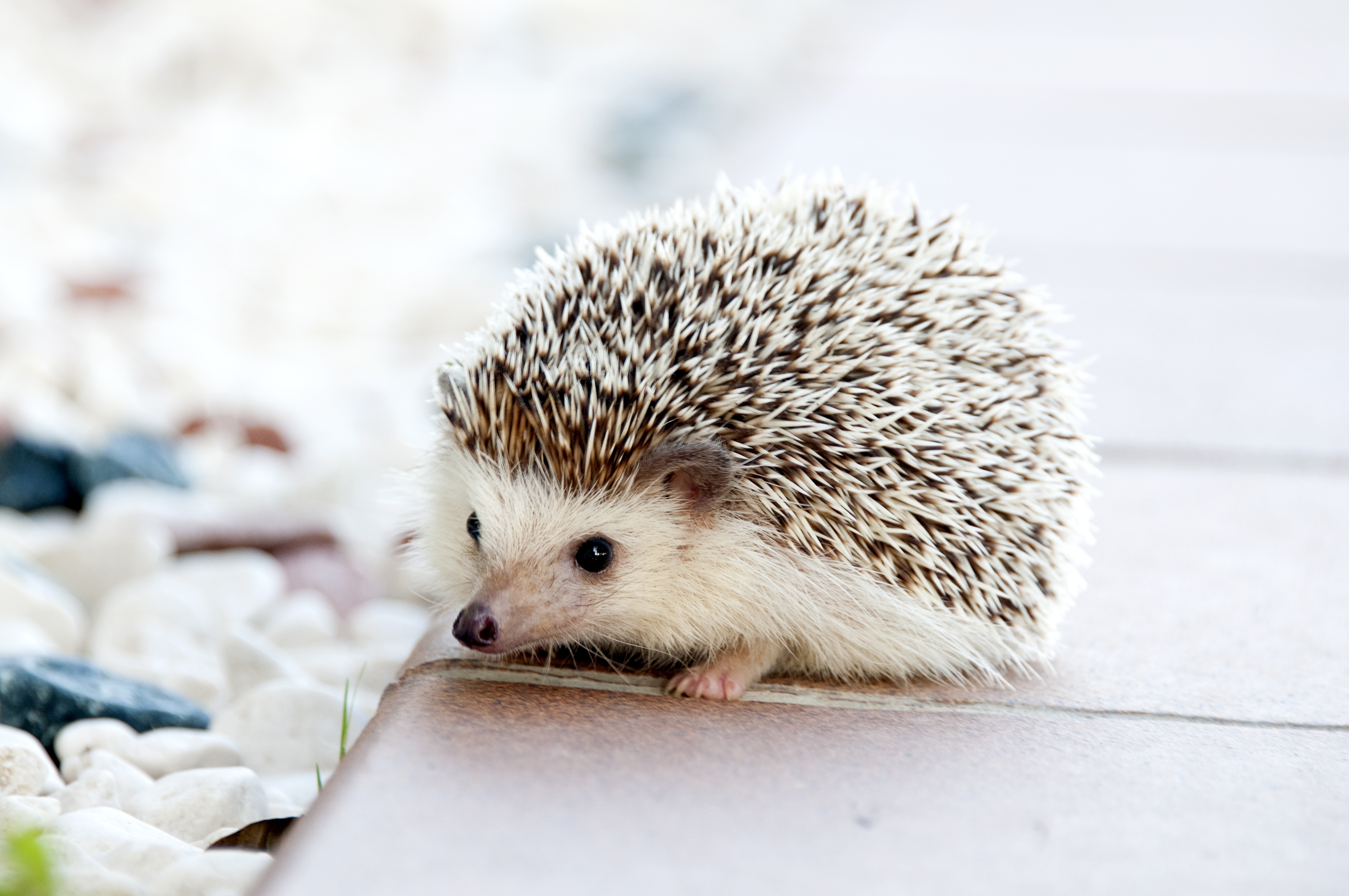
A domesticated baby hedgehog

In the wild, a hedgehog will cover many miles each night. A hedgehog with insufficient range may show signs of depression, such as excessive sleeping, refusal to eat, repetitious behaviour, and self-mutilation. Hedgehogs require a fair amount of exercise to avoid liver problems due to excess weight. Therefore, a domesticated hedgehog must have access to a running wheel. Running wheels must be selected carefully to avoid foot injury. Running wheels made of solid material that are approximately 1 foot (12 inches) in diameter are recommended.

== Food ==
In the wild, a hedgehog is opportunistic and will eat many things, but the majority of the diet comprises insects. As insectivores, hedgehogs need a diet that is high in protein and low in fat. They also require chitin, which comes from the exoskeleton of insects; fiber in the diet may be a substitute for the chitin component. There are prepared foods specifically for pet hedgehogs and insectivores, including foods made from insect components. Also available are alimentary powders to sprinkle on other food which provide chitin and other nutrients.

Pet hedgehogs may eat such table foods as cooked, lean chicken, turkey, beef or pork. They will often eat small amounts of vegetables and fruit. Hedgehogs are lactose-intolerant and will have stomach problems after consuming most dairy products, though occasional plain low-fat yogurt or cottage cheese seem to be well tolerated.

== Allergies ==
Hedgehogs produce very little danger to their owners and handlers. It is possible to be allergic to items surrounding the hedgehog, such as the hedgehog's food or bedding, but it is rare that a person would be allergic to the hedgehog itself.

After handling hedgehogs, some have claimed that pink dots on their hands is an allergic reaction. This is more likely caused by small pricks from the hedgehog's spines. If a hedgehog is not clean, the pricks can become infected. The infection is from contaminants on the hedgehog or on the surface of the hands, not from an allergic reaction to the hedgehog. As is true with most animal handling, one should wash their hands after handling a hedgehog.

Hedgehogs are commonly allergic to wood oils. Wood bedding should be avoided, specifically cedar. The oil found in cedar can cause severe upper respiratory problems. Aspen however is widely accepted as a safe substitute.

== Diseases ==
Hedgehogs can easily become obese; if they can no longer roll completely into a ball, it is a clear sign of obesity. Conversely, hedgehogs often stop eating under situations of stress, such as when adjusting to a new home.

Hedgehogs are prone to many diseases, including cancer, which spreads quickly in hedgehogs, and wobbly hedgehog syndrome (WHS), a neurological problem. Some symptoms of WHS resemble those of multiple sclerosis (MS) in humans, therefore the condition the animal experiences can be compared with what MS patients experience. A possible cause of WHS is a genetic flaw allowing a virus to attack the hedgehog's nervous system.

The nose can display a variety of symptoms of a troubled hedgehog, especially respiratory illnesses, such as pneumonia. In many cases, the form of pneumonia that affects hedgehogs is bacterial in nature. If acted upon quickly, antibiotics can have a very positive effect. Signs to watch for include bubbles, excessive dripping, or constant sneezing.

Hedgehogs usually react to stress with temporary digestive disorders that include vomiting and green feces.
