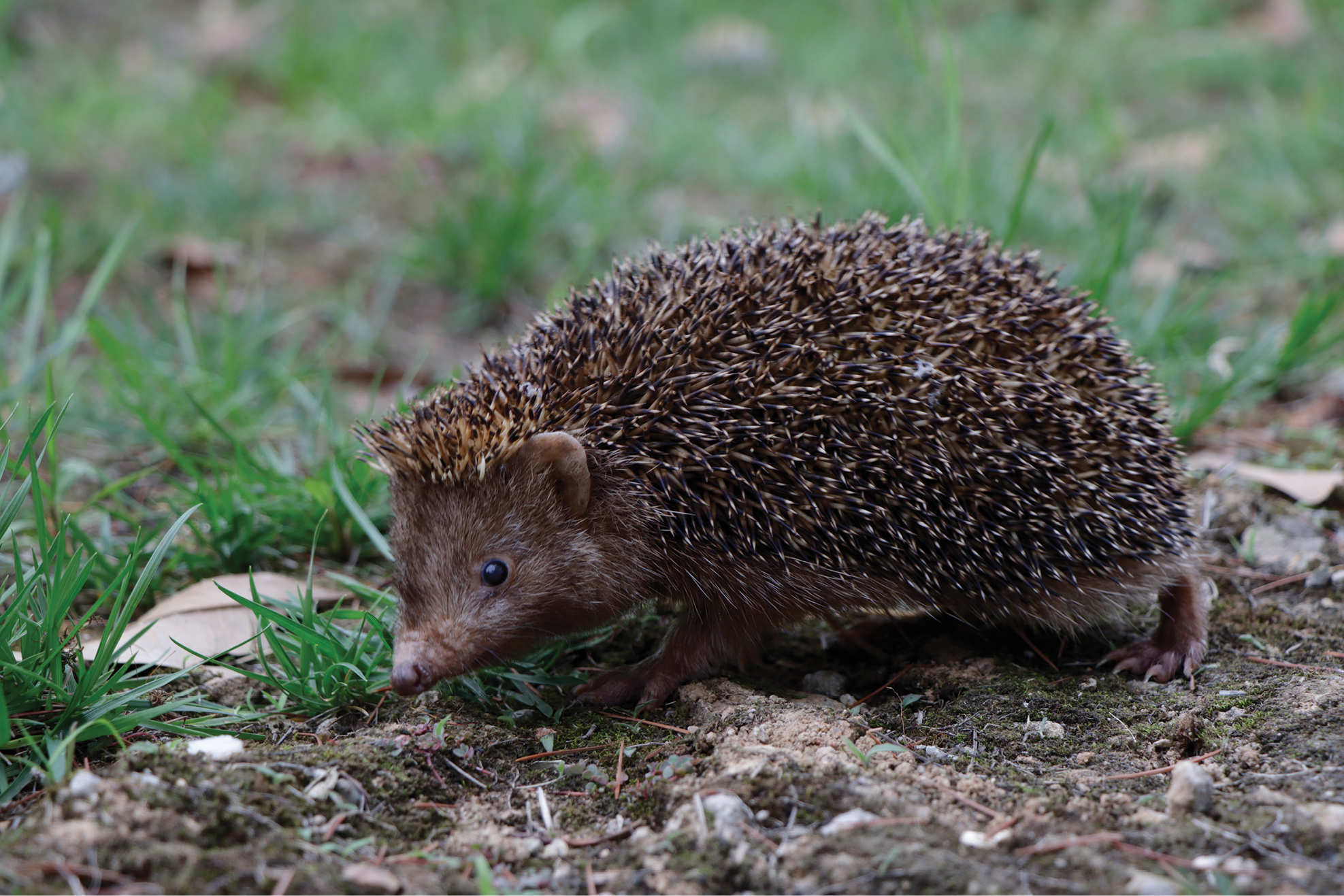

Scientific classification
- Kingdom: Animalia
- Phylum: Chordata
- Class: Mammalia
- Order: Eulipotyphla
- Family: Erinaceidae
- Genus: Mesechinus
- Species: M. orientalis

Binomial name
- Mesechinus orientalis Shi Zifan, Yao Hongfeng, He Kai, Bai Weipeng, Zhou Jiajun, Fan Jingyi, Su Weiting, Nie Wenhui, Yang Shuzhen, Onditi, Jiang Xuelong, & Chen Zhongzheng, 2023

= Eastern forest hedgehog =

Species of mammal

The eastern forest hedgehog (Mesechinus orientalis) is a species of hedgehog endemic to eastern China.

== See also ==
- List of living mammal species described in the 2020s
