= Gaoligong forest hedgehog =

Scientific classification
- Domain: Eukaryota
- Kingdom: Animalia
- Phylum: Chordata
- Class: Mammalia
- Order: Eulipotyphla
- Family: Erinaceidae
- Genus: Mesechinus
- Species: M. wangi

Binomial name
- Mesechinus wangi He, Jiang & Ai, 2018

Species of mammal

The Gaoligong forest hedgehog (Mesechinus wangi) or Wang's forest hedgehog is a species of hedgehog in the family Erinaceidae found only in China. It is endemic to the slopes of Mt. Gaoligong in the Yunnan Province, where it lives in subtropical evergreen broad-leaved forest at elevations between 2,200 and 2,680 m (7,220 and 8,790 ft). This distribution is disjunct from that of the other species in this genus.

M. wangi can be distinguished from other species in the genus by its spine color patterns, the broad nasal region, and the presence of M_{4} teeth. It hibernates between mid-October and early April. While the population size has not yet been quantified, it is likely very small as the species has only been found in the Gaoligongshan National Nature Reserve.
