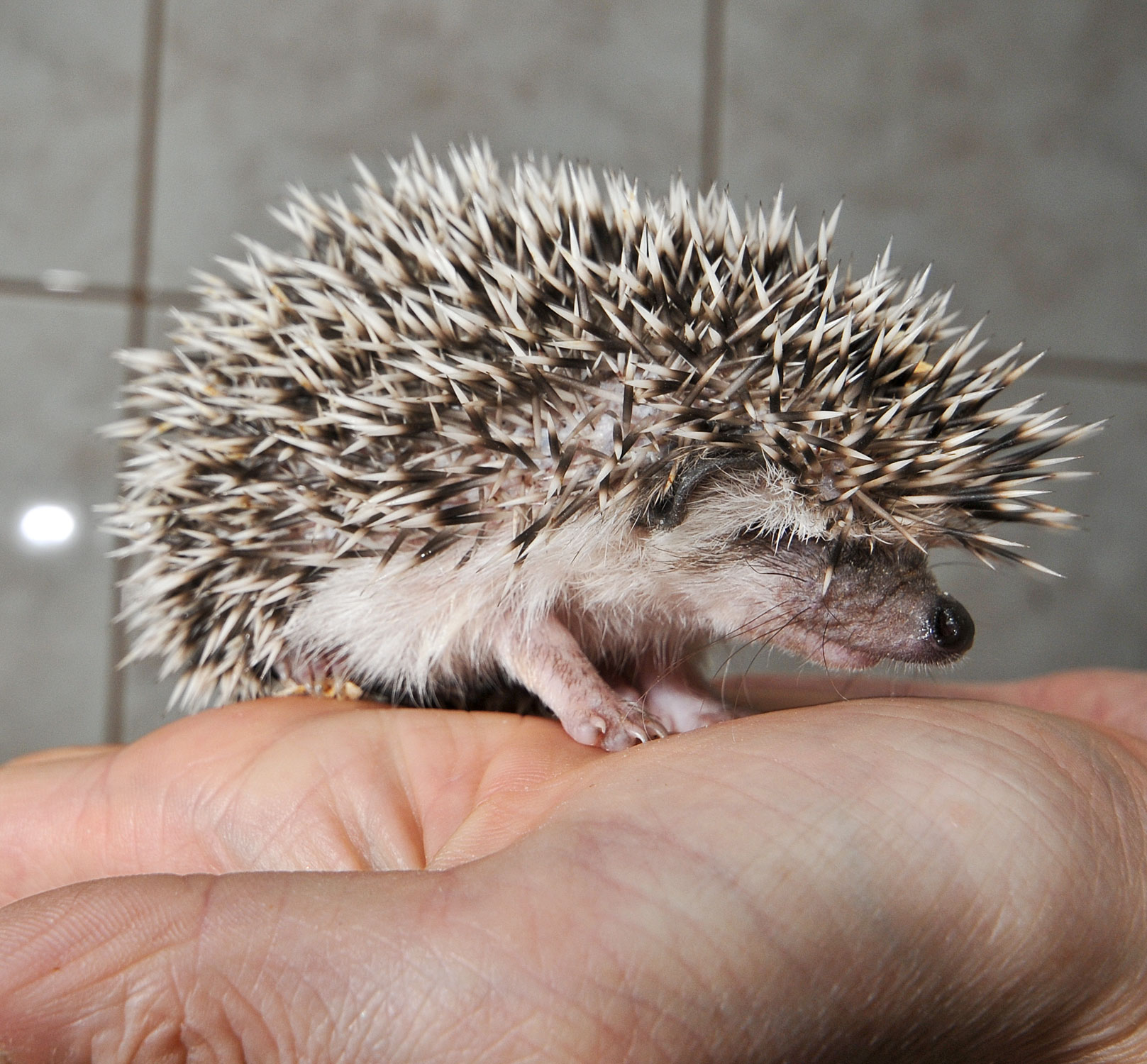
- A. albiventris

Scientific classification
- Kingdom: Animalia
- Phylum: Chordata
- Class: Mammalia
- Infraclass: Placentalia
- Order: Eulipotyphla
- Family: Erinaceidae
- Subfamily: Erinaceinae
- Genus: Atelerix; Pomel, 1848

Type species
- Erinaceus albiventris Wagner, 1841

Species
- A. albiventris A. algirus A. frontalis A. sclateri

= Atelerix =

Genus of mammals

Atelerix is a genus of hedgehog in the family Erinaceidae. It contains four species, all native to Africa.

== Species ==
Genus Atelerix – Wagner, 1841 – four species
Common name	Scientific name and subspecies	Range	Size and ecology	IUCN status and estimated population
Four-toed hedgehog	Atelerix albiventris (Wagner, 1841)	Gambia and Senegal in the west, to Somalia in the east, and also in eastern Africa, as far south as Mozambique	Size: Habitat: Diet:	LC
North African hedgehog	Atelerix algirus Lereboullet, 1842	Algeria, Libya, Malta, Morocco, Spain, and Tunisia	Size: Habitat: Diet:	LC
Southern African hedgehog	Atelerix frontalis (A. Smith, 1831)	Angola, Botswana, Lesotho, Namibia, South Africa, Tanzania and Zimbabwe.	Size: Habitat: Diet:	LC
Somali hedgehog	Atelerix sclateri Anderson, 1895	Somalia.	Size: Habitat: Diet:	LC

The Atelerix diversified from its family because of geographical isolation during Pleistocene climate changes. This being a type of vicariance separation from the Niger River. This allowed the Erinaceidane family to be more diverse.
