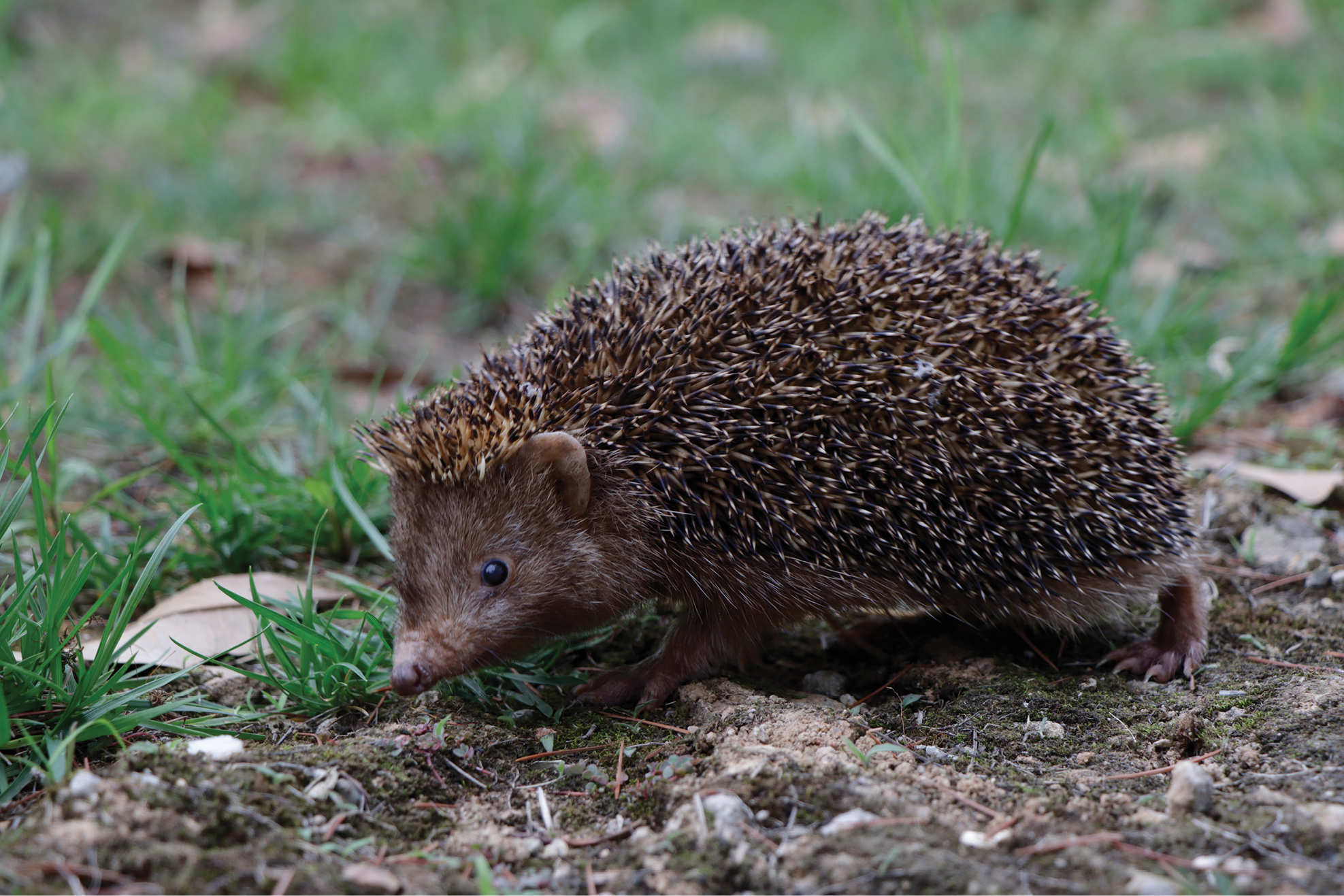
- Mesechinus orientalis

Scientific classification
- Domain: Eukaryota
- Kingdom: Animalia
- Phylum: Chordata
- Class: Mammalia
- Order: Eulipotyphla
- Family: Erinaceidae
- Subfamily: Erinaceinae
- Genus: Mesechinus; Ognev, 1951

Type species
- Erinaceus dauuricus Sundevall, 1842

Species
- M. dauuricus M. hughi M. wangii M. miodon M. orientalis

= Mesechinus =

Genus of mammals

Mesechinus is a genus of hedgehogs. It contains five species from East Asia:

- Daurian hedgehog (Mesechinus dauuricus)
- Hugh's hedgehog (Mesechinus hughi)
- Gaoligong forest hedgehog (Mesechinus wangi)
- Small-toothed forest hedgehog (Mesechinus miodon)
- Eastern forest hedgehog (Mesechinus orientalis)
