= Hedgehog Flavour Crisps =

Potato crisp brand

Hedgehog Flavour Crisps were a brand of potato crisps developed by Phillip Lewis, a British pub landlord, in 1981. They were originally sold under the brand name Hedgehog Flavoured Crisps and were produced by Hedgehog Foods. They were withdrawn from sale in 1982 when the Office of Fair Trading (OFT) alleged a breach of the Trade Descriptions Act 1968 as the product was flavoured with pork fat and herbs and contained no actual hedgehog. Lewis reached an agreement with the OFT to commission an artificial flavouring and rebrand his product as "Hedgehog Flavour Crisps". The product returned to sale in 1984 and continued to be sold until at least 1994.

== Development ==
The crisps are hedgehog flavour, but include no hedgehog

Hedgehog Flavoured Crisps were developed by Phillip Lewis, the landlord of the Vaults public house in Welshpool, Montgomeryshire, Wales, in 1981. Lewis was partly inspired by tales of hedgehogs, encased in clay, being baked on Gypsy campfires and by customers jokingly asking him for hedgehog-flavoured crisps. The crisps, sold as "Hedgehog Flavoured Crisps" did not contain any part of the European hedgehog, which is protected by the Wildlife and Countryside Act 1981, but were flavoured with pork fat and herbs. There were some complaints from animal rights supporters who mistakenly assumed that the product contained actual hedgehog.

The unusual flavouring drew attention from comedian Billy Connolly and media from across the world. The product's packet claimed that it offered the opportunity to "savour all the flavour of traditional country fare cooked the old-fashioned way without harming a single spike of a real hedgehog".

The product was manufactured by Hedgehog Foods, a company set up by Lewis on an industrial estate in Welshpool. The company developed other crisp flavours and a number of varieties of spread. By 1991, Hedgehog Foods had sales of $3.6 million and was a major donor to the hedgehog conservation charity Tiggywinkles. The company was purchased by crisp manufacturer Bensons (later known as Snackhouse). For a time, Hedgehog Flavoured Crisps were distributed in Canada; plans were in place for the product to be sold in the United States. The product is no longer available.

== Legal issues ==
In 1982, Lewis was taken to court by the Office of Fair Trading (OFT) for an alleged breach of the Trade Descriptions Act 1968 as the crisps did not actually contain any hedgehog. The product was taken off sale during the legal dispute. Lewis argued that his description was accurate as Gypsies who had visited his pub stated that they tasted similar to actual baked hedgehogs. Lewis agreed to a settlement with the OFT that he would interview Gypsies about the flavour of real baked hedgehog and then commission an artificial flavouring based on this. Lewis commissioned a flavouring from Wolverhampton Polytechnic and the OFT agreed to allow the product to return to sale on 12 January 1984, as long as the bag clearly stated that the product was artificially flavoured. As part of the agreement, the product name was changed to "Hedgehog Flavour Crisps"; this wording entailed no legal requirement for the product to contain the material specified, unlike the "flavoured" wording. The story has been wrongly cited as an example of the impact of European Economic Community food standards rules on the British market.
