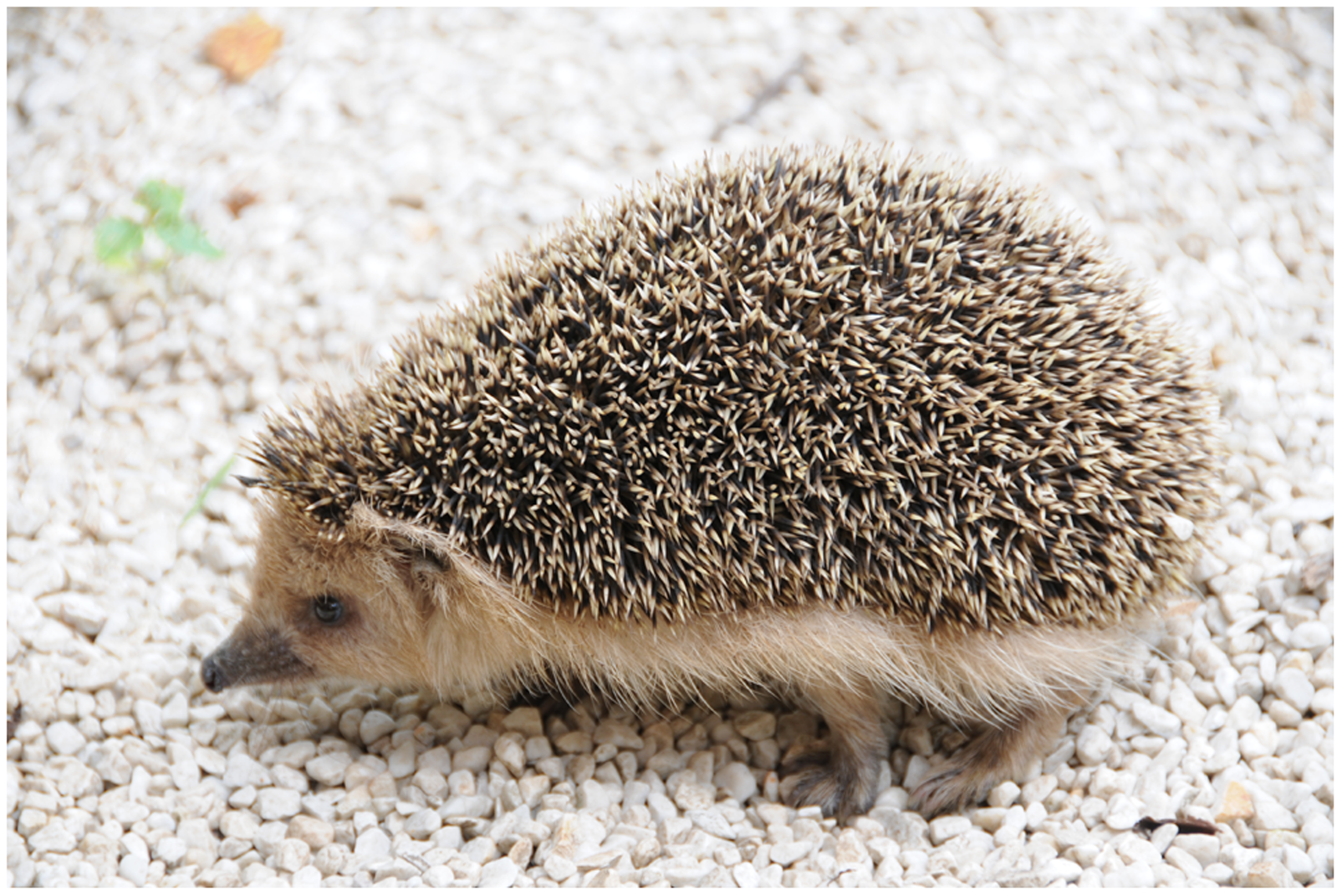

Conservation status
- Least Concern (IUCN 3.1)

Scientific classification
- Kingdom: Animalia
- Phylum: Chordata
- Class: Mammalia
- Order: Eulipotyphla
- Family: Erinaceidae
- Genus: Mesechinus
- Species: M. dauuricus

Binomial name
- Mesechinus dauuricus (Sundevall, 1842)
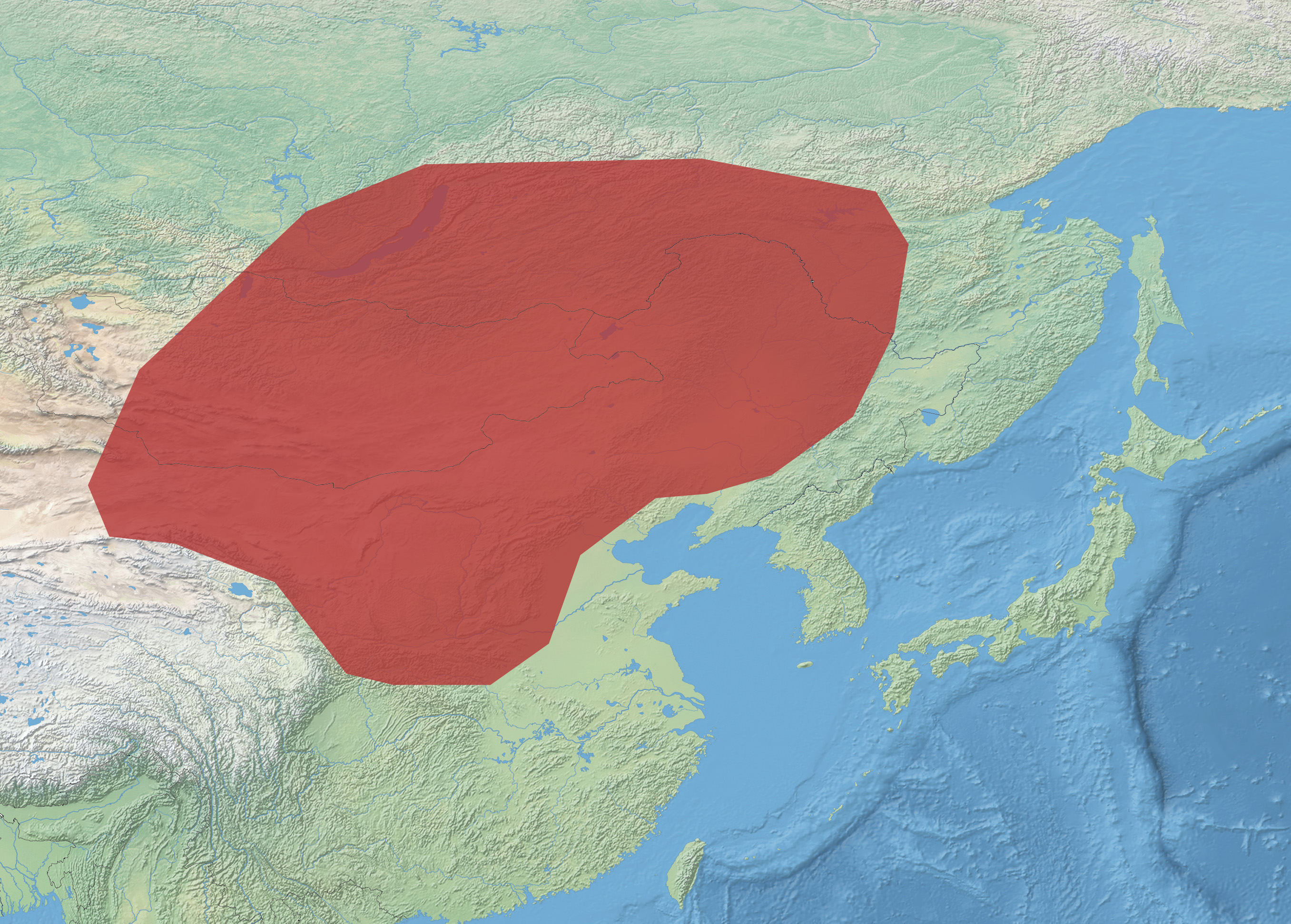
- The distribution of the Daurian hedgehog

= Daurian hedgehog =

Species of mammals

The Daurian hedgehog (Mesechinus dauuricus) is a solitary small hedgehog.

== Taxonomy ==
Mesechinus dauuricus was first described in 1842 by Carl Jakob Sundevall, as the first species of the genus Mesechinus.

== Description ==
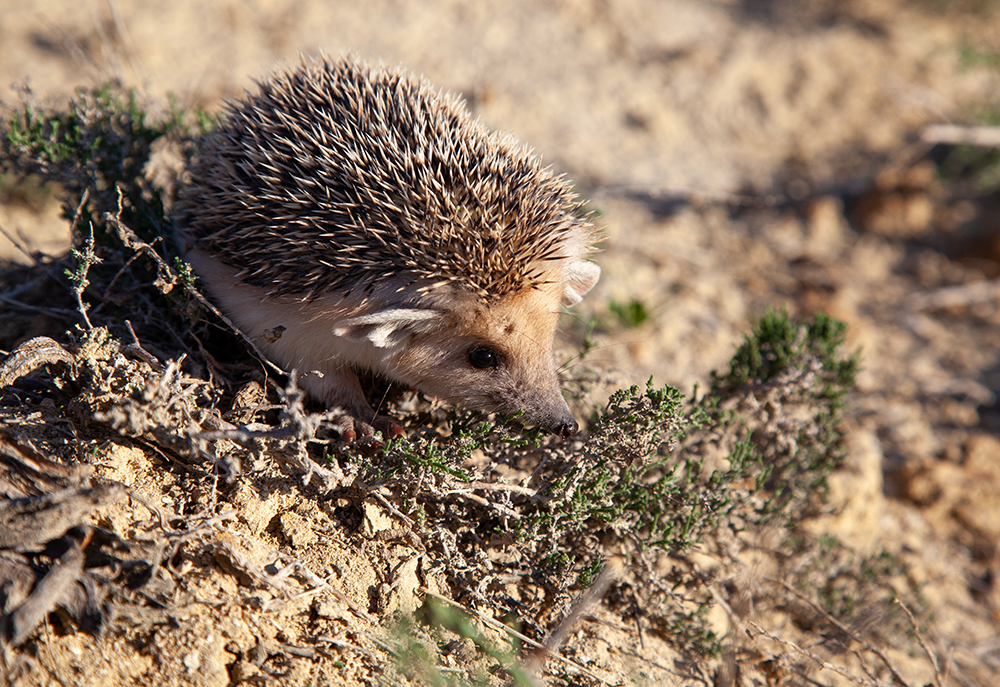
Daurian hedgehog in the Zhabayushkan sanctuary in Kazakhstan

The adult Daurian hedgehog is 15 to 20 centimeters (6 to 8 in) long and weighs up to 1 kilogram (2.2 lb), usually around 600 grams (21 oz). Most live up to six years in nature. Like most hedgehog species in temperate regions, the Daurian hibernates during the winter.

== Conservation status and range ==
The IUCN lists the Daurian hedgehog as a species of "least concern", though it is listed in the Red Book of the Russian Federation as a protected species with an unclear status, generally considered to be endangered. It populates the Transbaikal region of Russia (this region is sometimes called Dauria, hence the name) and Northern Mongolia. It lives in dens and inhabits both forests and steppes. The steppes consists mainly of grassland plains and scrublands. The Daurian hedgehog actively select scrublands and rocky areas, perhaps for greater cover and concealment from predators. This species of hedgehogs are known to occupy larger home ranges than other hedgehog species.

After introduction and extensive use of pesticides in mid-1960s, the Russian population of the Daurian hedgehog suffered a major loss. Since that time, the species seems to have had a modest recovery, although the population has not yet returned to its original size. Currently, it seems to be moving northwards and closer to cities due to more abundant food, less danger from agricultural activities and newfound human tolerance for their presence. Cases of successfully starting new populations by artificially moving several adults to new areas have been reported. Due to the low population density of the region the complete status of this species is unclear.
