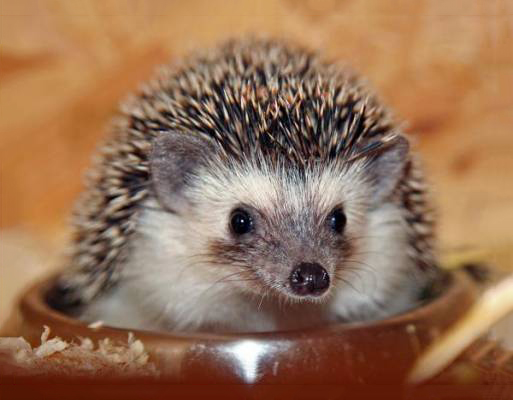

Conservation status
- Least Concern (IUCN 3.1)

Scientific classification
- Kingdom: Animalia
- Phylum: Chordata
- Class: Mammalia
- Order: Eulipotyphla
- Family: Erinaceidae
- Genus: Atelerix
- Species: A. sclateri

Binomial name
- Atelerix sclateri Anderson, 1895
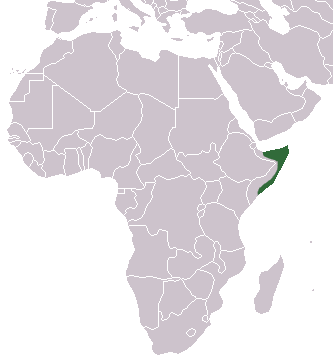
- Somali hedgehog range

= Somali hedgehog =

Species of mammal

The Somali hedgehog (Atelerix sclateri) is a species of mammal in the family Erinaceidae. It is endemic to Somalia. The Somali hedgehog is nocturnal.

== Distribution ==
The Somali hedgehog is native to areas on the outer borders of Somalia.

== Habitat ==
It is a savanna species that is believed to live mostly in grasslands and other open habitats.

== Threats ==
There is little known about this species, but from what is known there are believed to be no current threats to the hedgehog's habitat.
