= Wobbly hedgehog syndrome =

Neurological disease of hedgehogs

Wobbly hedgehog syndrome (WHS) is a progressive, degenerative, neurological disease of the African pygmy hedgehog. The cause is believed to be genetic. Nearly 10 percent of pet African pygmy hedgehogs are affected, due to their limited bloodlines.

== Symptoms and signs ==
The disease slowly degrades the hedgehog's muscle control. This first appears as a wobble while the hedgehog is attempting to stand still. Over time, the hedgehog will lose control of all muscles from the rear of its body to the front. A tentative diagnosis can be based purely on the clinical signs, but definitive diagnosis is only possible from post-mortem examination of spinal cord and brain tissues.

The hedgehog's health will deteriorate over the course of weeks or months, and in the advanced stages of this disease, they become completely immobilized, making euthanasia a recommended consideration. Most animals die within two years of diagnosis.

Symptoms usually begin in hedgehogs before they reach two years old, but can occur at any age.

== Diagnosis ==
Mainly based on symptoms and ruling out other diseases with diagnostic imaging and bloodwork.

== Treatment ==
There is no known cure for WHS, which has been compared to human multiple sclerosis. Various vitamin supplements, antibiotic and steroid treatments have been used; some appear to temporarily improve the signs or slow the progression of the disease, but as signs of WHS wax and wane, it is difficult to assess the benefit of treatments. No treatment has been shown to prevent the progression of paralysis.
