= Erinacin =

Erinacin is a antihaemorrhagic protein first isolated in 1996 from the European Hedgehog (Erinaceus europaeus), which is thought to convey (partial) immunity to snake venom.

When erinacin was processed through SDS-PAGE, it was found to contain two main types of subunits, labelled α and β, with molecular weights of 37 and 35 kDa, respectively, in a ratio of 1:2.
