= Spirura =

Scientific classification
- Domain: Eukaryota
- Kingdom: Animalia
- Phylum: Nematoda
- Class: Chromadorea
- Order: Rhabditida
- Family: Spiruridae
- Genus: Spirura; Blanchard, 1849

Genus of roundworms

Spirura is a genus of nematodes belonging to the family Spiruridae.

The genus has almost cosmopolitan distribution.

Species:

- Spirura dentata (Monnig, 1938)
- Spirura moldavica Andreiko, 1969
- Spirura rytipleurites (Deslongchamps, 1824)
- Spirura talpae (Gmelin, 1790)
