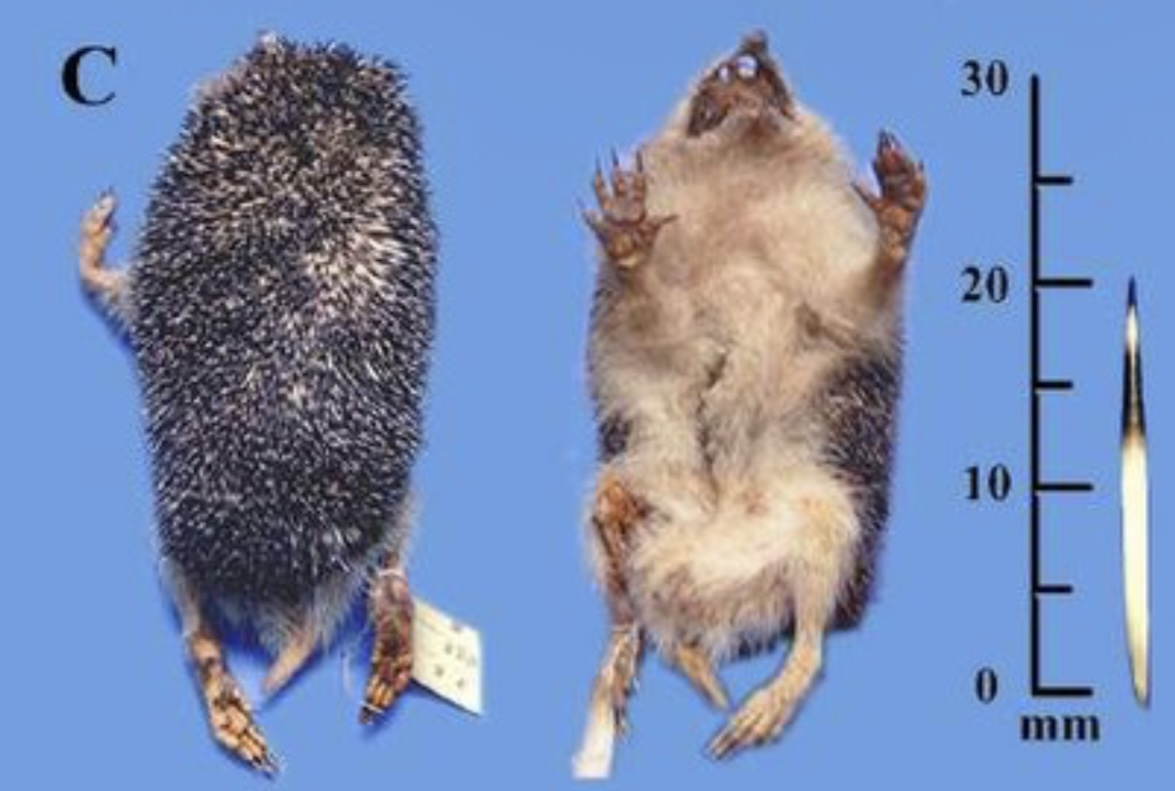
- Mesechinus Hughi taxidermied specimen

Conservation status
- Least Concern (IUCN 3.1)

Scientific classification
- Kingdom: Animalia
- Phylum: Chordata
- Class: Mammalia
- Infraclass: Placentalia
- Order: Eulipotyphla
- Family: Erinaceidae
- Genus: Mesechinus
- Species: M. hughi

Binomial name
- Mesechinus hughi (Thomas, 1908)
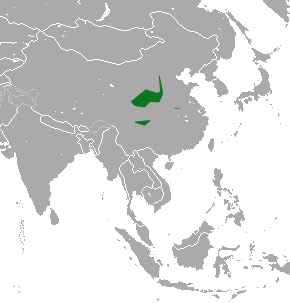
- Hugh's hedgehog range

= Hugh's hedgehog =

Species of mammal

Hugh's hedgehog (Mesechinus hughi), also sometimes referred to as the central Chinese hedgehog, is native to central China and Manchuria. It prefers open areas of dry steppe, but can be found in shrubland and forests. It is known to look for food even in daytime on rainy days.
