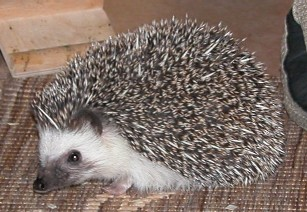

Conservation status
- Least Concern (IUCN 3.1)

Scientific classification
- Kingdom: Animalia
- Phylum: Chordata
- Class: Mammalia
- Order: Eulipotyphla
- Family: Erinaceidae
- Genus: Atelerix
- Species: A. albiventris

Binomial name
- Atelerix albiventris (Wagner, 1841)
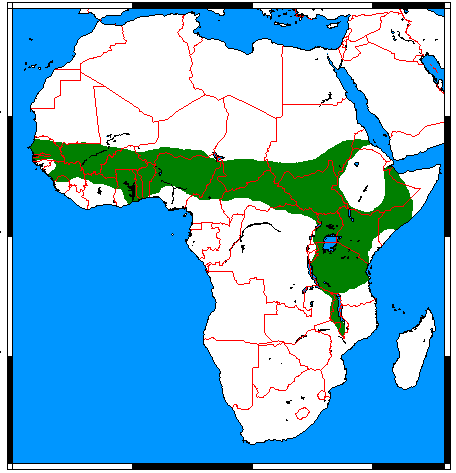
- Range of A. albiventris

= Four-toed hedgehog =

Species of mammal

The four-toed hedgehog (Atelerix albiventris), also known as the African pygmy hedgehog, is a species of hedgehog found throughout much of central and eastern Africa.

Populations tend to be scattered between suitable savannah or cropland habitats, avoiding forested areas. The species common name is derived from the number of toes found on its hind feet. Due to its extensive range and stable wild population, the species is rated as least concern by the IUCN. In addition, the species is a popular small pet in various countries, and has been successfully domesticated and bred in captivity.

There are no universally agreed subspecies of A. albiventris.

== Description ==
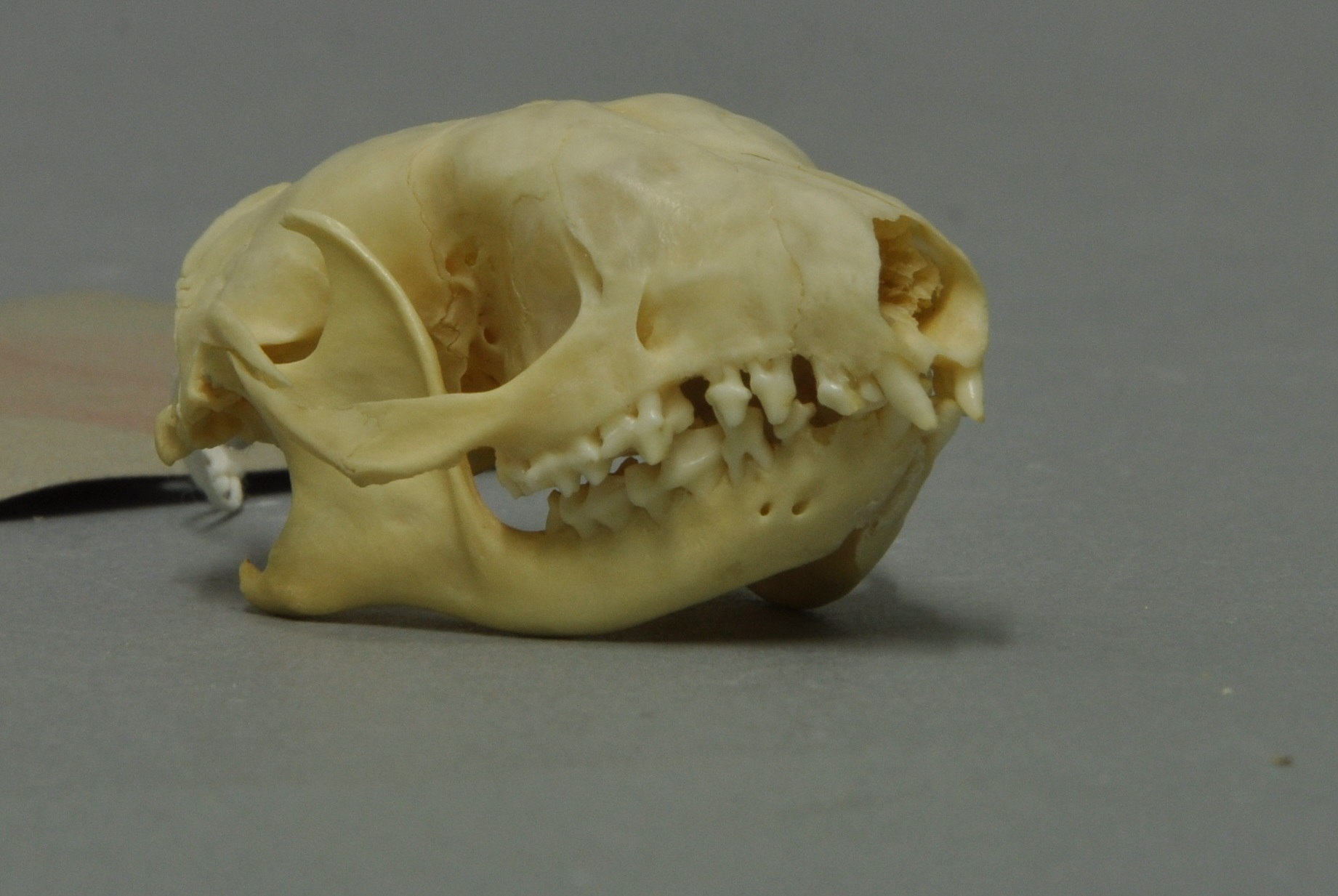
Skull of a four-toed hedgehog

The four-toed hedgehog is an oval bodied animal approximately 210 millimetres (8.3 in) in length and weighing between 250 and 600 grams (8.8 and 21.2 oz). Females are typically larger than males. It has short legs, short tail typically around 2.5 centimetres (0.98 in) in length, a long nose, and small beady eyes. The ears and whiskers are both relatively large, implying that the animal has good senses. As its common name implies, and unlike related species, the four-toed hedgehog typically only has four toes on each hind foot, lacking the hallux. However, in some individuals, a small bony lump may be present in place of the hallux, or there may even be a well-developed toe, especially on the hind feet.

It can vary greatly in colouration, but typical wild specimens have brown or grey spines with white or cream colored tips. The fur on the body is speckled grey in color, with brown around the muzzle, and white face, legs, and underparts. The upper body is covered in spines varying from 0.5 to 1.7 centimetres (0.20 to 0.67 in) in length, being longest on the upper surface of the head. The spines are variably colored, but always have a white base and tip.

Males have an externally visible penis, located in the mid-abdomen, but the testicles are recessed into pouches close to the anus. Females may have anything from two to five pairs of teats.

== Distribution and habitat ==
The four-toed hedgehog is found across a wide swathe of central Africa, from Gambia and Senegal in the west, to Somalia in the east, and also in eastern Africa, as far south as Mozambique. It prefers grassy environments or open woodland, and is found at elevations as high as 2,000 metres (6,600 ft), although it is more common in lowland areas. Because it prefers to shelter in dry rocky or grassy areas, it avoids dense forest and swampland.

The main predators of four-toed hedgehogs within their natural habitat are Verreaux's eagle-owl, jackals, hyenas, and honey badgers.

This species tends to prefer temperatures between 24 and 30 °C (75 and 86 °F). When it is hotter than that, it tends to find shelter in a burrow and go into a state of estivation, or when it is colder it goes into a state of hibernation in order to conserve energy.

== Behaviour ==
The four-toed hedgehog is a solitary, nocturnal animal. It generally moves along the ground, but is capable of both climbing and swimming when the need arises. It is highly energetic, sometimes covering miles of ground in a single night as it forages for insects, grubs, snails, spiders, some plant matter, and even small vertebrates. It has a high tolerance for toxins and has been recorded consuming scorpions and even venomous snakes.

The most common sounds made by four-toed hedgehogs are snorts, hisses, and a quiet twittering sound. When attacked, the animal can scream loudly, and males also produce a birdlike call during courtship.

Although four-toed hedgehogs do aestivate through the summer, this is not thought to be connected to a rise in temperature, but rather to a lack of available food. Aestivation rarely lasts for more than six weeks.

When encountering a predator, its standard defensive reaction is to tense up all the muscles on its back to cause its spines to stand erect, and then roll into a ball protecting its limbs and head. If it is harassed further, it will twitch in an attempt to jab spines into the predator and make snuffling/grunting noises. Its spines are not released into the skin of an attacker, as those of a porcupine. Hedgehogs only rarely lose quills during adulthood; heavy quill loss is usually a warning sign as to the animal's health.

When the four-toed hedgehog is introduced to a new or particularly strong smell, it will sometimes do what is referred to as self-anointing. It creates a large amount of foam by combining the aromatic substance with its saliva, and spreads it onto its spines. The purpose of this behavior is poorly understood, but it is thought to be a defensive action, as hedgehogs have been known to self-anoint with poisonous toads.

== Reproduction ==
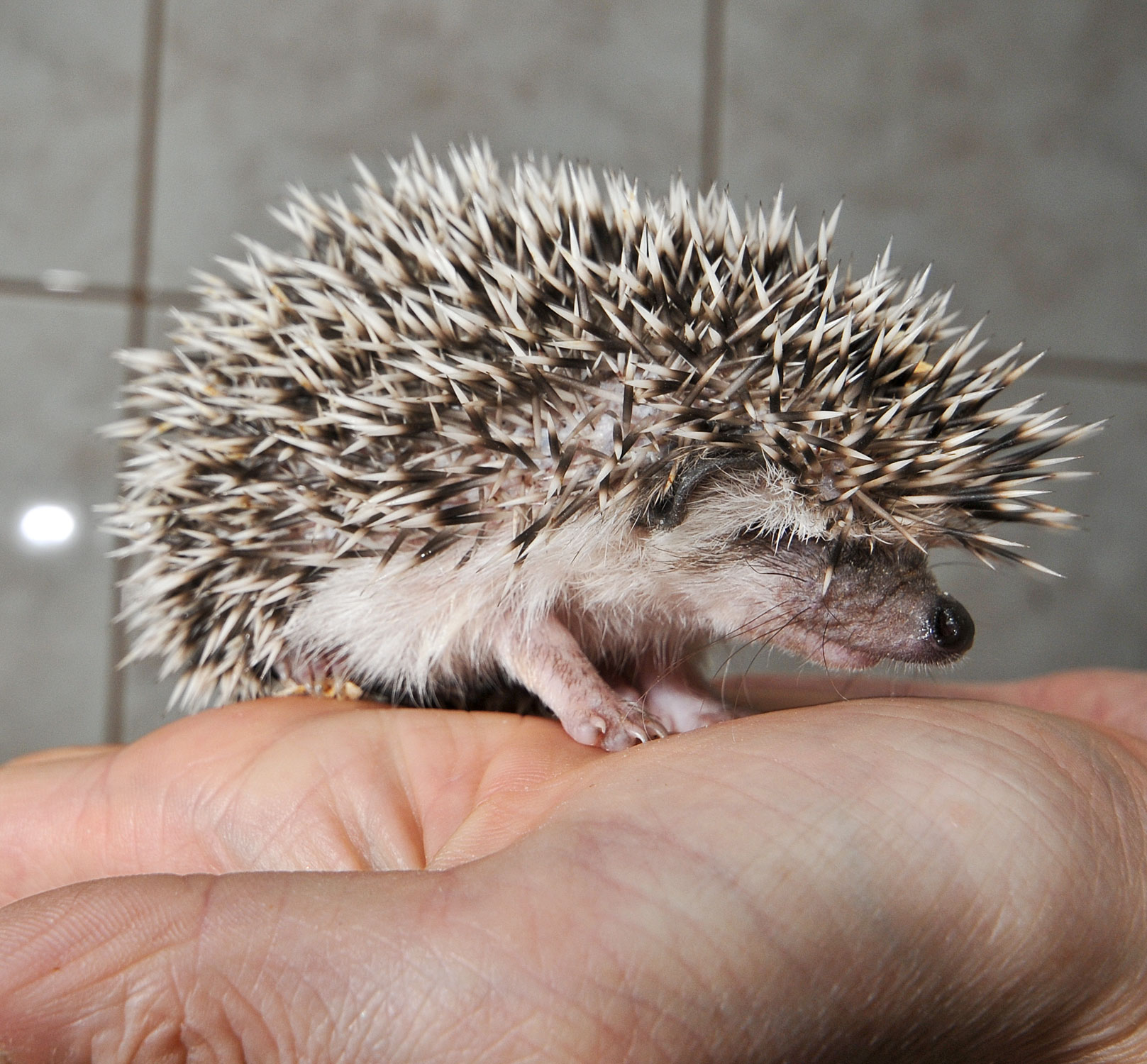
Young four-toed hedgehog

Female four-toed hedgehogs do not go into estrus during any particular season, and are fertile throughout the year, although mating is most common during the rainy season, when food is most abundant. The female typically gives birth to a single litter each year, which may contain from two to ten hoglets, with four or five being most typical. Males approach the female and court her with high pitched vocalizations. Ovulation is induced, occurring only in the presence of a male, normally within 24 hours of mating.

Gestation lasts thirty to forty days, and the mother gives birth in a well-lined nest cavity, such as an abandoned rodent burrow. The young are covered in a thin membrane to protect the mother from their already present spines, though it takes them some time to gain control over the muscles that move them. At birth, the young weigh about 10 grams (0.35 oz), and are blind and helpless, with only soft spines and no other fur. The spines stiffen within a few hours, and further spines emerge over the first few days of life as the skin, initially swollen and edematous, begins to dry and contract.

The eyes open at fifteen days, when the young begin to become more active. The deciduous teeth appear at about three weeks, with the permanent teeth following at seven to nine weeks. The young are weaned by six weeks and leave the mother not long after. They can become sexually mature at two to three months of age, although in the wild they will not typically breed during the first year of life.

In the wild, four-toed hedgehogs live for no more than about three years, but they have lived up to ten years in captivity.

== In captivity ==
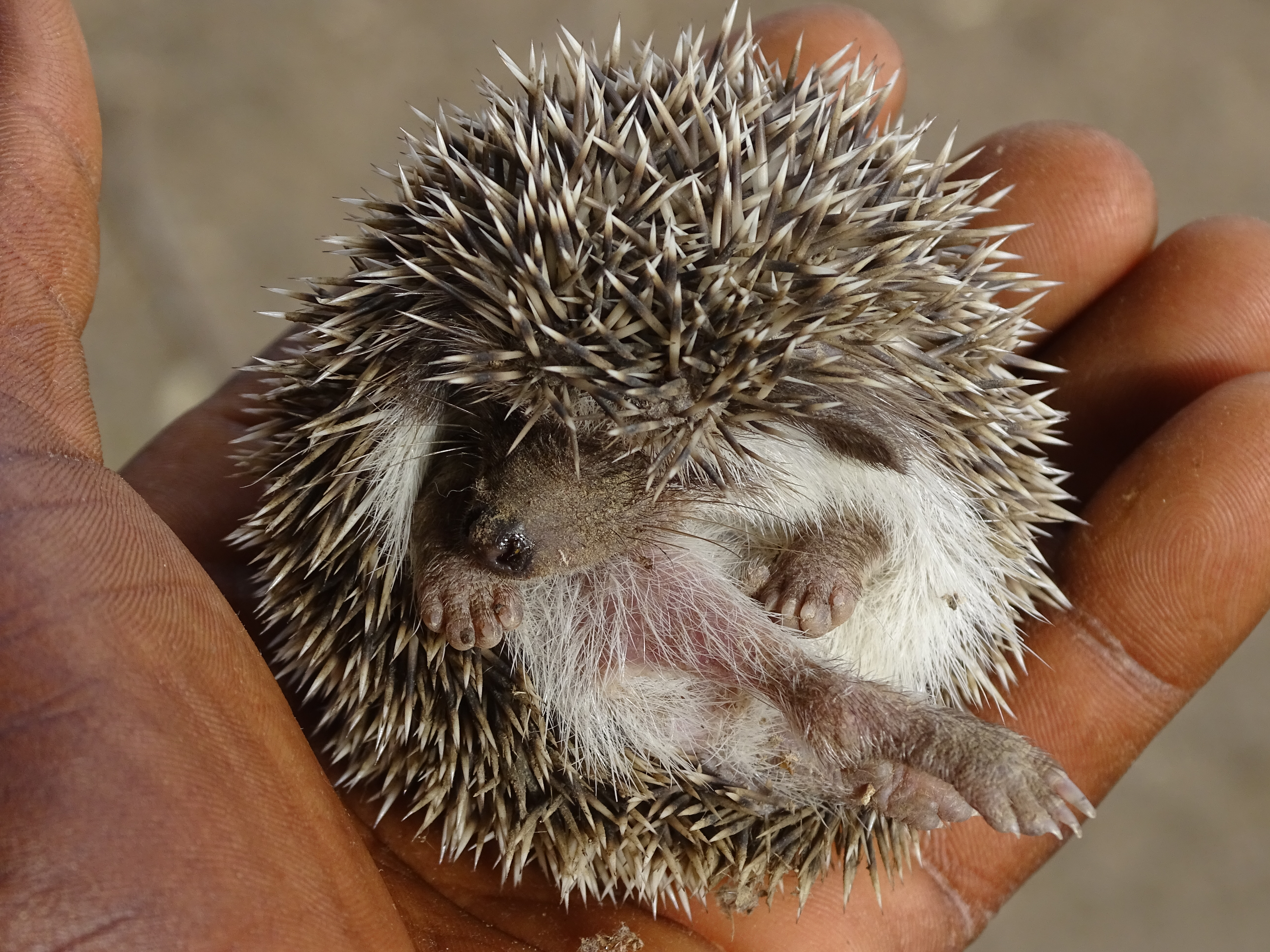
A four-toed hedgehog curled up in defense

The four-toed hedgehog is one of the most popular species of domesticated hedgehog sold in the exotic pet trade. It is bred extensively for color and temperament and is even displayed in competitive hedgehog shows. Lifespan is typically 4–6 years. Due to its energetic nature, many owners provide their hedgehog with a large running wheel. Some measure the distances their pets run every night, and some have claimed that their hedgehogs run upwards of 8 kilometres (5.0 mi) a night with speed bursts in excess of 16 kilometres per hour (9.9 mph). When kept in captivity, at more regulated temperatures, this species does not typically display its aestivation or hibernation behaviour. Due to the large amount of breeding stock available in captive collections, the four-toed hedgehog is rarely imported from the wild any longer. Several US and Canadian localities ban ownership of this species, or require special permits for them. These restrictions may have been enacted due to the ability of some hedgehog species to carry foot and mouth disease, a highly contagious disease of cloven-hooved animals. Hedgehogs are generally hardy animals when kept properly, though they may be vulnerable to the growth of tumors as they mature.
