= White-breasted hedgehog =

White-breasted hedgehog may refer to:

- Northern white-breasted hedgehog (Erinaceus roumanicus), a hedgehog domestic between Eastern Europe and Western Siberian
- Southern white-breasted hedgehog (Erinaceus concolor), a hedgehog of Western Asia
