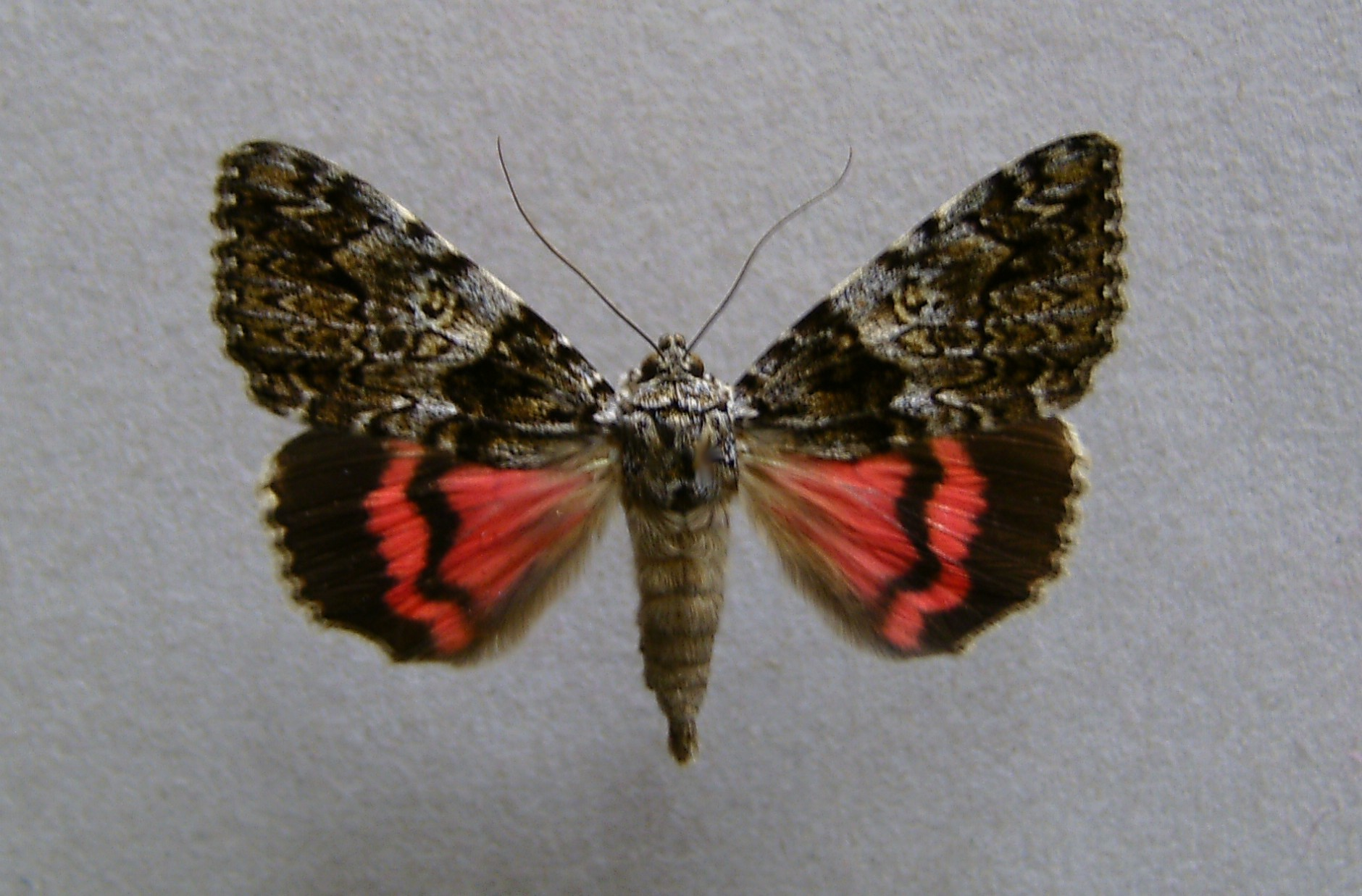

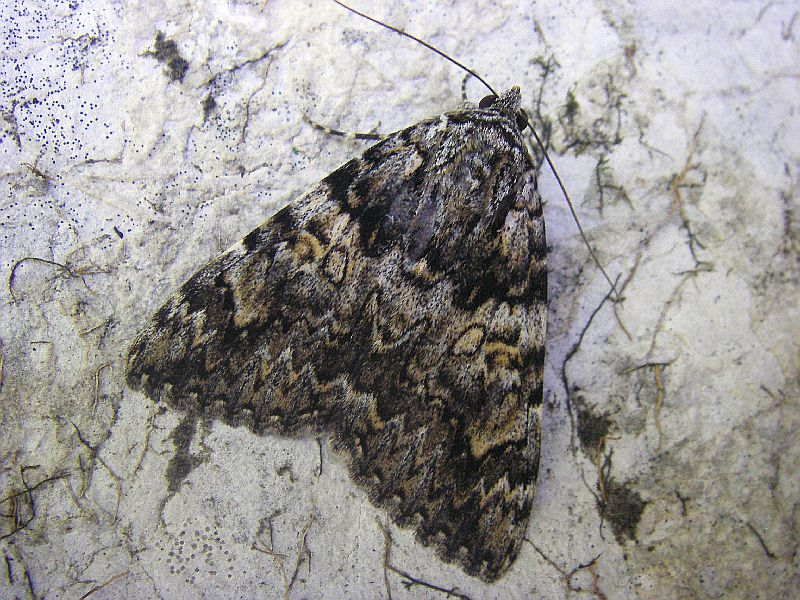

Scientific classification
- Kingdom: Animalia
- Phylum: Arthropoda
- Class: Insecta
- Order: Lepidoptera
- Superfamily: Noctuoidea
- Family: Erebidae
- Genus: Catocala
- Species: C. promissa

Binomial name
- Catocala promissa (Denis & Schiffermüller, 1775)

Synonyms
- Noctua promissa [Schiffermüller], 1775; Noctua mneste Hübner, [1813]; Catocala electra A. Bang-Haas, 1910; Catocala promissa var. hilaris Oberthür, 1907; Catocala promissa var. ochracea Oberthür, 1907

= Catocala promissa =

Species of moth

Catocala promissa, the light crimson underwing, is a moth of the family Erebidae. The species was first described by Michael Denis and Ignaz Schiffermüller in 1775. It can be found in Europe and Anatolia up to Armenia.

== Technical description and variation ==
C. promissa Esp. (= mneste Hbn.). Smaller than sponsa; forewing with the ground colour white dusted with pale and dark grey; the costal edge between the lines white; the basal line and streak from base below cell black; the inner line double, black, forming a bluntly rounded projection in submedian interval, generally accompanied by a diffuse black shade forming a band; space between outer and subterminal lines filled in with dark; subterminal line pale grey, zigzag, externally black-edged; median space generally paler grey, especially on costa before reniform and before outer line; reniform with blackish centre and pale grey ring, placed in a diffuse dark median shade, the spot below it generally pale grey distinctly outlined with black; hindwing crimson with broad black terminal border and narrow sinuous median band, not reaching inner margin; the sinuosity of the band varies much, appearing to be greatest in British and Hungarian examples; instances where the band actually reaches inner margin are very rare and confined to dark-suffused females; — ab. ochracea Oberth., from Valais and Silesia, has the hindwing pale yellow ochreous in place of red; — ab. rosea Tutt has the dorsum red like the hindwings, as recorded by Guenee; in the ab. obsoleta Schultz the black bands of the hindwing, instead of being concisely marked, as usual, are diffusely edged and run into the red ground colour, giving the whole wing a dark appearance. Larva bluish grey or greenish grey, with irregularly shaped black marks on the dorsum and sides, varying in intensity; tubercles fine, white; hump on segment 9 surrounded by black, white in middle; that on segment 12 bearing two strong points; head yellow with black marks; venter with a row of black spots; the lateral filamentary processes very strongly developed. The wingspan is 60–65 mm.

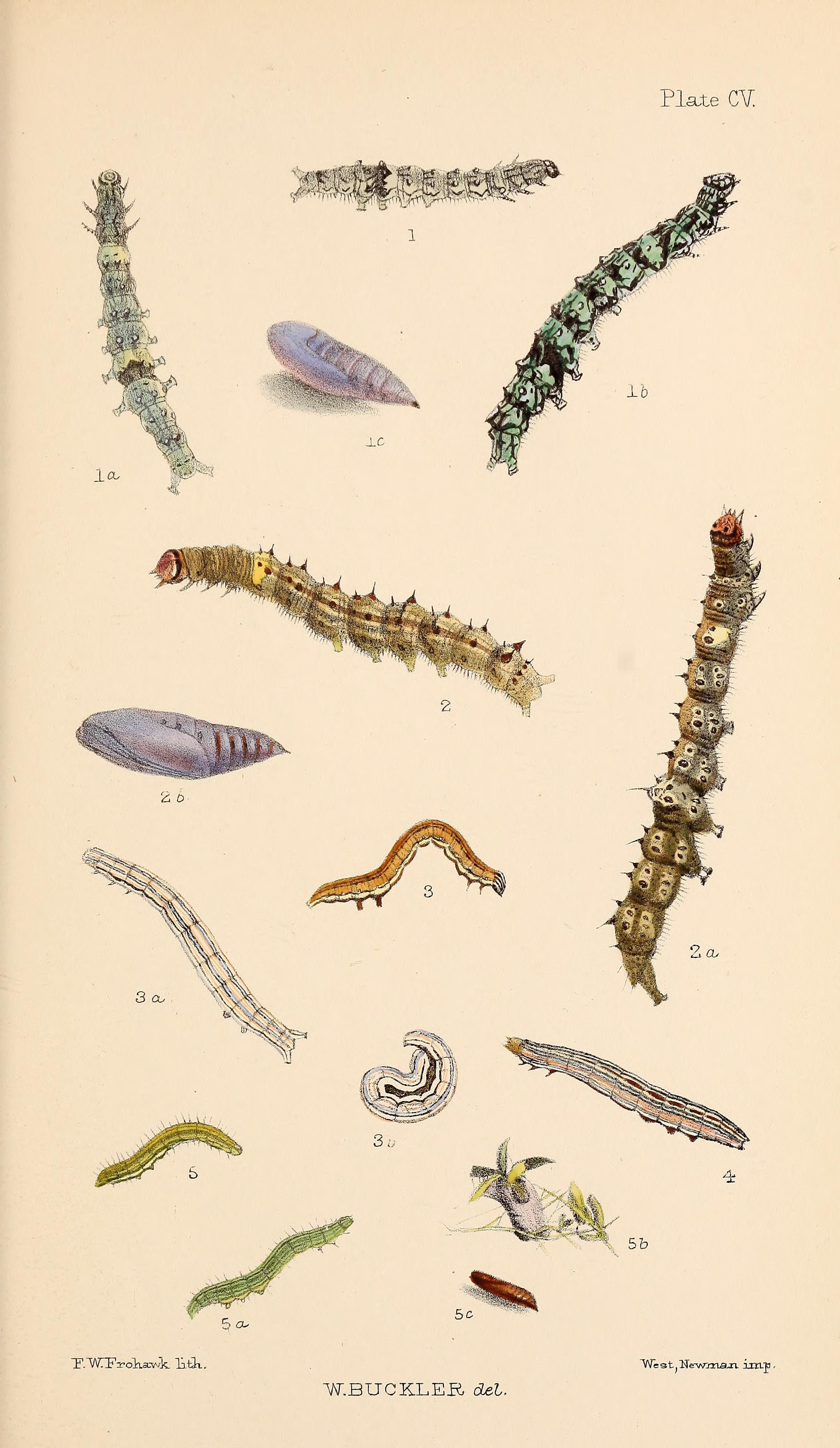
Figs. 1 young larva 1a, 1b larvae after last moult 1c pupa

== Biology ==
The moths flies from July to August depending on the location. The larvae feed on oaks.
