= Briddlesford Nature Reserve =

Nature reserve on the Isle of Wight, England

Coordinates: 50.714°N 1.229°W

Briddlesford Nature Reserve (or Briddlesford Woods Nature Reserve) consists of 158 hectares (~390 acres) of land on the Isle of Wight that is composed of a complex of different habitats, including woodland, arable farmland, lowland meadow, parkland, pond, hedgerow and grazing marsh. The reserve encompasses a majority of the Briddlesford Copses Site of Special Scientific Interest (SSSI) and Special Area of Conservation (SAC) together with about 50 hectares (~124 acres) of farmland. The reserve is owned by People's Trust for Endangered Species (PTES) and managed to preserve and enhance its biodiversity value.

== Flora ==
=== Woodland flora ===
A vegetation survey of the woodland complex was undertaken in 2007 and concluded that: "The woodland complex has a superb representation of the range of communities making up the lowland mixed Atlantic bluebell woods. Floristically this survey demonstrated the woodland flora is among the richest in England for woodland vascular plants."

A total of 65 Ancient Woodland Indicator plants have been recorded in the woods.

Of special note is the population of narrow-leaved lungwort (Pulmonaria longifolia). This nationally scarce species is the rarest known vascular plant on the reserve and in Britain is limited to ancient woodlands on the shores and tributaries of the Solent. Other locally distributed ancient woodland specialities include green hellebore (Helleborus viridis), greater butterfly orchid (Platanthera chlorantha) and thin spiked wood sedge (Carex strigosa).

== Fauna ==
=== Mammals ===
Briddlesford Copses—the woodland areas that make up the majority of the woodland in the reserve—were designated a SAC in 1995 in recognition of the internationally important breeding population of Bechstein's bats that are resident there. The rare barbastelle bat also breeds in the woods, contributing to a total of eight bat species recorded at the site. These animals are particularly associated with woodpecker holes and crevices in mature ash trees at this site. The woods support both hazel dormice and red squirrels, and alongside the bats form a mammal assemblage that is unique to the UK. The dormice have been monitored in the woodland since at least 1996. Over 530 nest boxes are arranged in two grids that contribute data to the National Dormouse Monitoring Programme (NDMP) and inform the management of the woodlands.

=== Invertebrates ===
The invertebrate fauna of the reserve has been surveyed in detail in 2002 and 2012, and surveyors found a rich and diverse fauna with an abundance of ancient woodland associated species. A total of 650 species have been identified and the reserve is now known to be of SSSI quality for saproxylic invertebrates (dead wood specialists). Of special interest is the rare fungus weevil Pseudeuparius sepicola, a Red Data Book species. The nationally scarce wood-cricket Nemobius sylvestris is very common in Briddlesford Copse and a population of the ash-black slug (Limax cinereoniger) was also recently discovered at the reserve - the largest terrestrial slug in the world. The rides and railway cuttings also provide a valuable habitat for a variety of woodland butterflies including silver-washed fritillary (Argynnis paphia), white admiral (Limenitis camilla) and the dark crimson underwing moth (Catocala sponsa).

== Copses ==
- Briddlesford Copse
- Little Lynn Common
- Great Lynn Common
- Gunsight
- Moor Wood
- Sheepwash
- Sandpit
- Big Wood
- Dunnage
- Stockers Hole
- Great Wood
- Six Acre
- Hurst Copse
- Vicarage

== Public access ==
There is a bridleway through the reserve and the parkland and Hurst Copse have permissive access.
