= Hedgehog Street =

UK-based conservation project

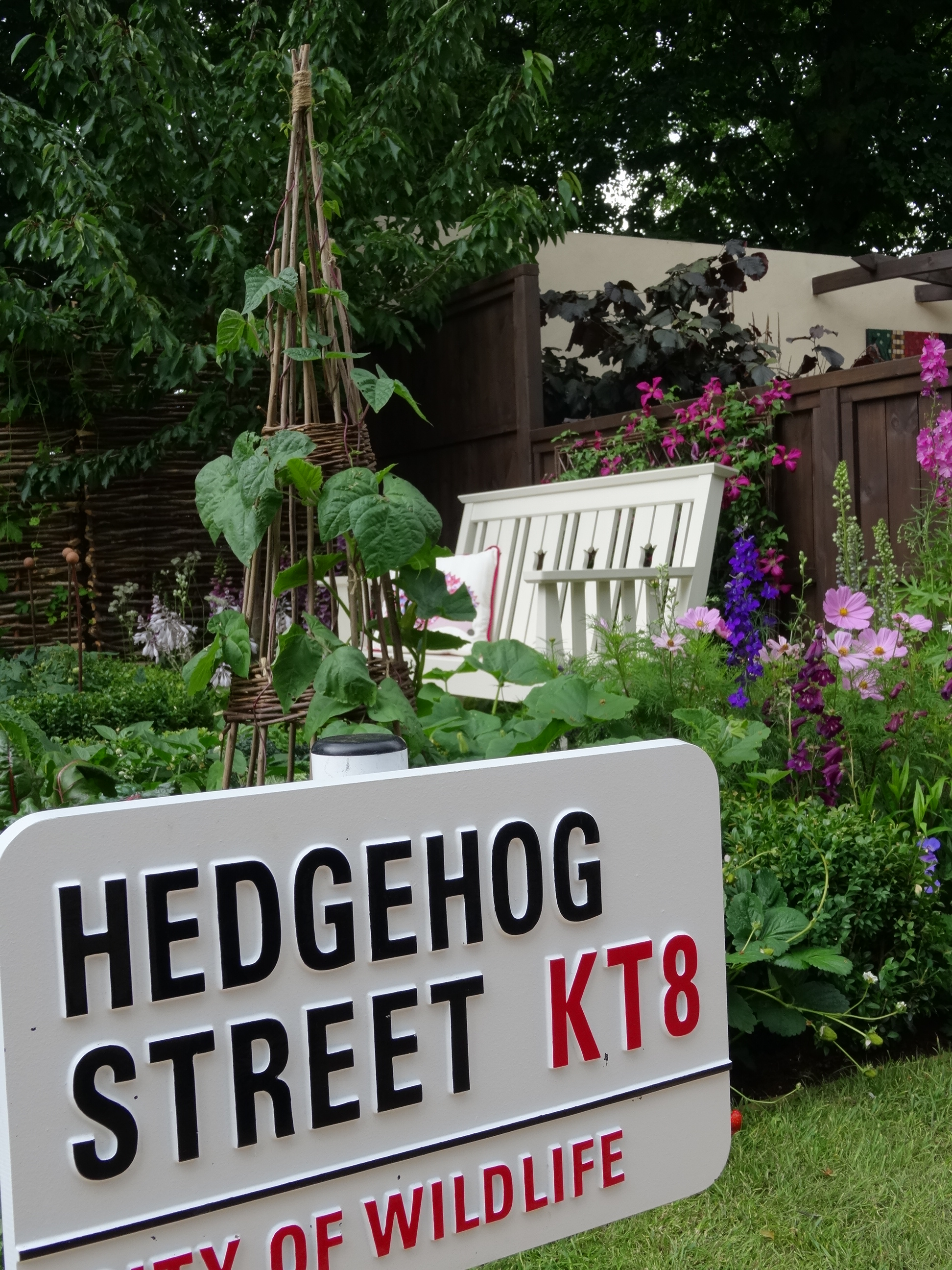
The show garden at Hampton Court Flower Show (2014). Designed by Tracy Foster, it won a gold medal and the People's Choice Award.

Hedgehog Street is a UK-based conservation initiative set up by two charitable organisations, People's Trust for Endangered Species (PTES) and the British Hedgehog Preservation Society (BHPS). The project was established in 2011 in response to a detected decline in hedgehog (Erinaceus europaeus) populations in Britain, where it is a native species.

As of January 2025, over 130,000 volunteers have signed up to be ‘Hedgehog Champions’, committing to making changes in their gardens to encourage and support wild hedgehogs.

The Hedgehog Street website provides volunteers with information about the ecology and behaviour of hedgehogs, tips on ways of managing gardens to benefit them, and free resources to encourage volunteers to recruit other people to participate.

== Hedgehogs and Development ==
One of the major objectives of the campaign is to work with the public and housing developers to connect gardens and greenspaces with 'Hedgehog Highways', which are 13cm x 13cm square holes in fences/boundaries that allow hedgehogs to travel further to find food and nesting sites.

== Hampton Court Flower Show ==
In July 2014 there was a Hedgehog Street garden at the RHS Hampton Court Palace Flower Show, designed by Tracy Foster, it featured a series of three linked gardens of differing styles. It won a gold medal and the People's Choice Award for 'best small garden'.

== Hedgehog Species Champion ==
In 2017, then Secretary of State for Transport Chris Grayling MP, was appointed the Species Champion for Hedgehogs in Parliament. He remained in this role until he stepped down from his MP role in the 2024 general election. The Species Champion Project partners Members of Parliament from England with wildlife organisations to bring political support to the protection and promotion of threatened wildlife. The project is run by a group of seven organisations: Amphibian and Reptile Conservation, Bat Conservation Trust, Buglife, Bumblebee Conservation Trust, Butterfly Conservation, Plantlife and the RSPB. Additional support is provided by the Angling Trust, the People's Trust for Endangered Species, the British Hedgehog Preservation Society and Somerset Wildlife Trust.
