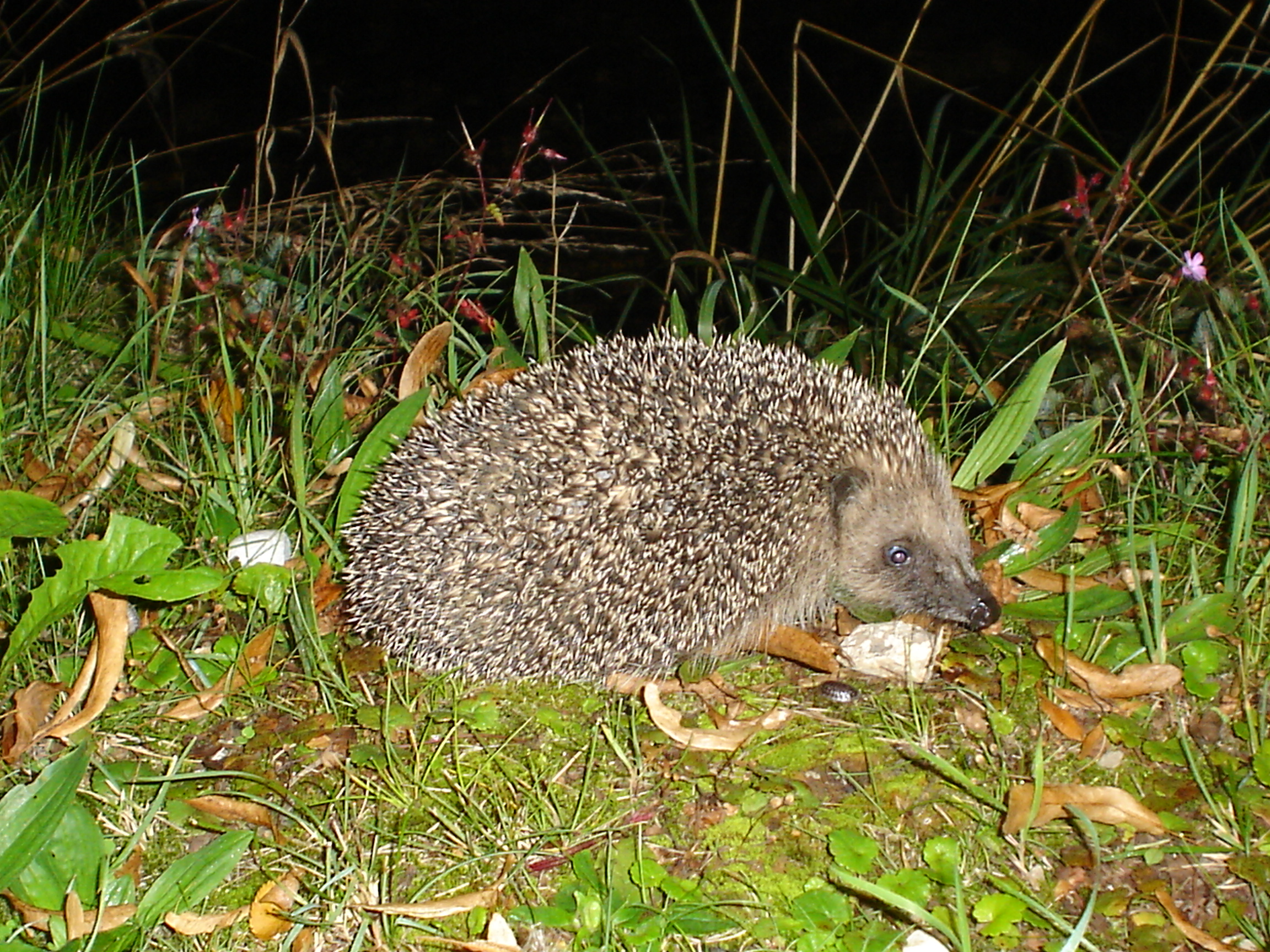
- E. europaeus

Scientific classification
- Kingdom: Animalia
- Phylum: Chordata
- Class: Mammalia
- Order: Eulipotyphla
- Family: Erinaceidae
- Subfamily: Erinaceinae
- Genus: Erinaceus; Linnaeus, 1758

Type species
- Erinaceus europaeus Linnaeus, 1758

Species
- E. amurensis E. concolor E. europaeus E. roumanicus

= Erinaceus =

Erinaceus Temporal range: Late Miocene–Recent

Genus of mammals

Erinaceus is a genus of hedgehog from the family of Erinaceidae. There are four main species of Erinaceus. The range is all across Europe, throughout the Middle East, parts of Russia, and extending to northern China and Korea. The European hedgehog (Erinaceus europaeus) has been introduced to New Zealand.

== Description ==
As is characteristic of other hedgehogs, members of Erinaceus have spines. These spines are a modification of the hair that is formed and strengthened by keratin. They contain hollow air filled gaps separated by thin inner layers of the spine to lessen the weight load. Every spine is tapered at the end to form a point and also at the base where it then forms a bulb that is attached to the skin. The tapering at the base allows the spine to have a section that will bend under stress and dampen forces placed on the spines. Each of the spines has a dermal muscle that erects the spine for defense. The size of Erinaceus is 20–30 cm with a weight of 400–1200 g.

== Behavior ==
Like all other hedgehogs Erinaceus is nocturnal and seeks shelter in shrubs and burrows during the day. The common defense mechanism is to roll into a ball with the spines facing outward. The action is done because of excess loose skin on the back of hedgehogs allows them to pull it around the rest of their body forming a ball. The first step is to pull skin fold over the head and rear of the body. Once this is done a muscle that runs along the edges of the animal called the panniculus carnosus contracts pulling everything in like a drawstring. Like most hedgehogs, Erinaceus is solitary until breeding season. Another normal action is self-anointing where the organism produces thick foamy saliva and proceeds to cover its spines with the saliva. This could be in response to a chemical signal and often is done when a new object is introduced. The reason for self-anointing is unknown and believed to be either part of a defense or attraction of a mate. Hibernation is common in each of the species for Erinaceus. Most have the ability to lower the body temperature close that of the environmental temperature. In particular Erinaceus europaeus the body temperature can drop down to 1 °C and lower its heart rate down to 22 beats per minute.

== Reproduction and lifespan ==
It is believed that Erinaceus is polygynous in mating. Once fertilized gestation is between 30 and 40 days. Upon birth the young are born blind and dependent to their mother. The average litter size is 2–5 offspring with a maximum of 10. Offspring are born without developed spines, which form within a few weeks. Weaning occurs around 4–6 weeks. Sexual maturity is reached around 12 months. The average life span is 2–5 years, while in captivity lifespan can reach as much as 10 years.

== Diet ==
Erinaceus is an omnivore. It will eat small invertebrates, small vertebrates, fruit, vegetables, and even fungi. In some cases they have been known to eat venomous snakes or even toxic beetles. Some species show resistance to snake venom up to forty times greater than that of the ordinary laboratory mouse.

== Species ==
Image	Species	Distribution
	Amur hedgehog (Erinaceus amurensis)	
	Southern white-breasted hedgehog (Erinaceus concolor)	
	European hedgehog (Erinaceus europaeus)	
	Northern white-breasted hedgehog (Erinaceus roumanicus)	
