= Briddlesford Copses =

Protected area on the Isle of Wight, England

Coordinates: 50.714°N 1.227°W

- Site of Special Scientific Interest
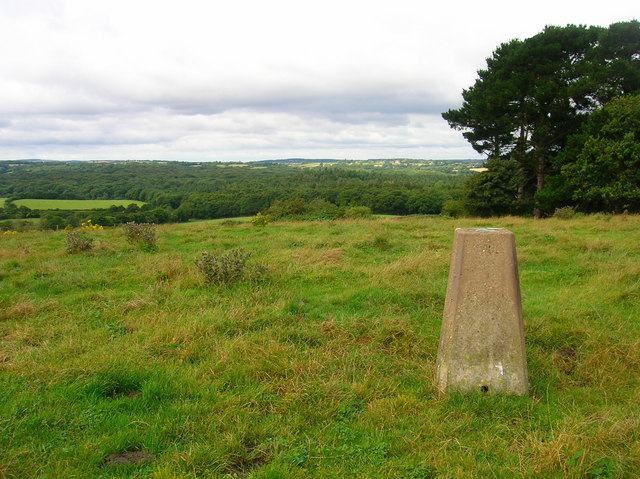
- Trig point on the hill north of Havenstreet, looking in a south westerly direction towards Briddlesford Copse
- Location of Briddlesford Copses.
- Area of search: Isle of Wight
- Grid reference: SZ549904
- Interest: Biological
- Area: 167.2 ha (413 acres)
- Notification date: 2003
- Location map: Natural England

Briddleford Copses is a 167.2-hectare (413-acre) Site of Special Scientific Interest (SSSI) and Special Area of Conservation (SAC) which is south of Wootton Bridge on the Isle of Wight in Britain. The site was designated an SAC in 1995 in recognition of the internationally important breeding population of Bechstein's bat that are resident there. The majority of the copses form part of the Briddlesford Nature Reserve, owned and managed by the People's Trust for Endangered Species (PTES), a charitable organisation.

Part of the Briddleford Copses SSSI is owned by the Forestry Commission
