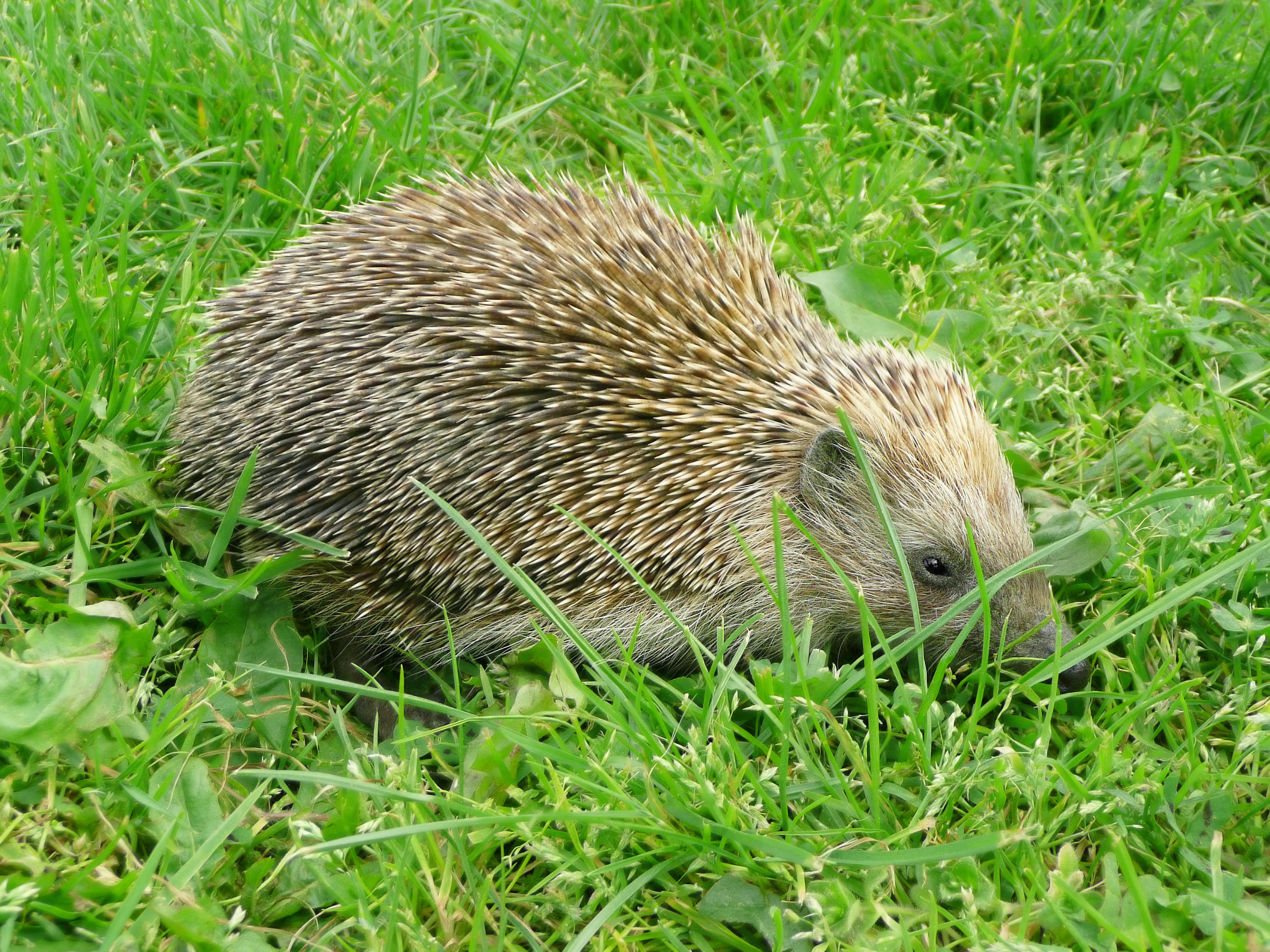

Conservation status
- Least Concern (IUCN 3.1)

Scientific classification
- Kingdom: Animalia
- Phylum: Chordata
- Class: Mammalia
- Order: Eulipotyphla
- Family: Erinaceidae
- Genus: Erinaceus
- Species: E. concolor

Binomial name
- Erinaceus concolor Martin, 1838
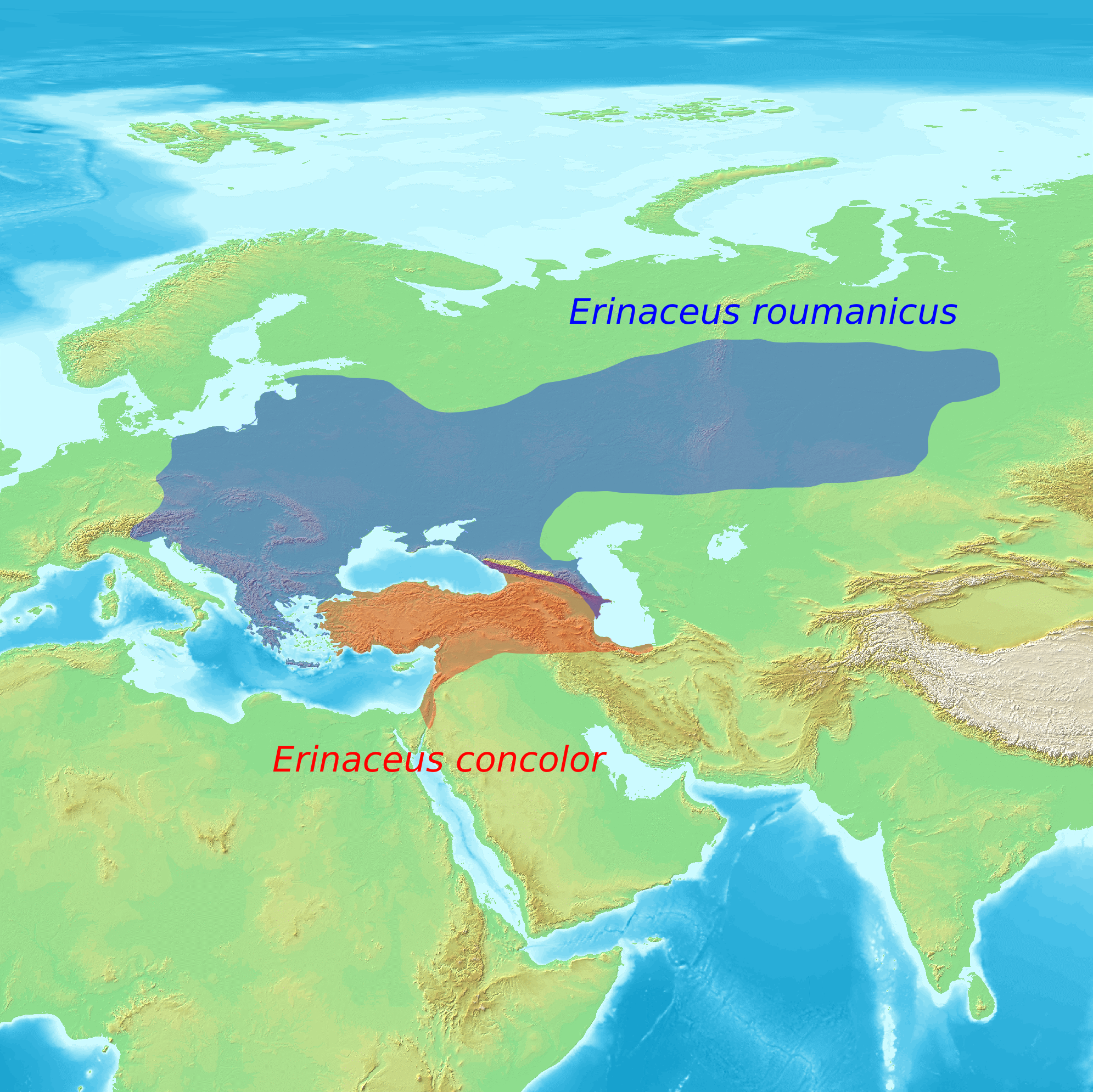
- Range of the southern white-breasted hedgehog (red)

= Southern white-breasted hedgehog =

Species of mammal

The southern white-breasted hedgehog (Erinaceus concolor), sometimes referred to as white-bellied hedgehog or white-chested hedgehog, is a hedgehog native to Eastern Europe and Southwestern Asia. These hedgehogs are becomingly increasingly popular as pets in the United States and Iran.

== Description ==
It is very similar in appearance to the European hedgehog (E. europaeus), but it has a white spot on its chest that easily distinguishes them. They weigh between 680 and 900 grams. Their body weight drops no lower than 600 grams during hibernation.

== Origins ==
The white breasted hedgehog diverged from a split lineage due to geographical features. The Caucasus Mountains played a significant role in dividing the white breasted hedgehog to southern and northern locations. North of the Caucasus Mountains lies Russia, which is where some white breasted hedgehogs are located. Other hedgehogs live in Turkey, Iran, and Israel due to the distribution of this species.

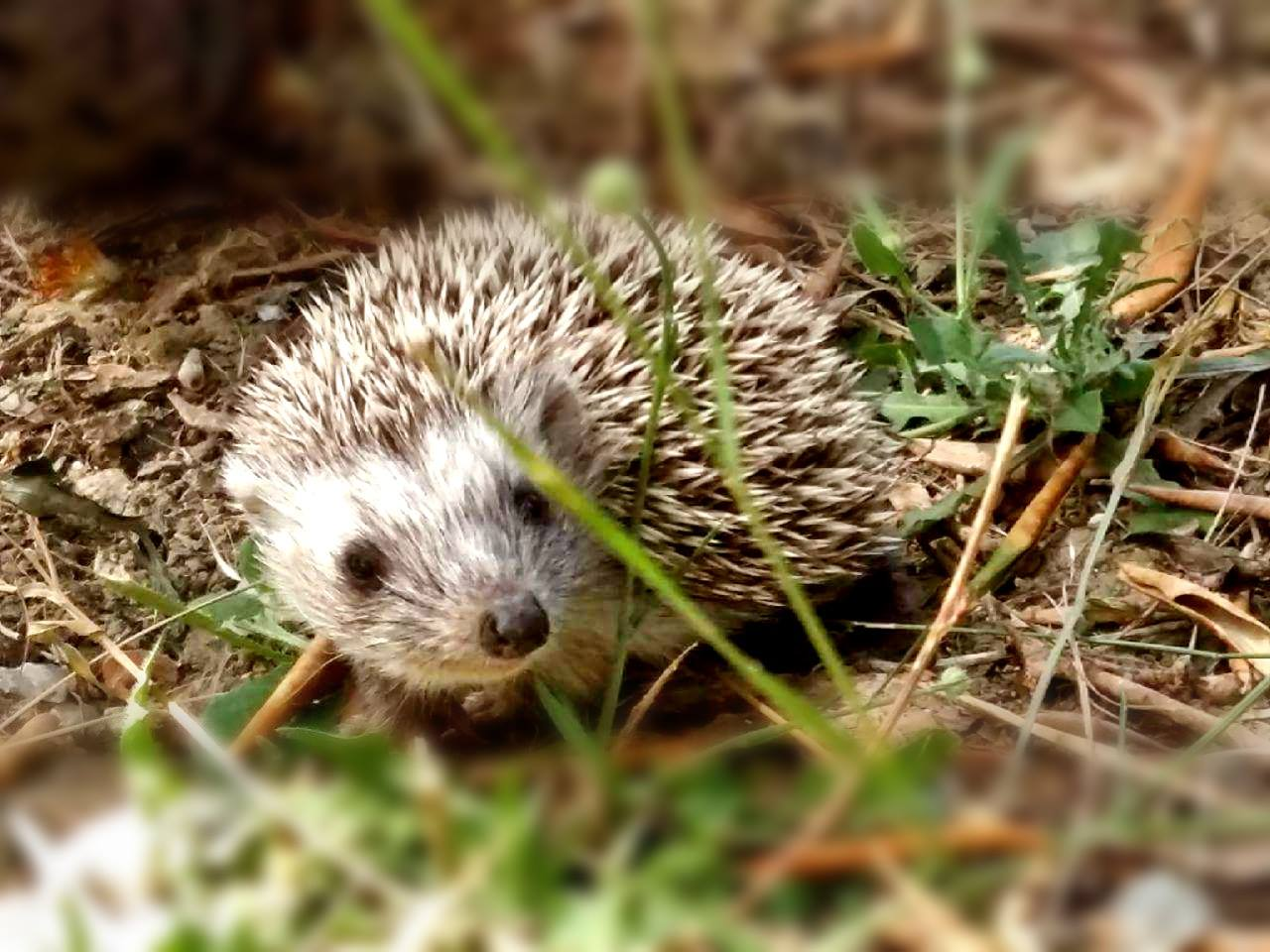
Southern white-breasted hedgehog

== Taxonomy ==
For a long time these two species were considered to be one. The northern white-breasted hedgehog of Eastern Europe and Russia was formerly recognized as a subspecies of the southern white-breasted hedgehog but newer investigations see both as different species. The southern white-breasted hedgehog and European hedgehog can hybridize.

== Similar hedgehogs ==
Some relatives to the southern white-breasted hedgehog consist of the west European (Erinaceus europaeus) and northern white-breasted hedgehogs (Erinaceus roumanicus). These two species are creating gene flow through reproducing with one another and result in generating hybrids. Gene studies were conducted and discovered that the northern southern white breasted hedgehogs have more expressed genes than the west European hedgehog in the hybrid species.

== Behaviour ==
Like most hedgehogs, the southern white-breasted hedgehog's habitat ranges from deciduous forests to parks and gardens. Their diet is the same as well, consisting mostly of insects, slugs, snails, and worms. They also prey upon toxic beetles which they happen to be immune to. The breeding period is between March and July, with up to 7 offspring being produced after a gestation period of about 6 weeks. They hibernate from November to March. Unlike its European counterpart, the southern white-breasted hedgehog never digs dens. It prefers building grass nests in secluded places.

== Parasites ==
The species carries a host of ectoparasites such as ticks and fleas and due to their increasing popularity as exotic pets, this can lead to a potential transmission of zoonotic diseases. Lungworm is another type of parasite in the southern white breasted hedgehog. There are two species of lungworm that these hedgehogs can contract: Crenosoma striatum and Capillaria aerophila. Southern white breasted hedgehogs can have one or both types of lungworm infection, which can be life-threatening. Symptoms of lungworm include weight loss, trouble breathing, and reduced physical activity. Scientists discovered a successful treatment plan for deworming the southern white breasted hedgehog by giving a single dose of Moxidectin/Praziquantel.

Bartonella infection, which is an infection caused by the bacterium Bartonella, was found in 5 out of 57 southern white breasted hedgehogs in a study conducted in 2016. This study was the first to find Bartonella DNA in hedgehogs.
