= People's Trust for Endangered Species =

UK-based charitable organisation

- Abbreviation: PTES
- Formation: 1977
- Legal status: Charitable organization
- Purpose: Science-led conservation of rare and endangered species and habitats
- Location(s): 3 Cloisters House; 8 Battersea Park Road; London; SW8 4BG
- Region served: UK, funds projects worldwide
- Members: 20 employees (2025); ~50,000 volunteers
- Chief Executive: Nida Al-Fulaij
- Main organ: Board of Trustees
- Website: ptes.org

People's Trust for Endangered Species (PTES) is a UK-based charitable organisation registered in England and Wales. Founded in 1977, PTES works on the frontlines of conservation by supporting vital projects that address the threats faced by species at risk of extinction globally. Through a combination of scientific research, monitoring, education, habitat restoration and public engagement, the organisation seeks to ensure that endangered species not only survive but thrive. It also owns and manages two nature reserves. PTES collaborates with local communities, governments, and conservation organisations worldwide to create lasting solutions for the preservation of biodiversity. With a focus on both iconic species and lesser-known wildlife, PTES is committed to ensuring these animals thrive in the future. As of January 2026, PTES has 20 employees, five trustees and coordinates around 50,000 volunteers in the UK. PTES relies on donations from the general public and grants from trusts and foundations to continue its work - it receives no core funding from the UK Government. The organisation has registered charity number 274206.

== History ==
PTES was founded in 1977. Originally based in South Kensington at Imperial College London, PTES moved to its present location in Battersea, south-west London in 1993. In 2001 PTES developed Mammals Trust UK, a restricted fund and campaign targeting the conservation of British mammals. In 2006, Mammals Trust UK was incorporated under the activities of PTES. PTES still operates a ring-fenced funding stream for British mammals but the names 'Mammals Trust UK' and 'Mammals Trust' have since been disbanded.

== Activities ==
PTES exists to support and restore natural heritage – the diverse assemblages of species and their habitats – through practical conservation and by educating and informing people about its importance. The charity supports conservation projects and research both in the UK and abroad through three funding schemes: 'Conservation Insight Grants', 'UK mammal grants' and 'Conservation Internship Awards'. The charity's work in the UK has a focus on mammals, with hazel dormice, European hedgehogs and European water voles as the current key species. Saproxylic beetles are also a key group. Traditional orchards, wood pasture and parkland, and hedgerows are key habitats. Assistance from volunteers and collaboration with other environmental organisations are integral to this work.

=== Wildlife Surveys ===
PTES runs several national, public-participation surveys aimed at monitoring wild populations and habitats.

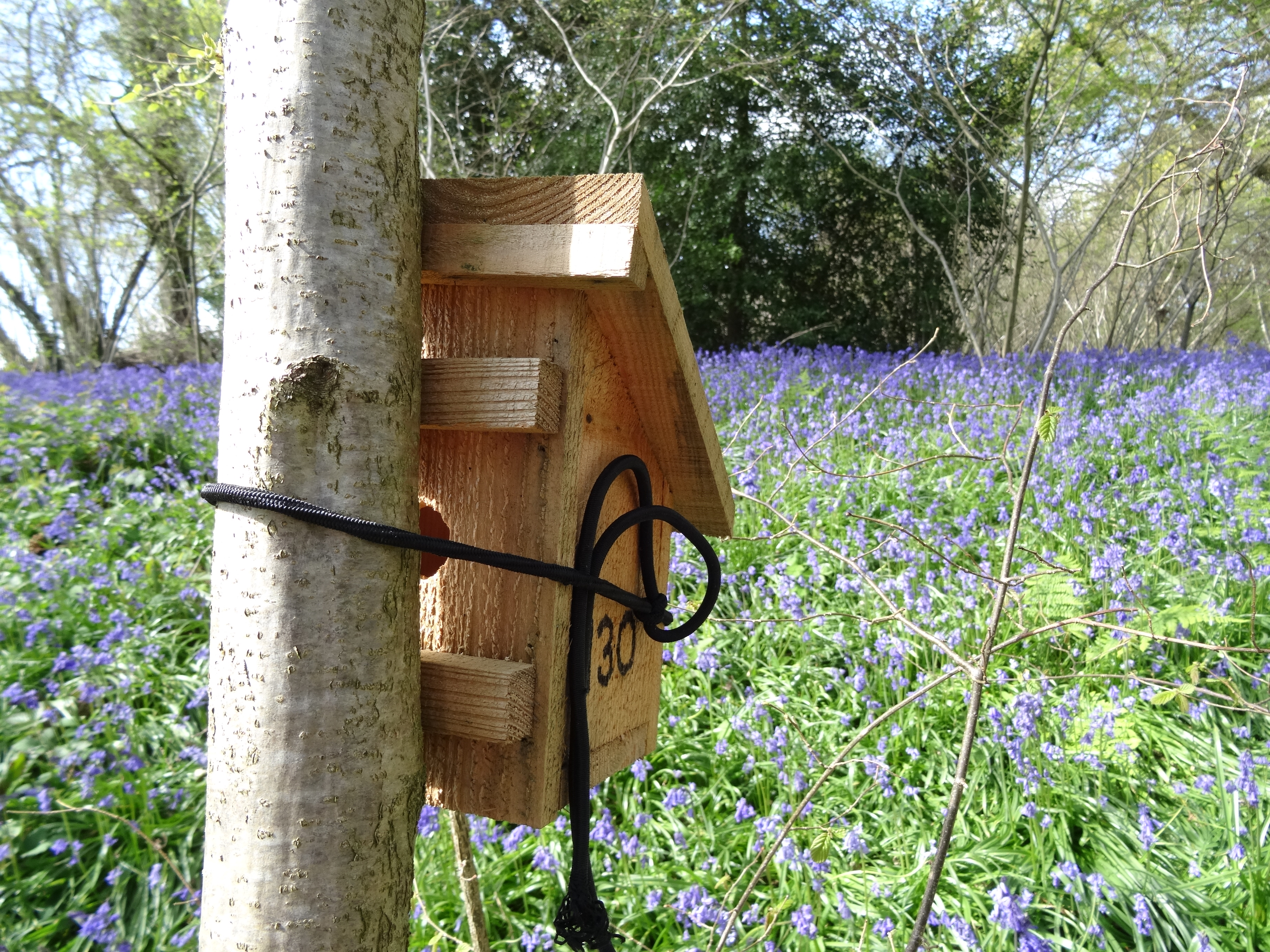
One of ~500 dormouse nest boxes at Briddlesford Nature Reserve, used to monitor the population within these woodlands as part of the NDMP.

As of 2026, extant surveys are:

- National Dormouse Monitoring Survey (NDMP) (1993 – present): The NDMP is run in partnership with Natural England and was set up to monitor the state of Britain's Dormouse population. To set up an NDMP site, a site with a known dormouse population is selected and 50 nest boxes are put up spaced about 15m-20m apart. Trained and licensed volunteers then check the boxes at least twice a year and record the number of dormouse found and basic biometric data such as sex and age. The data is submitted annually to PTES. In 2023, 5493 dormouse records were submitted from 371 sites.
- Living with Mammals (2003 – present): an annual survey recording sightings and/or field signs of mammals at sites within the built environment. These are mainly urban or suburban green spaces such as gardens, allotments, cemeteries and recreational ground. Living with Mammals (2003) was a founding member of the Tracking Mammals Partnership.
- The Traditional Orchard Survey of England and Wales (2006 – present): orchards and fruit trees provide a highly biodiverse habitat and are listed as a Priority Habitat under the UK Biodiversity Action Plan (BAP). PTES has created a UK inventory and map of the habitat.
- National Water Vole Monitoring Programme (NWVMP) (2015 – present): Water voles have declined by over 90% in Britain since the 1980s. The National Water Vole Monitoring Programme is the first ongoing monitoring scheme for this species in the UK and aims to bring together data from several hundred sites to allow the status of the species to be assessed year-on-year. Between 1989 and 1998 the Vincent Wildlife Trust (VWT) conducted two national water vole surveys that demonstrated the dramatic decline of our water voles. The randomly selected sites that were visited during these two surveys form the basis of the NWVMP. PTES annually resurveys these sites to find out what's happened since 1998 and also detect any future changes.
- Great British Hedgerow Survey (2020 – present): Designed for both land managers that may want to improve the structural condition of their own hedgerows, but also for interested wildlife groups that want assess the quality of habitat in any particular area, the Great British Hedgerow Survey data is collected in order to provide an overview of the condition of hedgerows nationally. This helps guide future conservation work by People's Trust for Endangered Species and partners, whether it be through active, on-the-ground conservation or the messages we are putting out to the public.
- Healthy Hedgerows (2020 – present): Healthy Hedgerows is a rapid hedgerow health checking survey. By answering a handful of simple questions, the hedgerow health-checker places each hedge surveyed in the hedgerow lifecycle (based on the Adams Hedgerow Management Scale) and provides instant management options. It has been designed for farmers and landowners who would like to understand their whole hedge network and create a hedge management plan at the farm scale.
- National Hedgehog Monitoring Programme (NHMP) (2024 – present): The NHMP is a project, that will, for the first time, produce robust hedgehog population estimates. With this knowledge, PTES will make effective conservation plans to reverse the decline of this iconic species.

=== Campaigns ===
==== Hedgehog Street ====
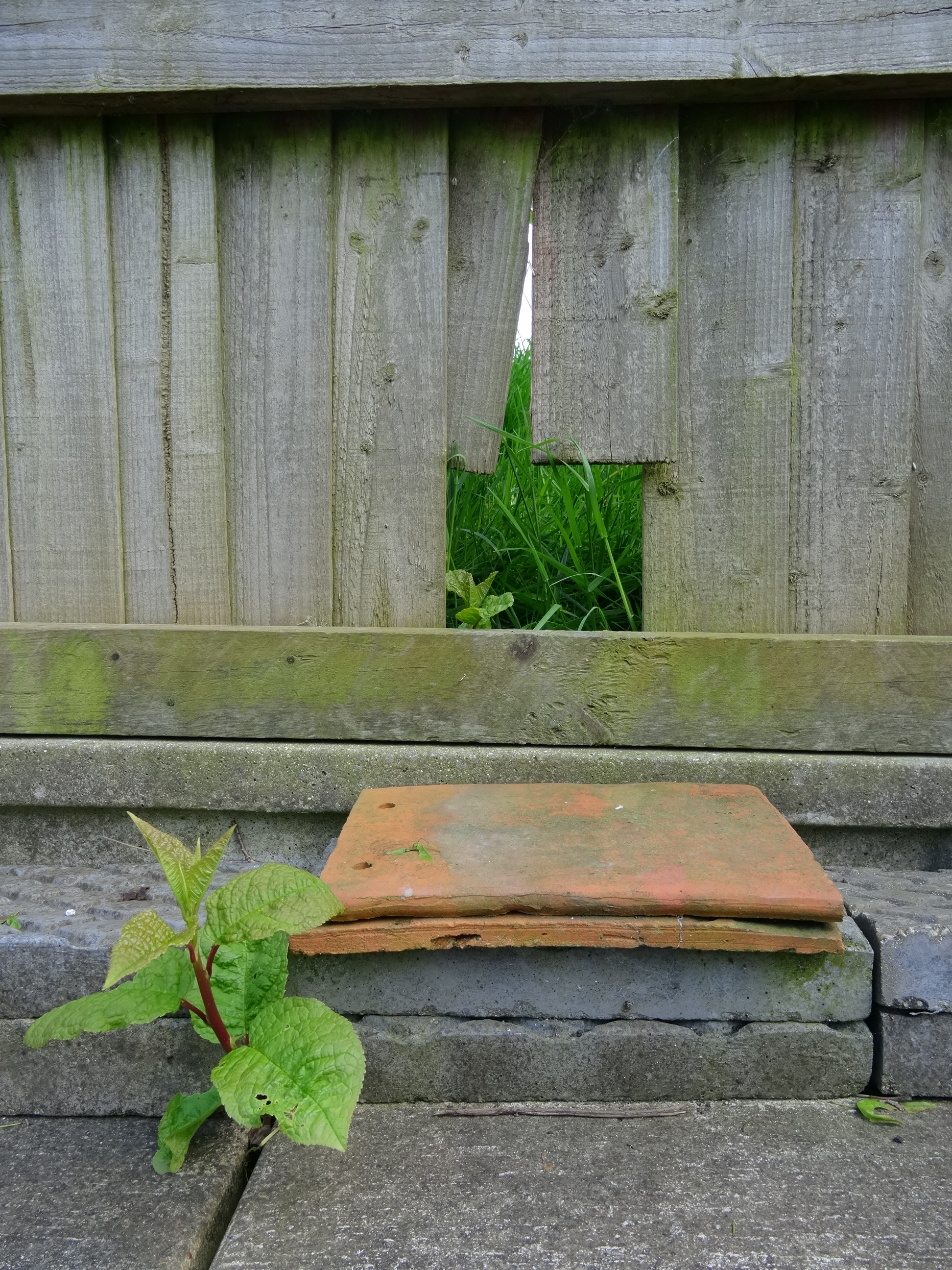
Linking gardens is central to Hedgehog Street as impermeable garden fences and walls can make hedgehog populations unviable.

In 2011, in partnership with wildlife charity the British Hedgehog Preservation Society (BHPS), PTES launched the campaign 'Hedgehog Street' in response to a detected decline in Britain's hedgehog (Erinaceus europaeus) population.

As of 2026, the campaign has more than 130,000 registered volunteers called 'Hedgehog Champions' who are committed to making changes in their gardens to encourage and support hedgehogs. The Hedgehog Street website provides volunteers with information about the ecology and behaviour of hedgehogs, tips on ways of managing gardens to benefit them, and free resources to encourage volunteers to recruit other people to participate.

One of the major objectives of the campaign is to work with the public and housing developers to connect gardens and greenspaces with 'Hedgehog Highways', which are 13cm x 13cm square holes in fences/boundaries that allow hedgehogs to travel further to find food and nesting sites.

As part of the joint campaign, PTES coordinates the European Hedgehog Research Group and convenes a steering group for the species, based on the previous BAP group, that includes the British Hedgehog Preservation Society (BHPS), mammal ecologist Dr Pat Morris, and hedgehog enthusiast and author Hugh Warwick. In 2025, they produced the first conservation strategy for the species in the UK. The only UK training course on hedgehog-friendly land management, surveying and mitigation for professionals has also been developed and is being delivered around the UK.

PTES also supports research into the causes of hedgehog decline. Some of this is jointly funded with BHPS.

=== Reserves ===
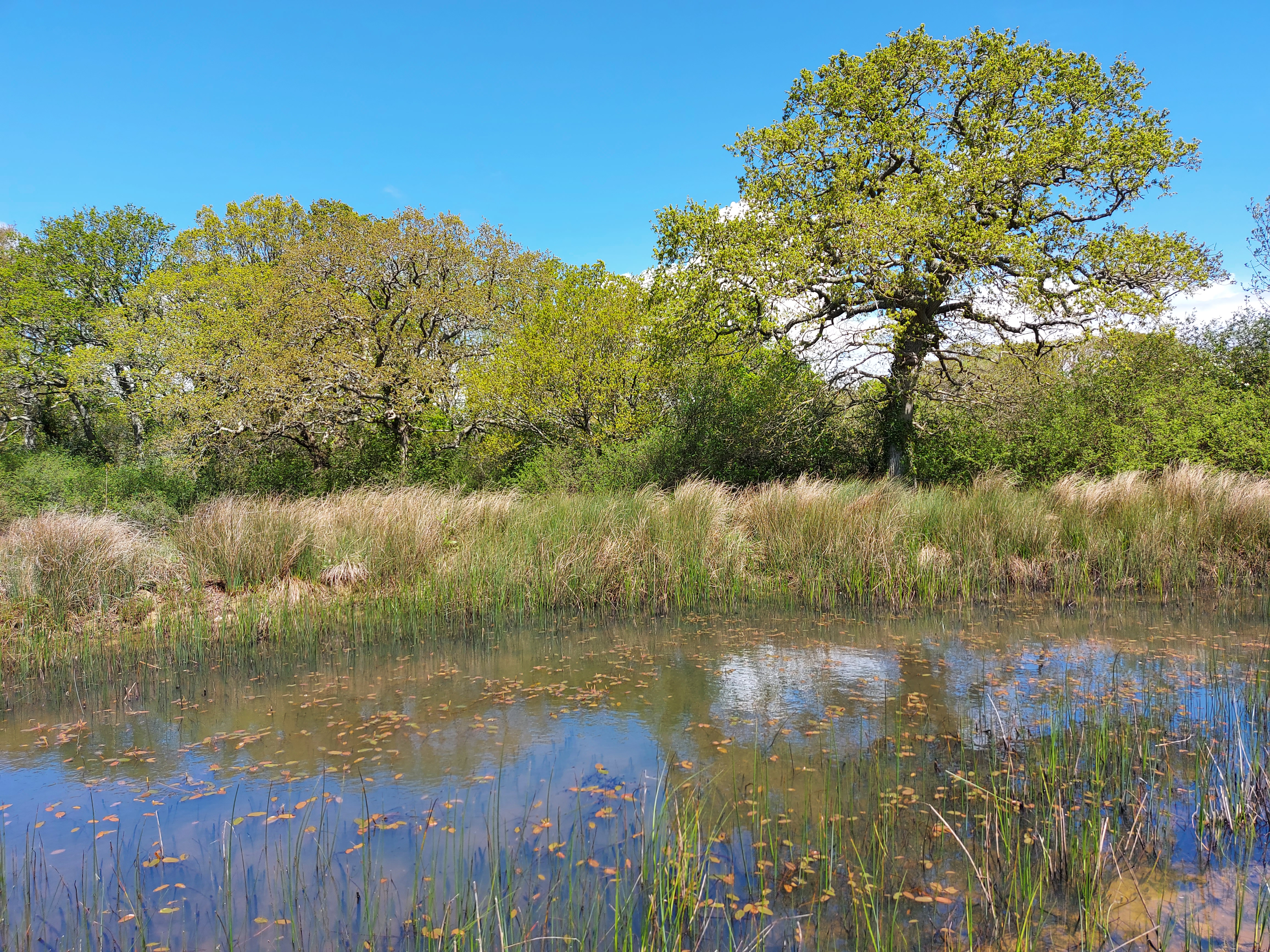
One of twenty new ponds at Briddlesford Nature Reserve created since the year 2000

==== Briddlesford ====
PTES own and manage 158 hectares of land on the Isle of Wight, including a majority of the Briddlesford Copses Site of Special Scientific Interest (SSSI) and Special Area of Conservation (SAC) together with about 50 hectares of farmland. The Briddlesford Copses represent the largest remaining block of ancient semi-natural woodland on the Isle of Wight. Notable species present include Hazel dormouse, Bechstein's bat, barbastelle bat, red squirrel, narrow-leaved lungwort and the fungus weevil Pseudeuparius sepicola.

==== Rough Hill ====
Rough Hill is a traditionally managed orchard of ~4 hectares, located on a bank of the river Avon on the outskirts of Pershore, Worcestershire. Since being acquired by the Trust in 2003, the orchard is being sensitively restored for the benefit of its biodiversity and heritage value. The principal management activities are the provision and care of new fruit trees, restoration pruning of extant mature trees, and the use of extensive livestock grazing to manage the species-rich calcareous grassland communities present.

== Associate organisations ==
PTES is a member of the IUCN and Wildlife and Countryside Link. PTES is also one of the original organisations in the State of Nature partnership.
