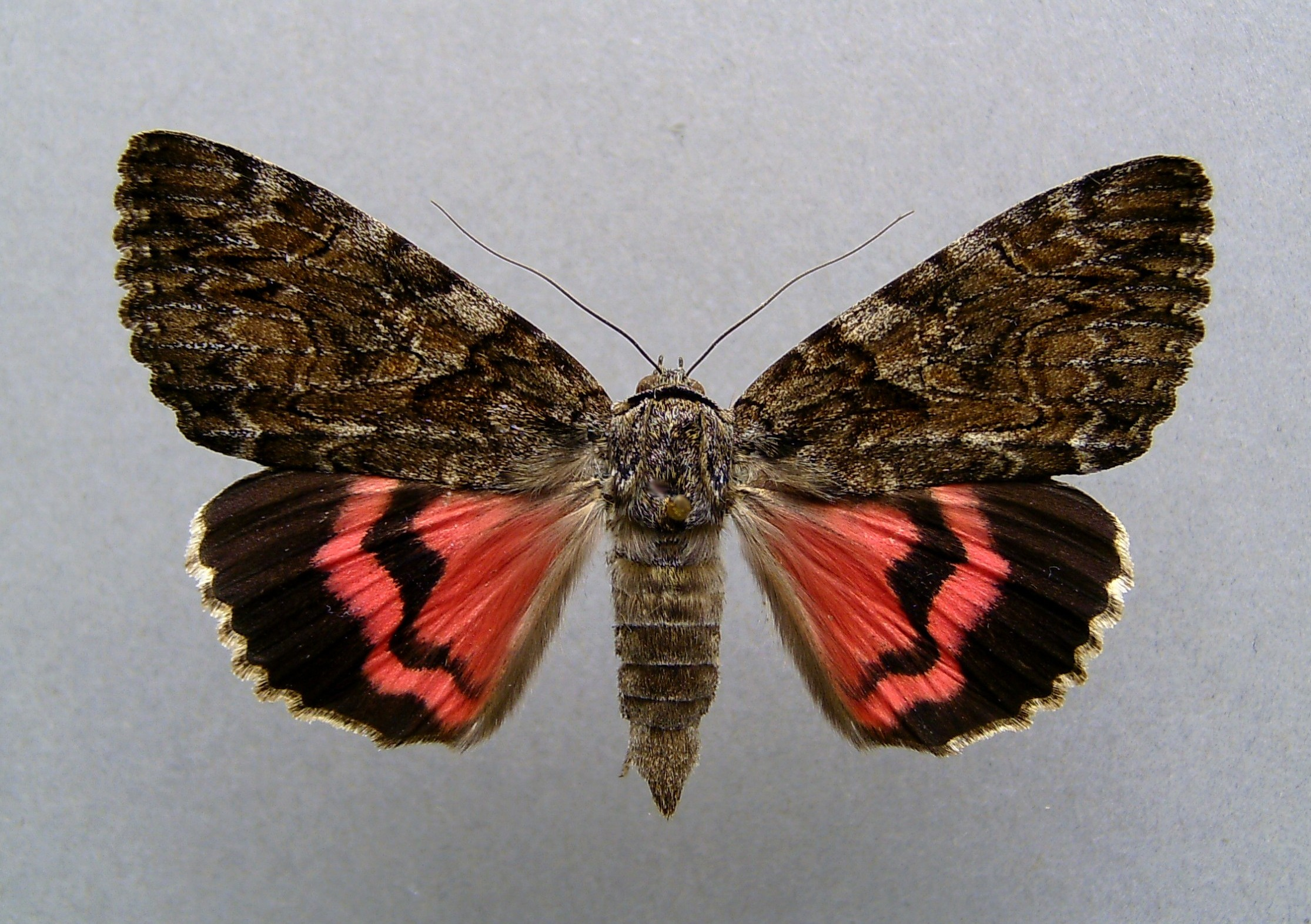

Scientific classification
- Kingdom: Animalia
- Phylum: Arthropoda
- Clade: Pancrustacea
- Class: Insecta
- Order: Lepidoptera
- Superfamily: Noctuoidea
- Family: Erebidae
- Genus: Catocala
- Species: C. dilecta

Binomial name
- Catocala dilecta (Hübner, 1808)

Synonyms
- Noctua dilecta Hübner, 1808; Catocala dayremi Oberthur, 1907; Catocala laetita Schawerda, 1931; Catocala powelli Oberthur, 1907

= Catocala dilecta =

Species of moth

Catocala dilecta is a moth of the family Erebidae first described by Jacob Hübner in 1808. It is found in north-western Africa through southern Europe to Asia Minor.

The wingspan is 78–84 mm. Adults are on wing from July to September.
