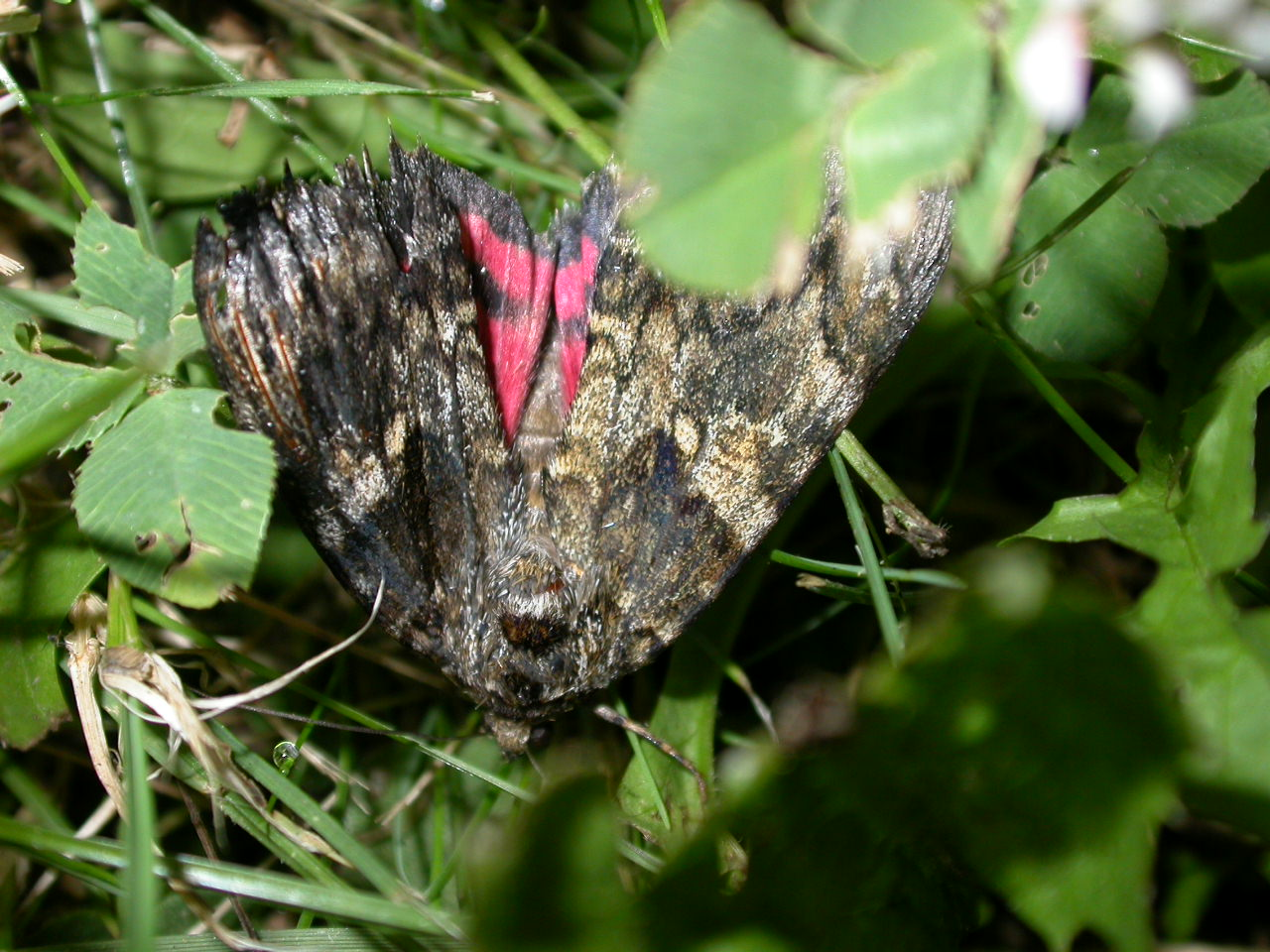

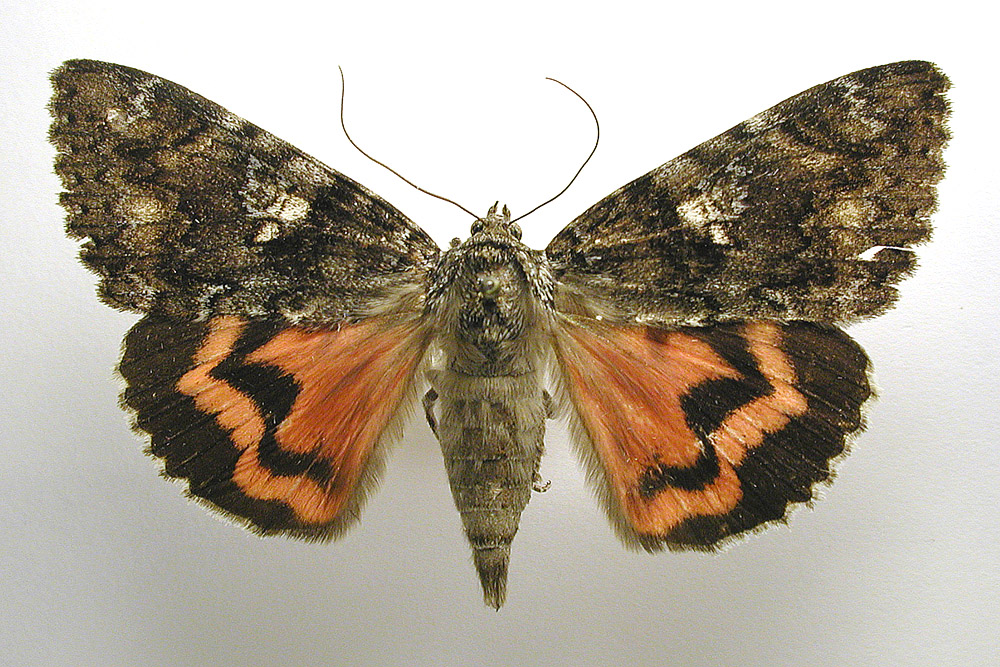

Scientific classification
- Kingdom: Animalia
- Phylum: Arthropoda
- Clade: Pancrustacea
- Class: Insecta
- Order: Lepidoptera
- Superfamily: Noctuoidea
- Family: Erebidae
- Genus: Catocala
- Species: C. sponsa

Binomial name
- Catocala sponsa (Linnaeus, 1767)

Synonyms
- Phalaena sponsa Linnaeus, 1767; Noctua rejecta Fischer de Waldheim, 1820; Catocala sponsa var. laeta Oberthür, 1907; Catocala sponsa var. purpurea Oberthür, 1922

= Catocala sponsa =

Species of moth

Catocala sponsa, the dark crimson underwing, is a species of moth of the family Erebidae. It is found in Europe, North Africa and from Anatolia up to the Caucasus.

== Technical description and variation ==
M. sponsa L. Somewhat smaller and paler than dilecta; generally with a pale fulvous tint below middle in the space between outer and submarginal lines; the lunule between veins 3 and 4 nearly always paler; the pale outline of the reniform stigma, the whitish spot preceding it, and the white spot beneath it often conspicuous; but both of these spots may be of the ground colour or yellowish, as well as white; hindwing with the inner margin not darkened; the red ground colour not so deep; — the form rejecta Fisch.-Wald. besides being smaller in point of size, has the hindwing clouded with fuscous in basal area; the median band thickened, and the red band following it much narrower than usual; the terminal border brownish black, and the red ground dull pink; to judge from the appearance only, this might well be a distinct species;- examples in which the median space between inner and outer lines is prominently paler grey than the other areas are separated by Spuler as ab. fasciata; — in ab. desponsa Schultz the red of hindwing is either wholly yellow or partially changed to that colour; but examples of such change in this species are much rarer than in nupta and elocata. — in ab. florida Schultz, which must come very near to fasciata Spul., the median area and terminal area beyond subterminal line are whitish grey, while the basal area and space between outer line and subterminal are pale brown; — ab. grisea ab. nov. (a female of which is in the Tring Museum from Uralsk, sent by M. Bartel), is entirely dark grey grizzled with pale grey, without any brown or fulvous tints, the lines black; — subsp. laeta Oberth., from Algeria, is brighter than S. European examples, the median area at each end dusted with whitish, the subterminal line whitish, and the annulus of the reniform and the spots before and below it white. — Larva grey brown or red brown, finely dark dotted; dorsal tubercles reddish: the hump on segment 9 prominent, with an oval yellow transverse marking edged with black: the hump on segment 12 also strong, with the two hind tubercles on it developed into brown points; head grey with black streaks.

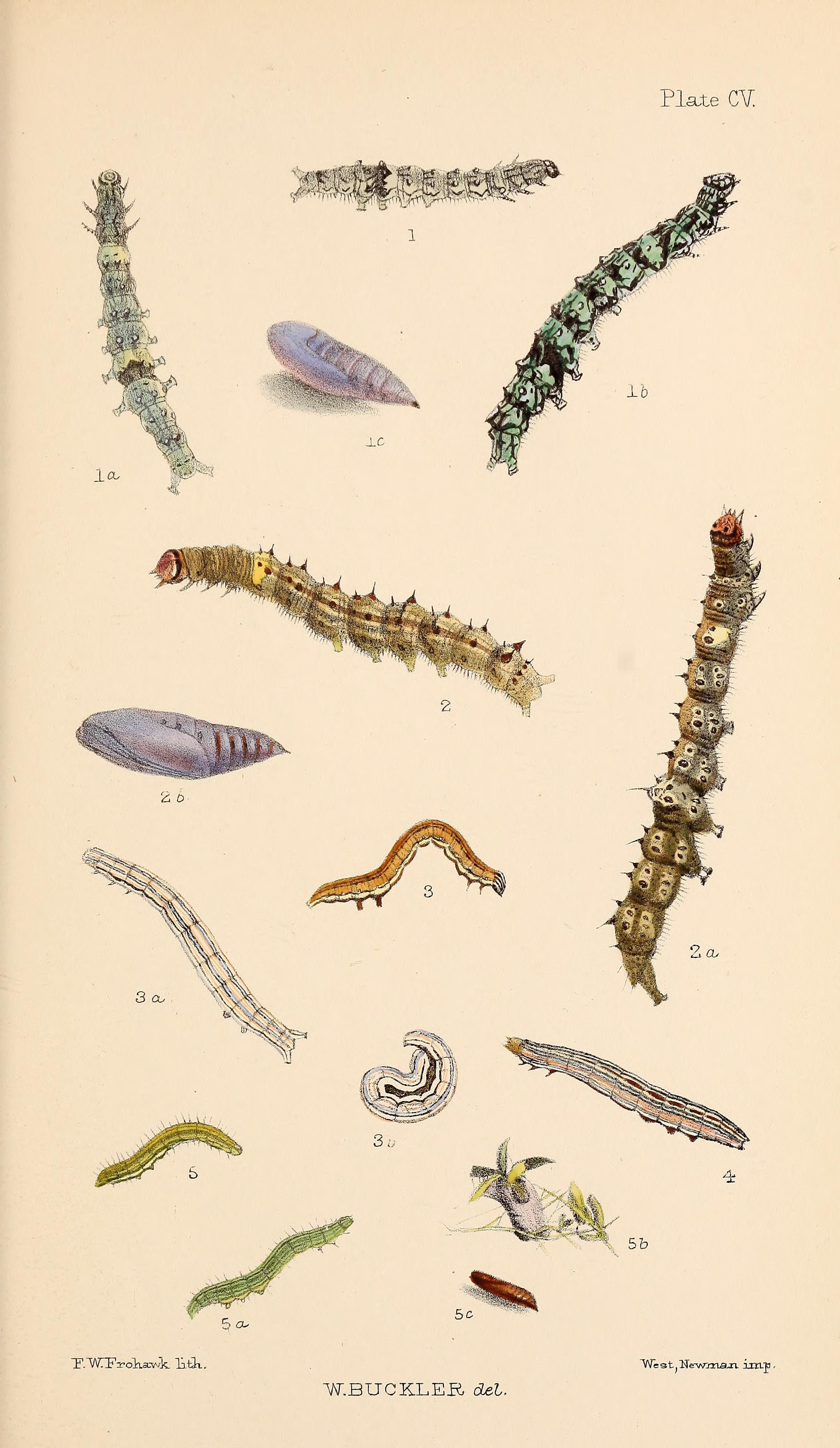
Figs 2, 2a larvae after last moult 2b pupa

== Biology ==
Adults are on wing from July to September depending on the location.

The larvae feed on oak.
