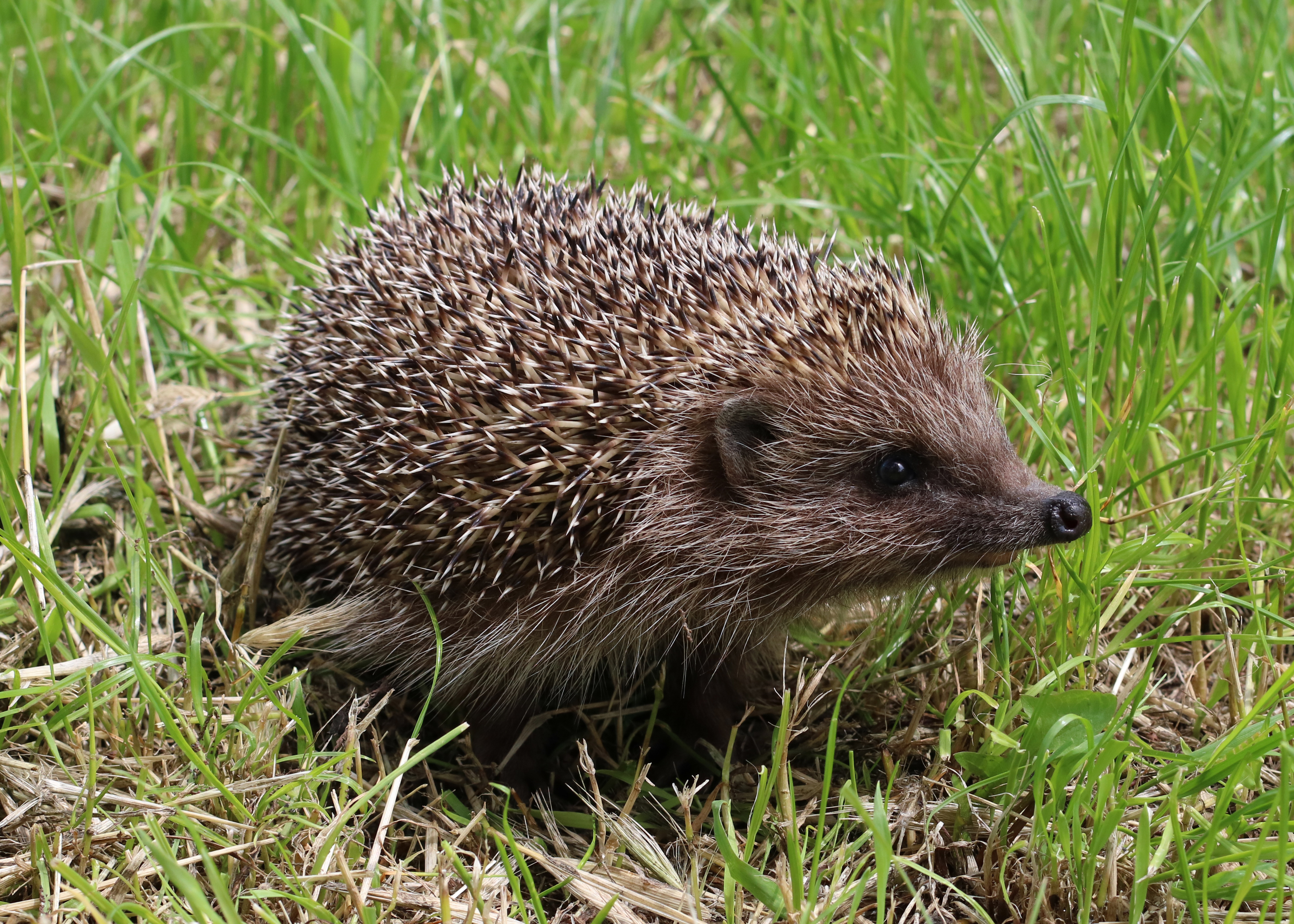

Conservation status
- Least Concern (IUCN 3.1)

Scientific classification
- Kingdom: Animalia
- Phylum: Chordata
- Class: Mammalia
- Order: Eulipotyphla
- Family: Erinaceidae
- Genus: Erinaceus
- Species: E. roumanicus

Binomial name
- Erinaceus roumanicus Barrett-Hamilton, 1900
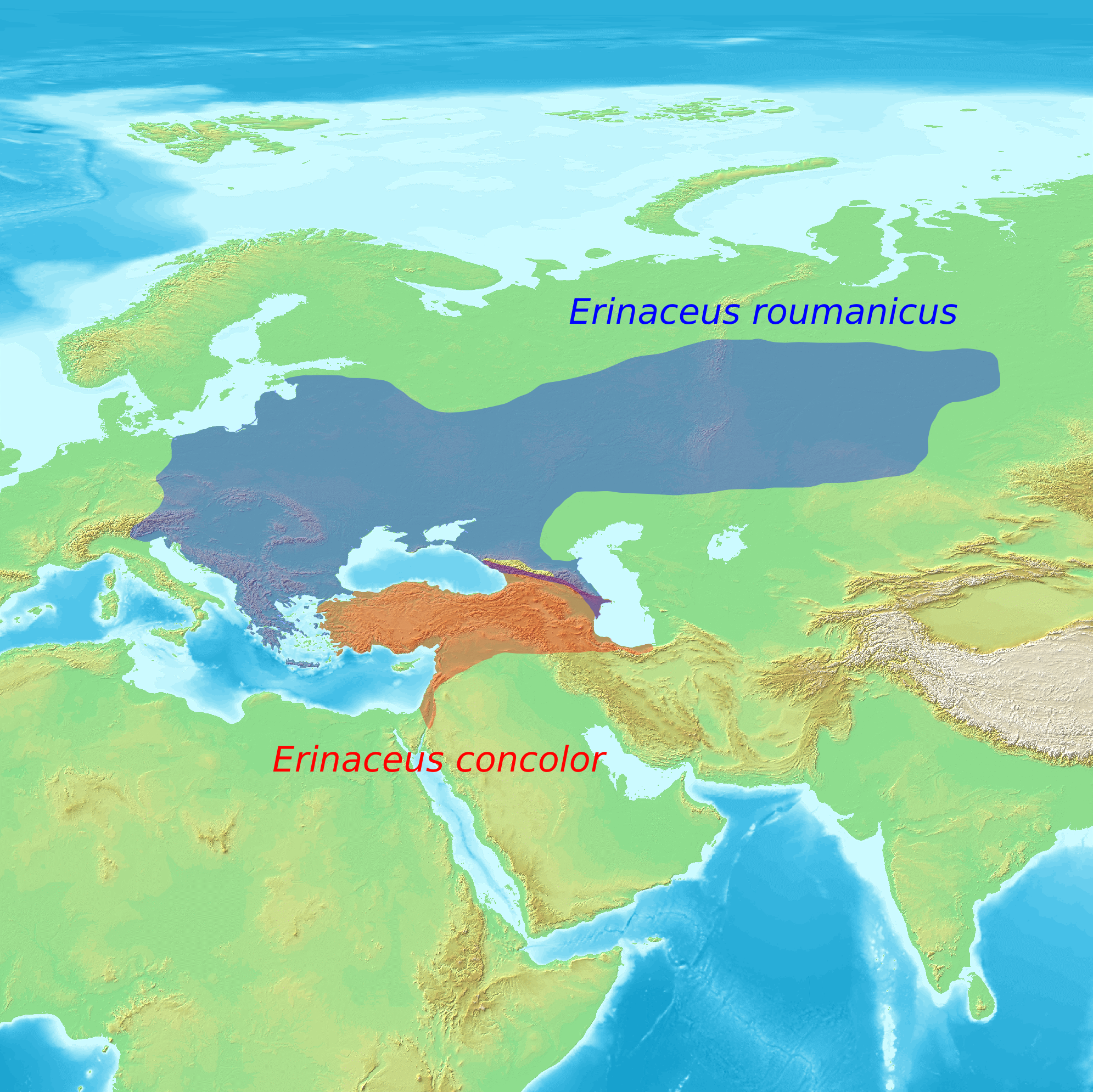
- Range of the northern white-breasted hedgehog (blue)

= Northern white-breasted hedgehog =

Species of mammal

The northern white-breasted hedgehog (Erinaceus roumanicus) is a species of hedgehog.

== Distribution ==
The range of the species extends in the west as far as Poland, Austria and the Croatian Adriatic Islands and as far south as continental Greece and Aegean Islands, including substantial populations on Crete, Corfu and Rhodes. It is found eastwards through Russia as far east as the Ob River in Siberia. It is widespread throughout this range, and there are no signs of a significant population decline in any specific region, with abundance in specific regions.

== Taxonomy ==
Taxonomically, it was for a time considered to be a subspecies of E. europaeus, and later a subspecies of E. concolor. Since the 1990s, it has been considered a separate species in its own right, following new genetic and morphological studies, with five subspecies: E. r. roumanicus, E. r. bolkayi, E. r. drozdovskii, E. r. nesiotes, and E. r. pallidus.

== Variation ==
In Europe, the size of the northern white-breasted hedgehog in southern Europe was greater in comparison to white-breasted hedgehog in northern Europe. The size of the northern white-breasted hedgehog varied based on the temperature and precipitation, the size of the white-breasted hedgehog was larger in higher temperatures. The higher the precipitation, specifically summer precipitation, the smaller the size of the white-breasted hedgehog.

== Parasites ==
The species is a common synanthrope and is known to carry not only the hedgehog tick, Ixodes hexagonus, but also Ixodes ricinus, the most common European tick species. They are known also to host zoonotic Bartonellae species. A large-scale molecular investigation of fleas was performed to the white-breasted hedgehog due to them being a geographically widespread species and being a very urbanized species. The widespreadness and urbanization of the species gives the white-breasted hedgehog a chance to spread their fleas, specifically Archaeopsylla erinacei, to cats and dogs, which could lead to spread to humans. In the investigation, all fleas were positive for rickettsiae. In this investigation, 759 fleas were studied, there was detection of Rickettsia helvetica (1.5%), Bartonella henselae (0.7%), hemoplasmas of the hemofelis group (5.2%), and rickettsia genotype were identified (10%).
