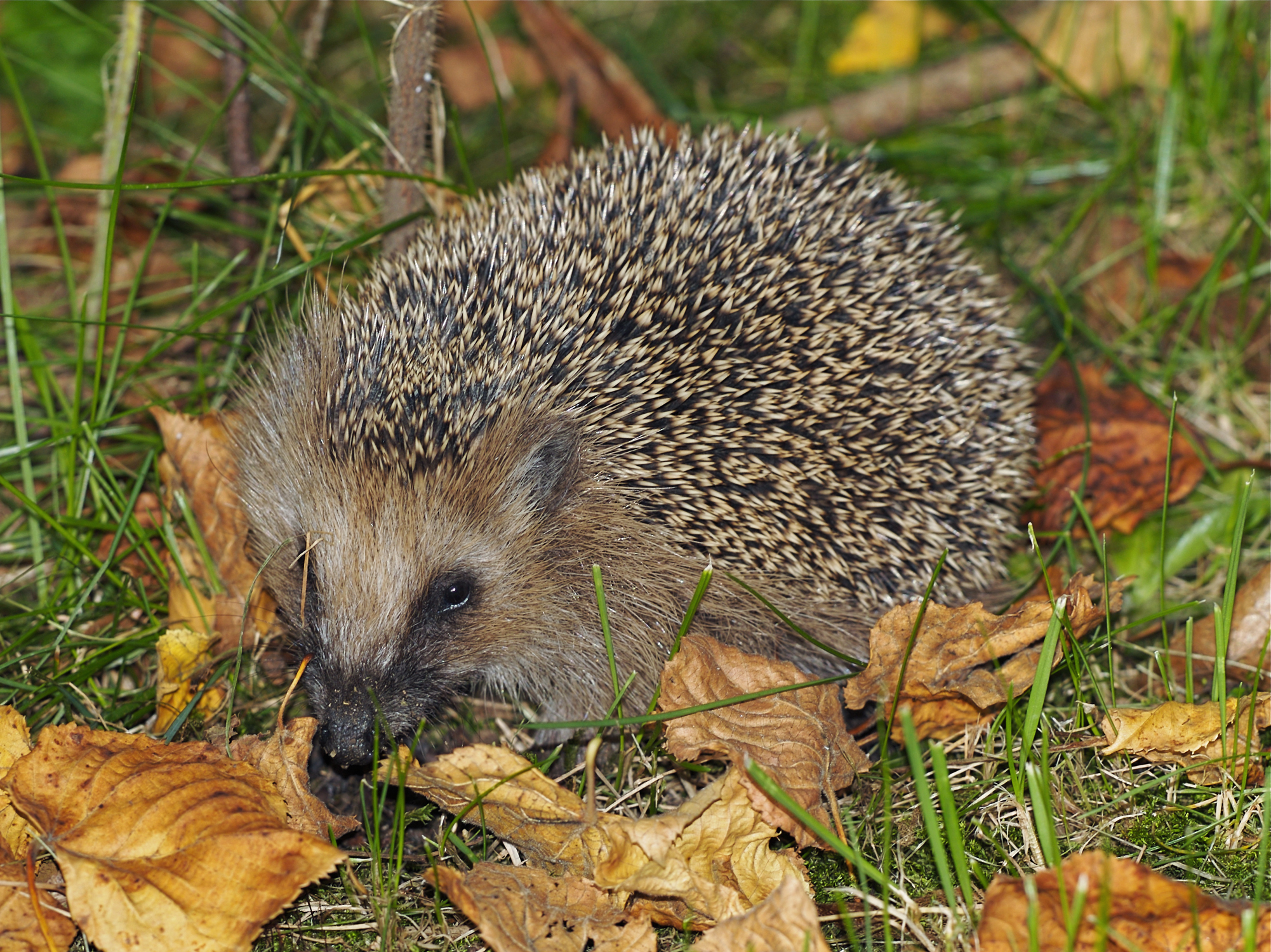

Conservation status
- Near Threatened (IUCN 3.1)

Scientific classification
- Kingdom: Animalia
- Phylum: Chordata
- Class: Mammalia
- Order: Eulipotyphla
- Family: Erinaceidae
- Genus: Erinaceus
- Species: E. europaeus

Binomial name
- Erinaceus europaeus Linnaeus, 1758
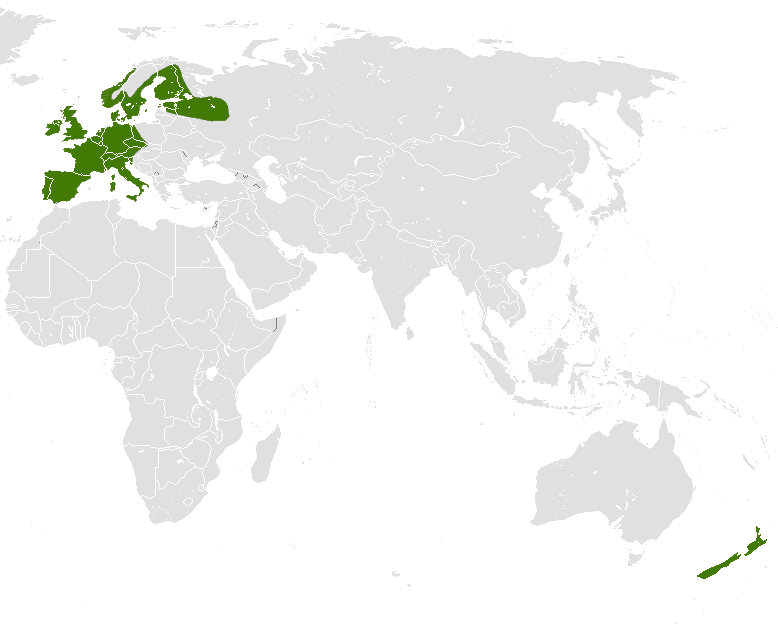
- Range including introductions
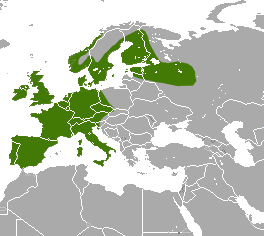
- Native range of European hedgehog

= European hedgehog =

European hedgehog Temporal range: Middle Pleistocene – Recent

Species of small spiny mammal

The European hedgehog (Erinaceus europaeus), also known as the West European hedgehog, Western European hedgehog or common hedgehog, is a hedgehog species native to Europe from Iberia and Italy northwards into Scandinavia and westwards into Ireland. It is a generally common and widely distributed species that can survive across a wide range of habitat types. It is a well-known species, and a favourite in European gardens, both for its endearing appearance and its preference for eating a range of garden pests. While populations are currently stable across much of its range, it is declining severely in Great Britain, where it is now Red Listed, meaning that it is considered to be at risk of local extinction. Outside its native range the species was introduced to New Zealand during the late nineteenth and early twentieth centuries.

== Description ==
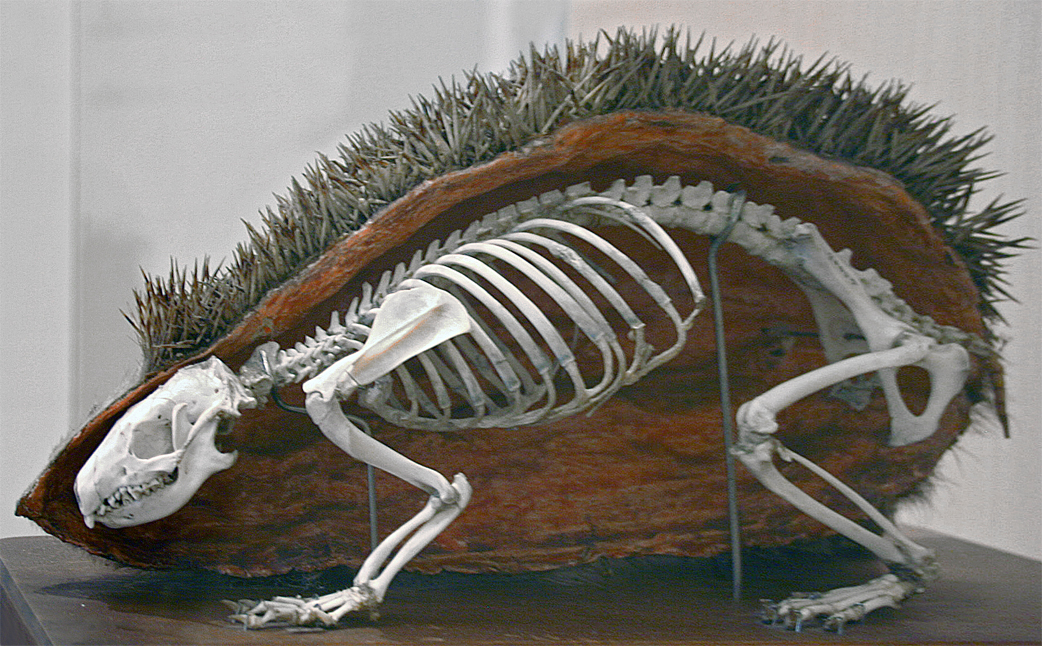
Skeleton of a European hedgehog

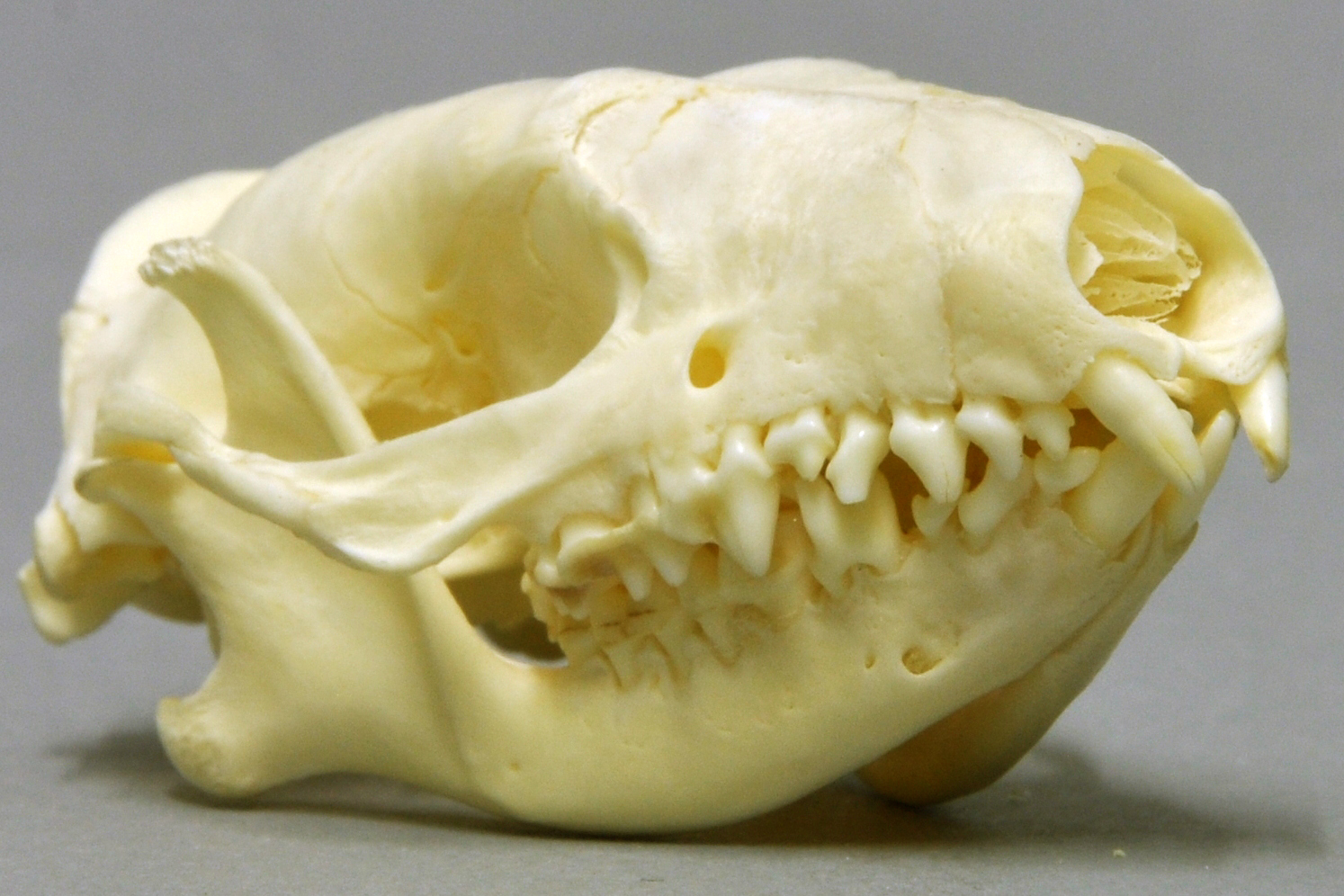
Skull of a European hedgehog

The European hedgehog has a generalised body structure with unspecialised limb girdles. It appears brownish with most of its body covered by up to 6000 brown and white spines. The length of head and body is ~160 mm (6 in) at weaning, increasing to 260 mm (10 in) or more in large adults. It has an extremely short tail as an almost vestigial feature, typically 20 to 30 mm (0.8 to 1.2 in). Weight increases from around 120 g (4 oz) at weaning to > 1100 g (40 oz) in adulthood. The maximum recorded weight is 2000 g (70 oz), though few wild specimens exceed 1600 g (55 oz) even in autumn. Adult summer weight is typically somewhat less than in autumn, with an average of around 800 g (28 oz) and adult weights commonly as low as 500 g (18 oz). Males tend to be slightly larger than females, but sex differences in body weight are overshadowed by enormous seasonal variation.

The European hedgehog is unlike any other creature across most of its range. Where it coexists with the northern white-breasted hedgehog (Erinaceus roumanicus), the two species are difficult to distinguish in the field, the latter having a white spot on its chest. It is probably the largest hedgehog species and is possibly the heaviest member of the order Erinaceomorpha.

=== Colour variation ===
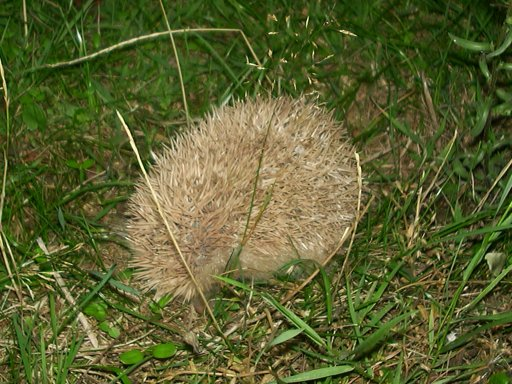
Blonde hedgehog

Leucistic or 'blonde' hedgehogs occasionally occur. Such specimens are believed to have a pair of rare recessive genes, giving rise to their black eyes and creamy-coloured spines; however they are not strictly speaking albino. They are extremely rare, except on North Ronaldsay and the Channel Island of Alderney, where around 25% of the population is thought to be blonde. True albino morphs of the hedgehog occur infrequently.

== Behaviour and ecology ==
European hedgehog anointing itself

The European hedgehog is largely nocturnal. It has a hesitant gait, frequently stopping to smell the air. Unlike the smaller, warmer-climate species, the European hedgehog may hibernate in the winter. However most wake at least once to move their nests.

=== Diet ===
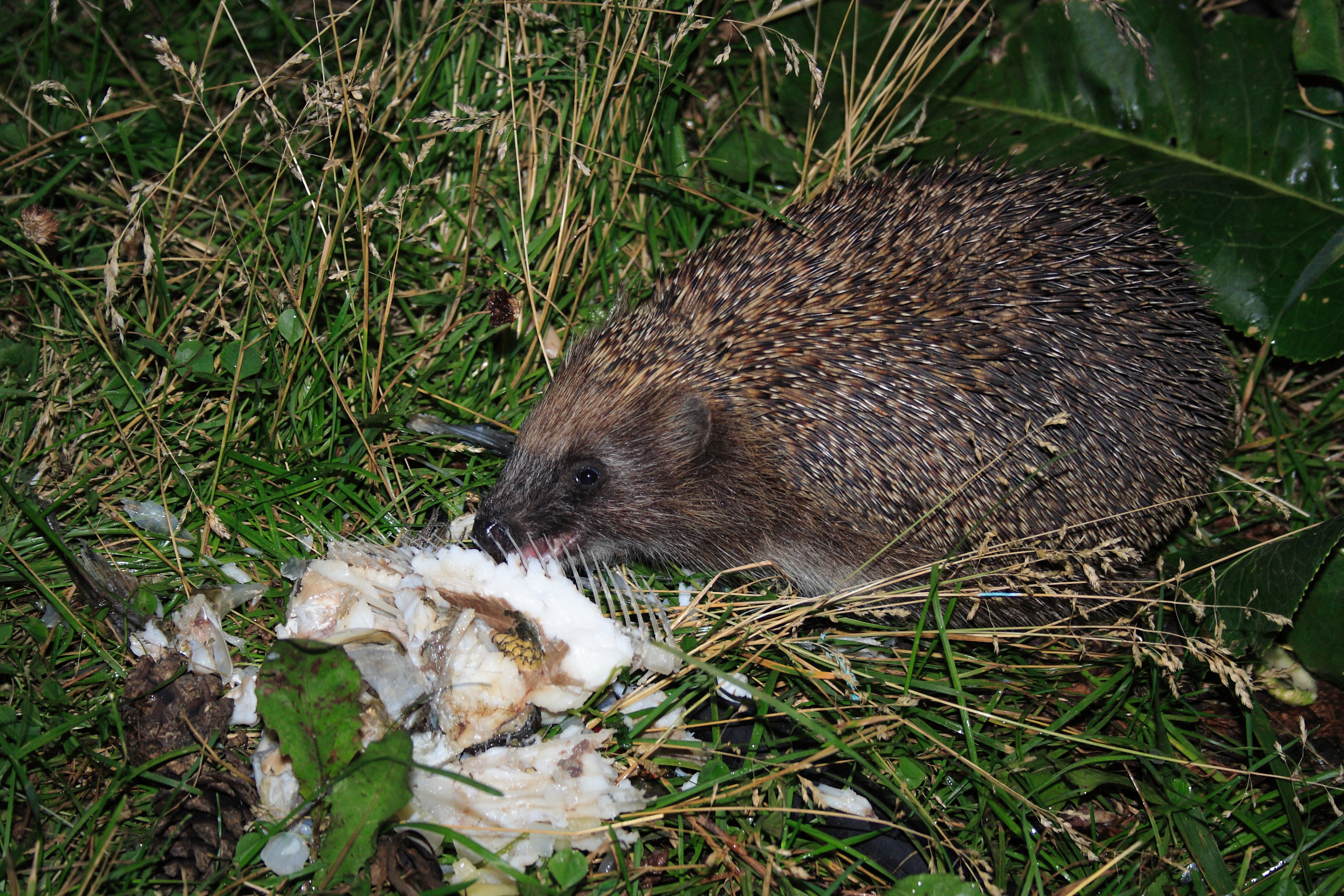
A European hedgehog eating fish carcass, photographed in Altai Krai

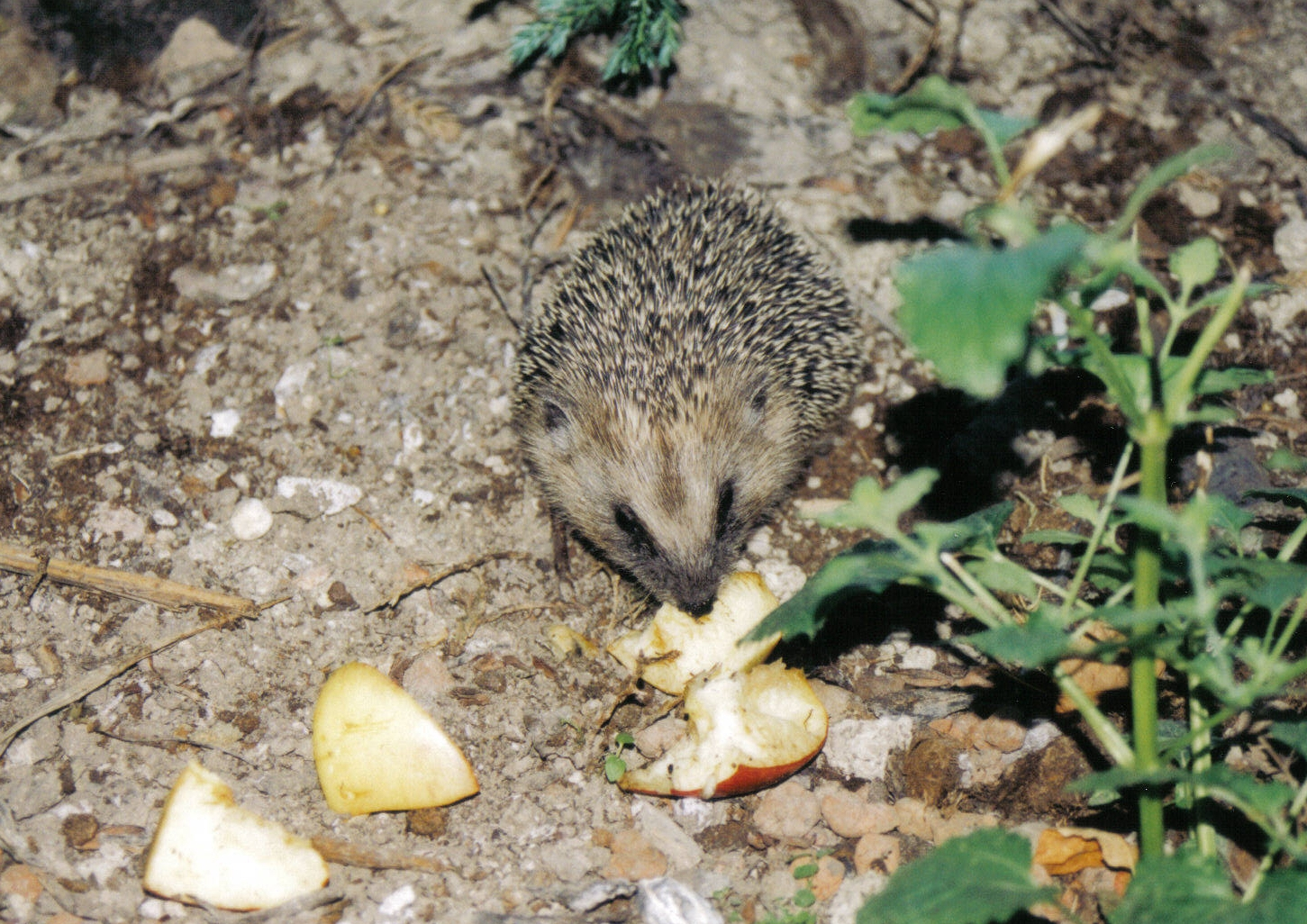
A European hedgehog eating fallen fruits

European hedgehog foraging in hedgerow

The European hedgehog is an insectivore. Its diet consists largely of earthworms, as well as snails and slugs, beetles, ants, bees and wasps, earwigs, cockroaches, crickets and grasshoppers, butterflies and moths, and caterpillars and other insect larvae. Eggs of ground-nesting birds are also taken and carcasses may be foraged on. Hedgehogs may also eat lizards, snakes, frogs and small rodents. Plant matter appears to make up only a negligible part of the hedgehog's diet.

=== Breeding ===
The breeding season commences after hibernation. Pregnancies peak between May and July, though they have been recorded as late as September. Gestation is 31 to 35 days. The female alone raises the litter, which typically numbers between four and six, though the range is from two to ten. Studies have indicated that litter size may increase in more northern climes. The young are born blind with a covering of small spines. By the time they are 36 hours old the second, outer coat of spines begins to sprout. By 11 days they can roll into a ball. Weaning occurs at around six weeks of age.

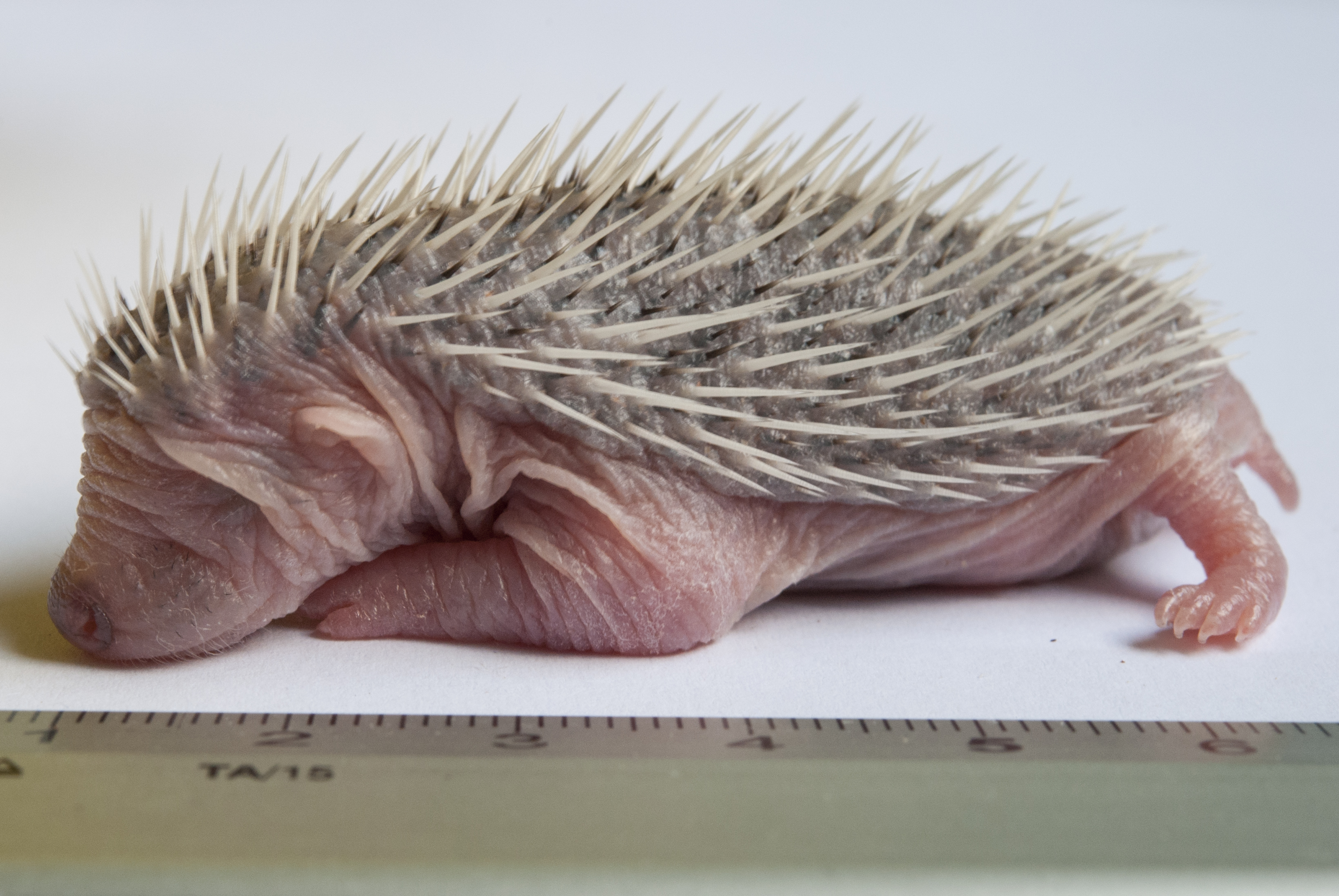
A one-day-old newborn European hedgehog

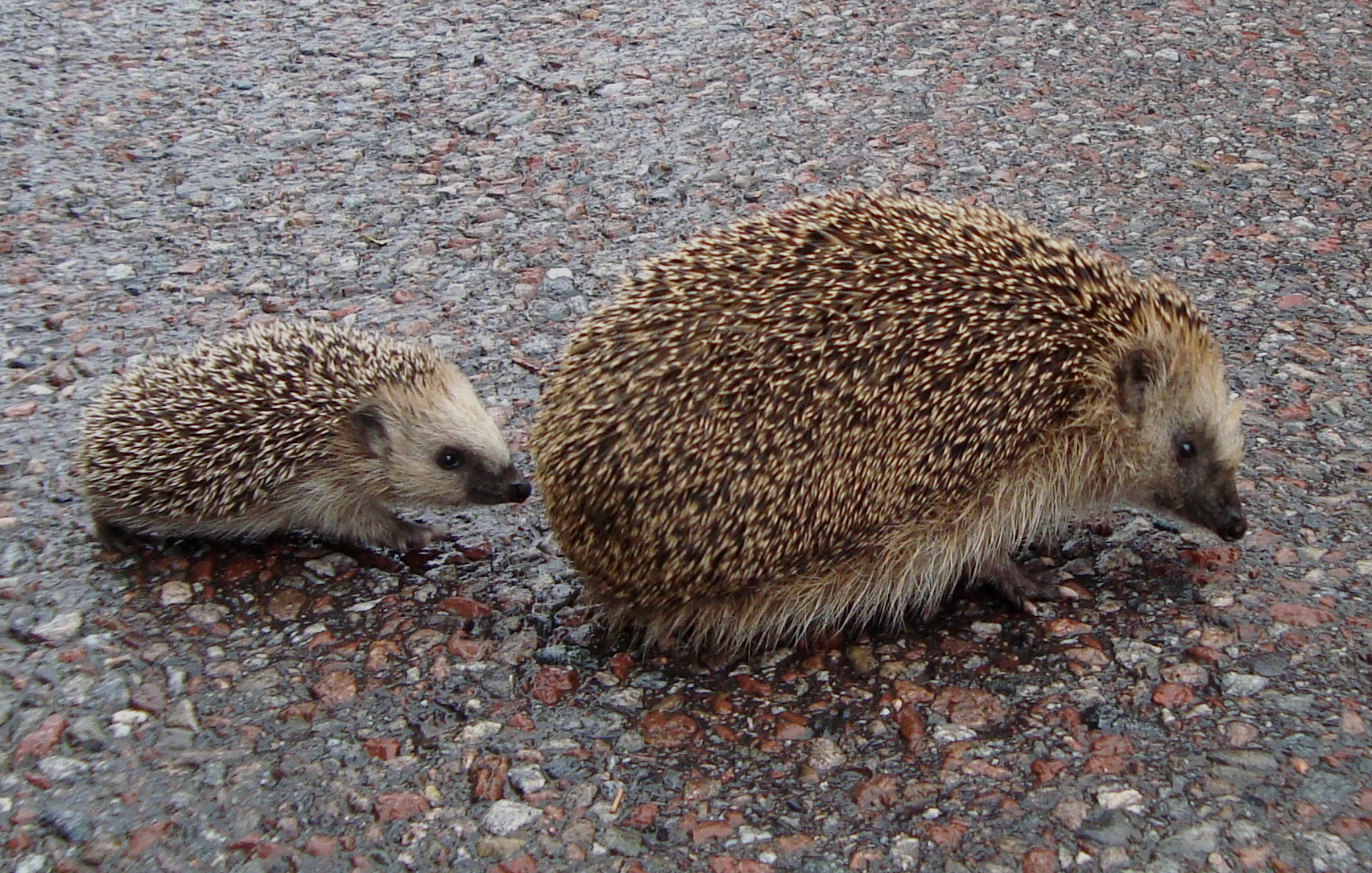
A female with one young

=== Longevity and mortality ===
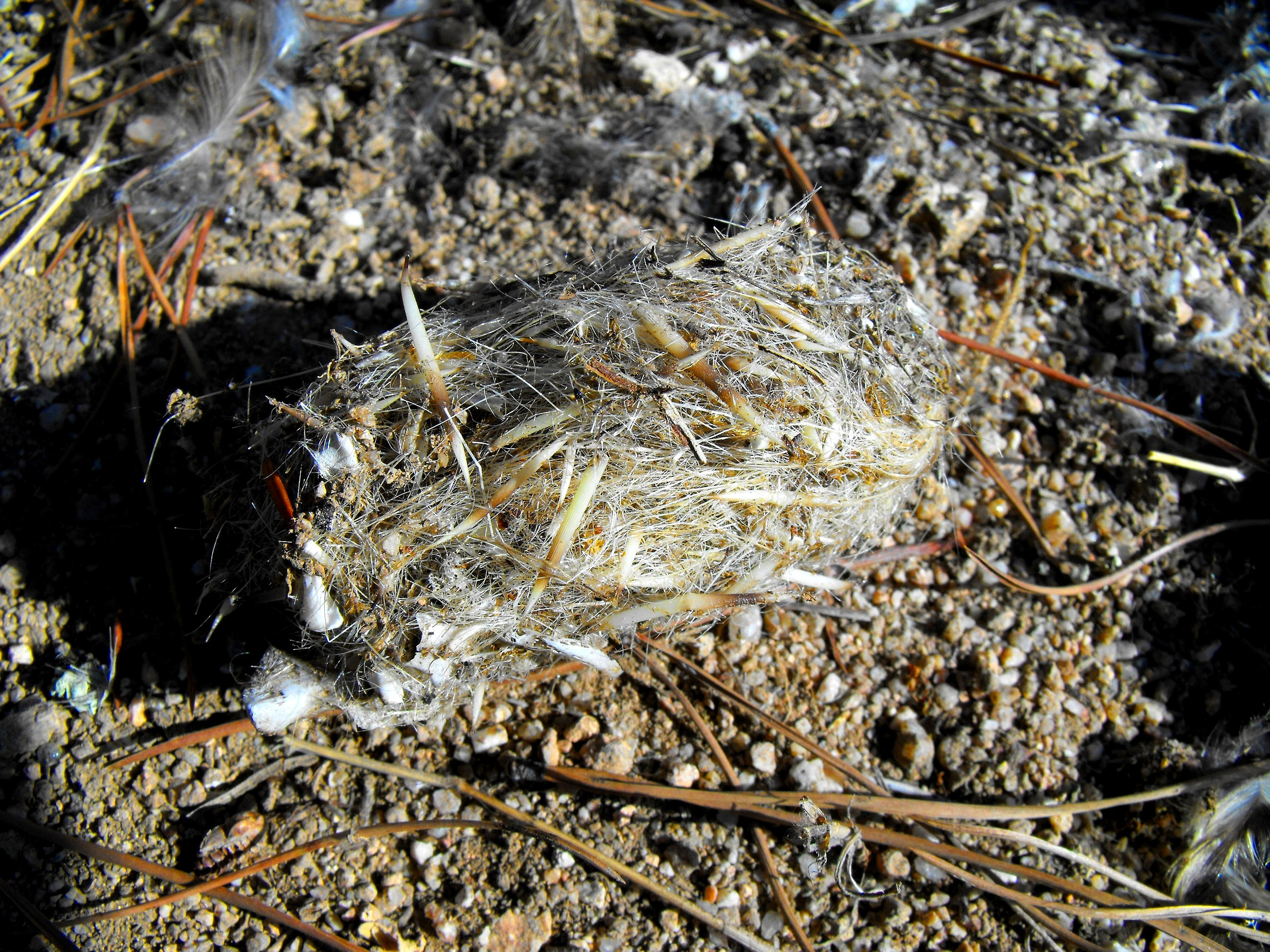
A pellet made by owl, with hair and spikes of hedgehog

European hedgehogs may live to more than ten years of age, although the average life expectancy is three years. Starvation is the most common cause of death, usually occurring during hibernation. If alarmed, the animal will roll into a ball to protect itself. Many potential predators are repelled by its spines, but predation does occur. Remains of hedgehogs have been found in the stomachs of red foxes (Vulpes vulpes), European badgers (Meles meles) and pine martens (Martes martes). A large portion of these may be from hedgehog carcasses, especially roadkill. However hedgehogs tend to be absent from areas where badgers are numerous.

Eurasian eagle-owls (Bubo bubo) and golden eagles (Aquila chrysaetos) are the only regular avian predators of this species and may even prefer them as prey. The owl, after grabbing the hedgehog by its face, tends to skin the mammal's prickly back with its talons before consumption, resulting in several hedgehog backs being found around eagle-owl roosts and nests. In Spain, reduction of European rabbit (Oryctolagus cuniculus) numbers due to rabbit haemorrhagic disease has made the European hedgehog one of the top preferred prey species for eagle-owls. Elsewhere, eagle-owls often prefer these hedgehogs to any other prey species, as the hedgehog can comprise up to 23% by number and 30.7% by biomass of eagle-owl prey remains. On the Swedish island of Gotland the golden eagle may take larger numbers of hedgehogs than any other prey owing to an otherwise low diversity of native land mammals, although the introduction of European rabbits has shifted the eagle's prey preferences there.

=== Nesting ===
European hedgehogs form nests where they spend much of their time. They construct three types of nest: breeding nests for birth and for protection of litters, day nests, which are used during the summer months, and winter nests or hibernacula, which are used for longer periods during winter months. Nests are often found under structures that can support them, such as roots or branches.

== Distribution and habitat ==
The European hedgehog is native to Europe, with a global distribution extending from Ireland and the Iberian Peninsula eastwards through much of western to central Europe, and from southern Fennoscandia and the northern Baltic to north-west Russia. It is present also on Mediterranean islands (Corsica, Sardinia, Elba, Sicily), on most of the French Atlantic islands as well as on Irish and British islands (autochthonous and introduced). It is an invasive exotic species in New Zealand and it has been suggested maybe to have been introduced to Ireland and many of the smaller islands where it occurs.

Colonists took hedgehogs from England and Scotland to New Zealand on sailing ships from the 1860s to the 1890s, mainly as a biological control against agricultural pests or as a pet. Few survived the c. 50–100 days' voyage, but those that did had lost all their fleas. Animals found their first homes in the South Island, where their spread was helped by guards dropping them off at country railway stations. Hedgehogs were introduced to the North Island in the 1890s, but some were also transported from South Island between 1906 and 1911 and from then on their numbers increased at an exponential rate. By the 1920s they had become so numerous that game-bird hunters blamed them for reduced bag sizes. Hedgehogs were declared noxious animals and a bounty of one shilling a snout was paid by regional authorities for several years. By the 1950s hedgehogs could be found over the whole country with the exception of the coldest wettest corner of the South Island and alpine areas of permanent snow. Nevertheless hedgehogs have been seen climbing New Zealand glaciers. Hedgehogs do not reach the same weight in New Zealand as in colder parts of Europe. With the milder winters New Zealand hedgehogs hibernate for only three months of the year so do not need to put on so much weight in autumn as their ancestors. In northern New Zealand many hedgehogs do not hibernate at all. One of New Zealand's pioneer hedgehogs probably had faulty teeth for this feature is found in about 50% of today's animals. Most New Zealanders welcome hedgehogs in their gardens since they relish slugs and snails. Conservationists are less happy, since hedgehogs compete for invertebrate food with native bush birds and prey on some rare insects, lizards and ground-nesting birds. As a result extensive hedgehog-control schemes are under way in some parts of the country, killing thousands of them. To judge by roadkill counts, North Island hedgehog numbers were at their highest in the 1950s. Since then, roadkill counts have fallen dramatically from about 50/100 km to less than 1/100 km.

The European hedgehog is found across a wide range of habitat types, encompassing both semi-natural vegetation types and those areas that have been heavily modified by man. The range includes woodland, grasslands such as meadows and pasture, arable land, orchards and vineyards as well as within the matrix of habitat types found in human settlements. It prefers lowlands and hills up to 600m but is also locally present on mountains, exceptionally up to an altitude of 2000m (e.g. Alps and Pyrenees). Outside cultivated land it prefers marginal zones of forests, particularly ecotonal grass and scrub vegetation.

Hedgehogs are most abundant within the gardens, parks and amenity land close to or within human settlements. They are generally scarce in areas of marshes and moorland, probably because of a lack of suitable sites and materials for the construction of winter nests (or hibernacula), which have specific requirements. In Finland they use pine-tree roots especially for nests in the winter.

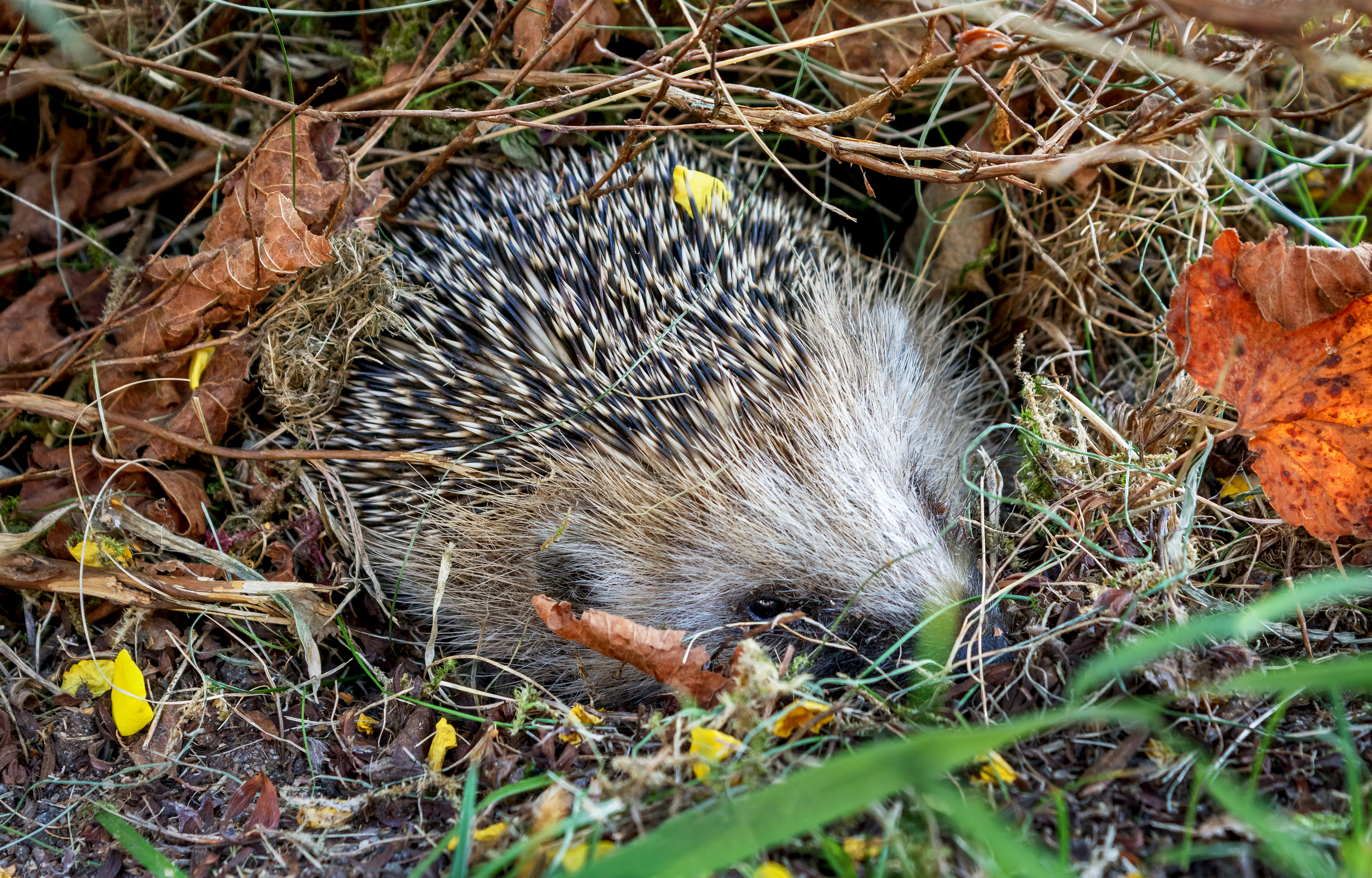
In autumn in its nest under a bush in Brastad, Sweden

== Conservation ==
Generally the hedgehog is widely distributed and can be found in good numbers where people are tolerant of their residence in gardens. The IUCN classifies the species as Near Threatened and currently the population as Stable. In some areas they are common victims of road kills and may be hunted by dogs, such as in Sardinia. On 28 August 2007, the new Biodiversity Action Plan included the European hedgehog on the list of species and habitats in Britain that need conservation and greater protection.

In Denmark and Poland the European hedgehog is protected by law. It is illegal to capture or hurt them, but rehabilitation of unhealthy hedgehogs is accepted. It is protected in all European countries that have signed the Berne Convention on the Conservation of European Wildlife and Natural Habitats.

A low coverage assembly of the genome of Erinaceus europaeus was released by the Broad Institute in June 2006 as part of the Mammalian Genome Project.

== Status in Great Britain ==
=== Population size ===
An estimate of 36.5 million by Burton was based on extrapolating from a density of 2.5 animals/ha (one per acre), but this was based on limited data and is probably an overestimate. A more recent estimate of 1,550,000 in Great Britain (England 1,100,000, Scotland 310,000, Wales 140,000) is more reliable but still has a high degree of uncertainty since it is based on very limited information about hedgehog density estimates for different habitat types. Given this figure, and more firmly established rates of decline, it is now thought likely that there are fewer than a million hedgehogs in Great Britain. In the UK badgers are the main predator of hedgehogs and also compete for some of the same foods.

=== Population status ===
In 2007 the hedgehog was classified a Biodiversity Action Plan priority species in Britain, largely in response to negative trends identified in national surveys such as Mammals on Roads survey, run by People's Trust for Endangered Species (PTES), which found an annual decline in counts of road casualties of around 7% from 2001 to 2004. Historic data from the National Gamebag Census suggest a steady decline between 1960 and 1980. Evidence from a questionnaire in 2005 and 2006 also supported an ongoing decline, with almost half of ~20,000 participants in PTES' Hogwatch survey reporting the impression that there were fewer hedgehogs than there had been five years earlier.

A review of the available survey data for the population trend of the hedgehog in Britain was undertaken by the British Trust for Ornithology (BTO) in a report commissioned by PTES and the British Hedgehog Preservation Society (BHPS). This concluded that, at a conservative estimate, 25% of the British hedgehog population had been lost in a decade. The report also highlighted the importance of long-term monitoring to provide datasets with sufficient power to allow the changes to the population to be identified. Currently, the most important monitoring programmes involved in collecting information about the status of the British hedgehog population are PTES' Mammals on Roads and Living with Mammals surveys, and the BTO Breeding Bird Survey and Garden BirdWatch survey. A recent review of these surveys now suggests that rural populations have declined by at least a half and urban populations by up to a third since 2000.

A 2026 survey conducted by Censuswide on behalf of Dino Decking found that, among the UK garden owners surveyed, 41% had never seen a hedgehog in their garden and 12% had not seen one for more than a year.

== Pest status ==
This species has become a serious pest in areas where it has been introduced outside of its native range. One such location is the Western Isles of Scotland, where introduced hedgehogs eat the eggs of ground-nesting waders, such as common snipe, dunlin, common redshank and northern lapwing. It is also considered a pest in New Zealand, where it preys upon various native fauna, including insects, snails, lizards and ground-nesting birds, particularly shore birds. As with many introduced animals, it lacks natural predators.

Attempts to eliminate hedgehogs from bird colonies on the Scottish islands of North Uist and Benbecula in the Outer Hebrides were met with international outrage. Eradication began in 2003 with 690 hedgehogs being killed. Animal-welfare groups attempted rescues to save the hedgehogs. By 2007 legal injunctions against the killing of hedgehogs were put in place. In 2008 the elimination process was changed from killing the hedgehogs to trapping them and releasing them on the mainland.

== In popular culture ==
- From the early 1950s until the 1980s, the hedgehog was sometimes seen as an unofficial symbol of NATO in numerous countries, as it represented a peaceful animal that bristles in defence.

== See also ==
- Hedgehog Street
- Hedgehogs in New Zealand
