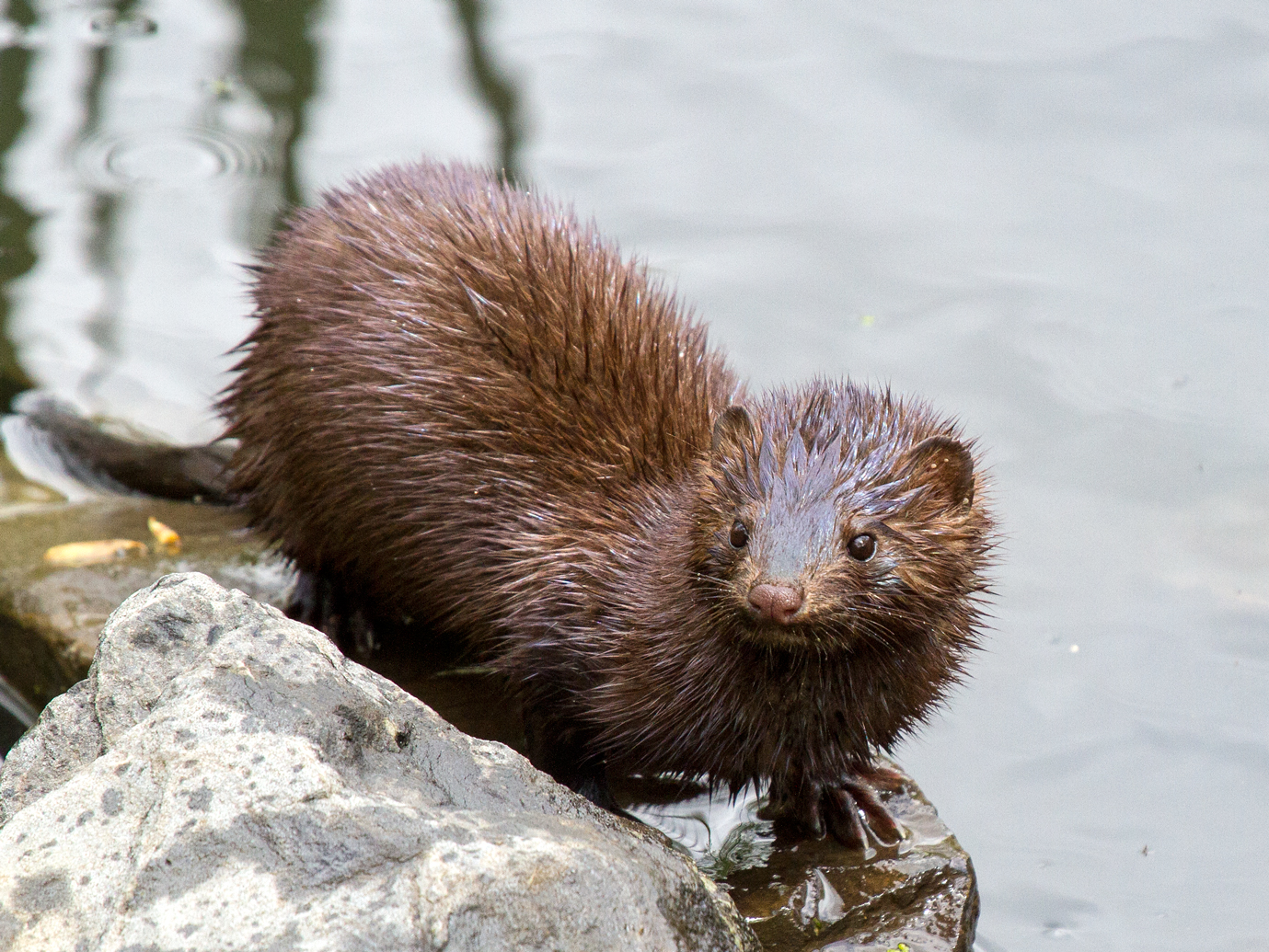
- American mink

Scientific classification
- Kingdom: Animalia
- Phylum: Chordata
- Class: Mammalia
- Order: Carnivora
- Family: Mustelidae
- Subfamily: Mustelinae; G. Fischer de Waldheim, 1817

Genera
- †Dinogale; †Lartetictis; †Legionarictis; Mustela; Neogale; †Tisisthenes
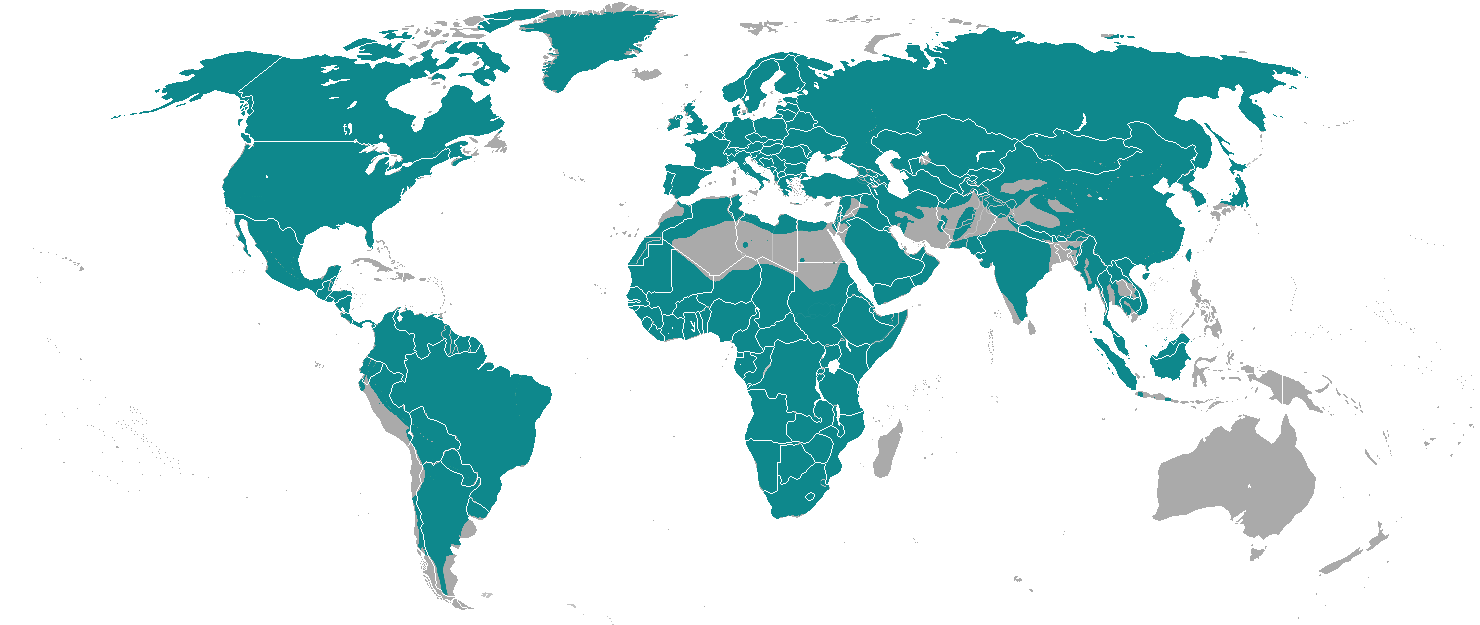
- Mustelinae range

= Mustelinae =

Subfamily of carnivores

Mustelinae is a subfamily of family Mustelidae, including weasels, ferrets, and minks.

It was formerly defined in a paraphyletic manner to also include wolverines, martens, and many other mustelids, to the exclusion of the otters (Lutrinae).

== Extant species of Mustelinae ==
Subfamily Mustelinae

Image	Genus	Living species
	Mustela Linnaeus, 1758 (weasels, ferrets, European mink and stoats)	Mountain weasel, Mustela altaica; Stoat or ermine, Mustela erminea; Steppe polecat, Mustela eversmannii; Domestic ferret, Mustela furo; Haida ermine, Mustela haidarum; Japanese weasel, Mustela itatsi; Yellow-bellied weasel, Mustela kathiah; European mink, Mustela lutreola; Indonesian mountain weasel, Mustela lutreolina; Mustela mopbie; Black-footed ferret, Mustela nigripes; Least weasel, Mustela nivalis; Malayan weasel, Mustela nudipes; European polecat, Mustela putorius; American ermine, Mustela richardsonii; Siberian weasel, Mustela sibirica; Back-striped weasel, Mustela strigidorsa
	Neogale Gray, 1865 (New World weasels and mink)	Amazon weasel, Neogale africana; Colombian weasel, Neogale felipei; Long-tailed weasel, Neogale frenata; American mink, Neogale vison

The sea mink (Neogale macrodon) is a recently extinct species from the 19th century that was native to the Maritime Provinces of Canada and New England in the United States.

== Importance for humans ==
The furs of several members of this subfamily, including weasel, ermine, mink, and polecat, are used in fashion.

Domestic ferrets are fairly common pets.

=== Ferret model of COVID-19 ===
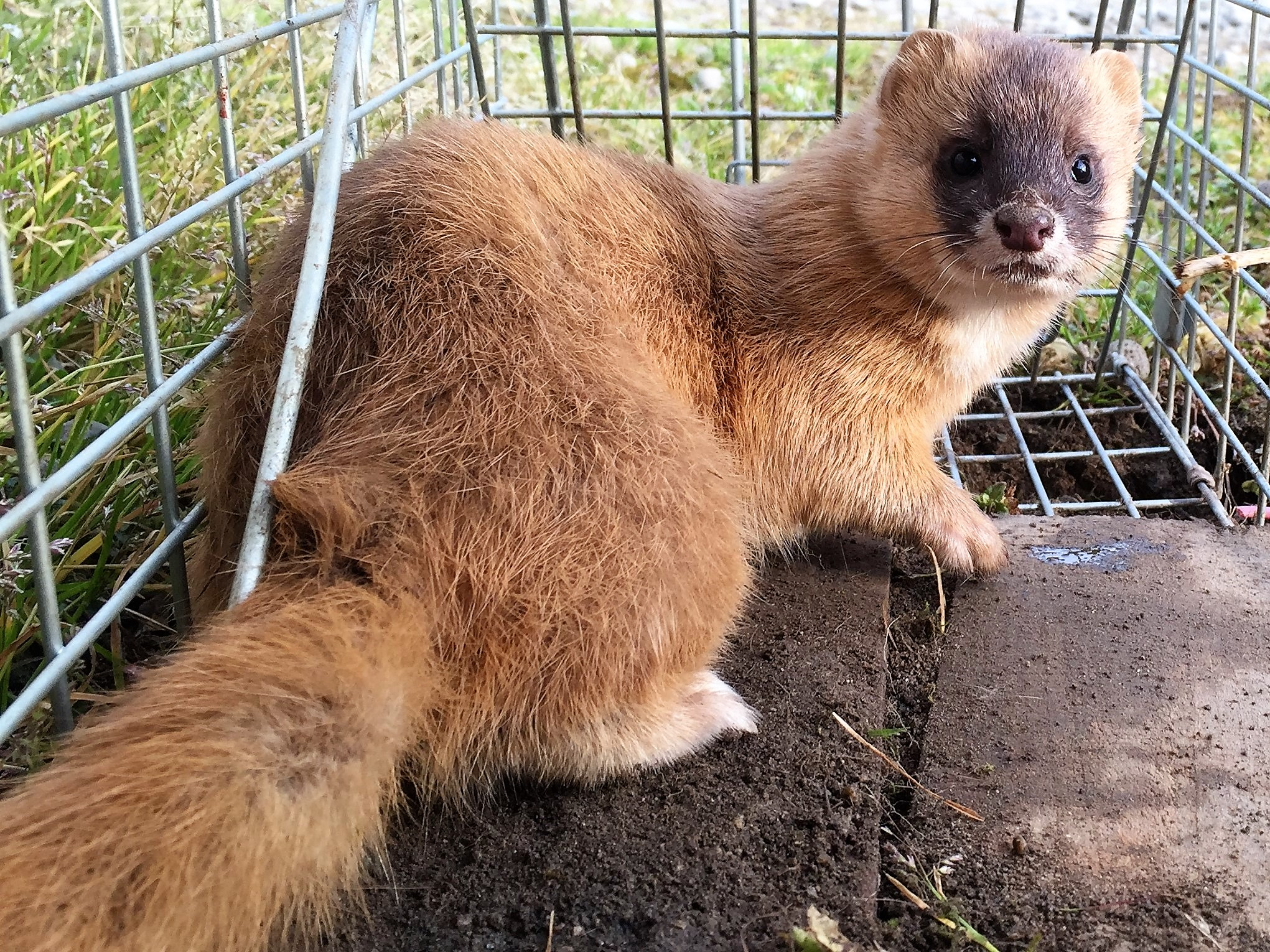
Mustela sibirica

COVID-19 can infect both the European mink (Mustela lutreola) and the American mink (Neogale vison). Ferrets are used to study COVID-19. Ferrets get some of the same symptoms as humans, but they get less sick than farmed mink. Ferrets are a fairly uncommon animal to use as a model, but mice were not an easy model of COVID-19 because mice lack the ACE2 gene.
