= Mustela mopbie =

Mustela mopbie Temporal range: Recent

Scientific classification
- Kingdom: Animalia
- Phylum: Chordata
- Class: Mammalia
- Order: Carnivora
- Family: Mustelidae
- Genus: Mustela
- Species: M. mopbie

Binomial name
- Mustela mopbie Wei et al., 2025

Species of weasel from southwestern China

Mustela mopbie is a species of weasel found in the Hengduan Mountains in Sichuan Province in southwestern China. It was first described in 2025. Compared to other Asian weasels, it has an unusually slim profile, with a shorter body and tail, a lighter frame, and a narrower head. This allows it to enter tight crevices and burrows to catch insects and small rodents. It also has a distinct coloration and fur pattern.

== Taxonomy and evolution ==
The morphology of Mustela mopbie is most similar to those of the least weasel Mustela nivalis, the yellow-bellied weasel Mustela kathiah, and the Sichuan weasel Mustela aistoodonnivalis. Data from sequencing the complete mitochondrial genomes and large sets of nuclear genomes from the three M. mopbie specimens collected indicates that it is most closely related to the least weasel and the mountain weasel Mustela altaica. There are notable discrepancies between the mitochondrial DNA and what has been found in the nuclear DNA, suggesting a degree of introgression from interbreeding with closely related weasel species. The researchers who discovered M. mopbie believe that the discovery of this new species provides insight into speciation within the genus Mustela and how small carnivores adapt to different environments through genetic variation.

== Distribution and habitat ==
The extent of the range of Mustela mopbie is unclear, as the only documented specimens are the three that were initially captured in July and August 2024 in Dafengding Nature Reserve for study. From this, it can be surmised that it inhabits the montane forests of the Hengduan Mountains.

== Behaviour and ecology ==
=== Diet ===
Mustela mopbie primarily eats insects and small rodents. Its short, thin body allows it to slip into crevices and burrows inaccessible to most other predators in pursuit of its prey.

=== Predators and competitors ===
M. mopbie is believed to be preyed upon by raptors and larger carnivorous mammals.

=== Potential role as an indicator species ===
Small carnivores such as M. mopbie are often useful as indicator species; they tend to reproduce quickly and live within small home ranges, allowing the species to respond quickly to changes in environmental factors such as prey population, forest structure, and human activity. Because the species lives in an ecosystem that may be particularly vulnerable to climate change and inhabits rocky slopes and burrows where pollutants can accumulate, studying the genetics and population size of M. mopbie over time may be helpful in understanding how smaller predators in the region adapt to rising temperatures and changing land use. Its position as an intermediate link in the food web between primary consumers and apex predators also provides an additional data point for studying the flow of energy and contaminants within its ecosystem.

== See also ==
- List of living mammal species described in the 2020s
