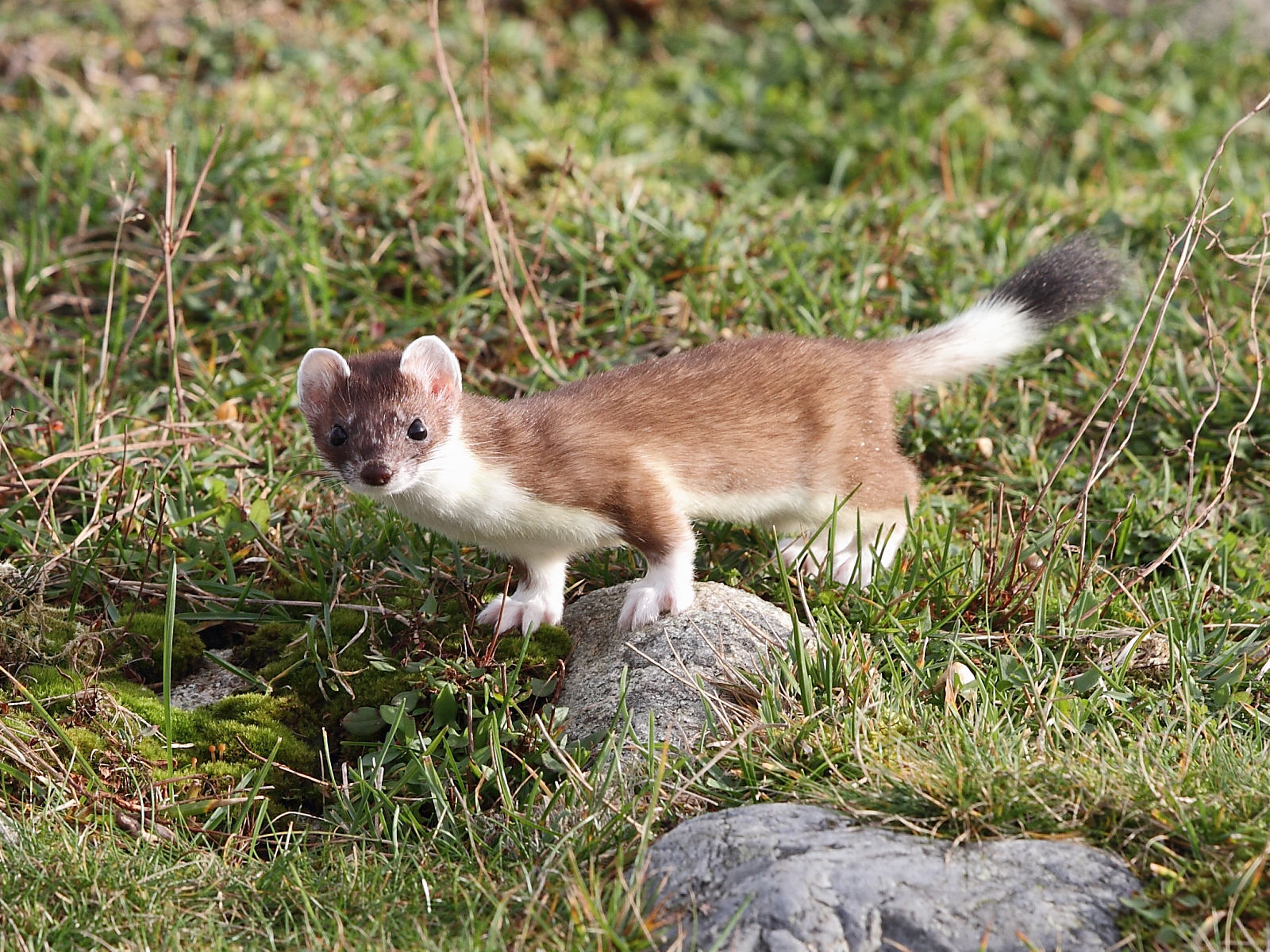
- M. e. erminea, Steinodden, Lista, Norway

Conservation status
- Least Concern (IUCN 3.1)

Scientific classification
- Kingdom: Animalia
- Phylum: Chordata
- Class: Mammalia
- Order: Carnivora
- Family: Mustelidae
- Genus: Mustela
- Species: M. erminea

Binomial name
- Mustela erminea Linnaeus, 1758
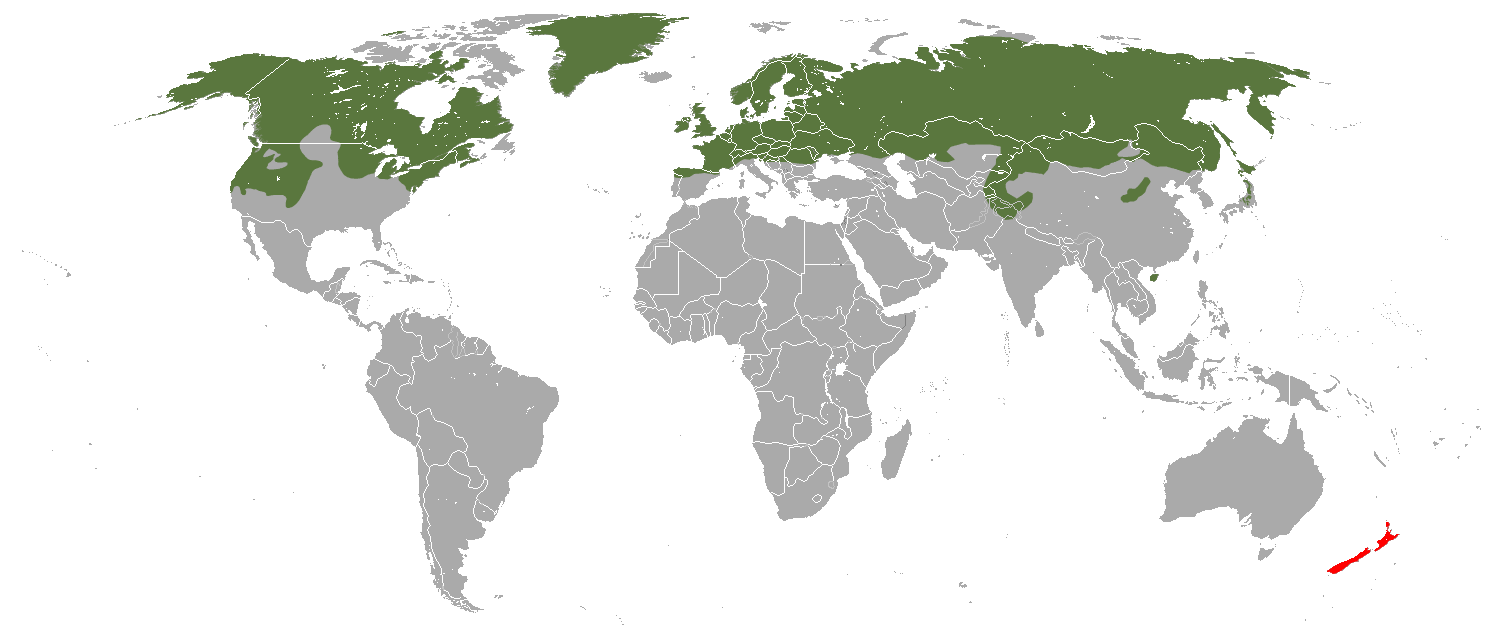
- Stoat range (includes M. richardsonii and M. haidarum) native introduced

= Stoat =

Species of mammal

The stoat (Mustela erminea), also known as the Eurasian ermine or ermine, is a species of mustelid native to Eurasia and the northern regions of North America. Because of its wide circumpolar distribution, it is listed as Least Concern on the IUCN Red List. The name ermine (/ˈɜːrmɪn/) is used especially in its pure white winter coat of the stoat or its fur. Ermine fur was used in the 15th century by Catholic monarchs, who sometimes used it as the mozzetta cape. It has long been used on the ceremonial robes of members of the United Kingdom House of Lords. It was also used in capes on images such as the Infant Jesus of Prague.

The stoat was introduced into New Zealand in the late 19th century to control rabbits. However, they have had a devastating effect on native bird populations; as such, the species was nominated as one of the world's top 100 "worst invaders".

== Etymology ==
The root word for "stoat" is likely either the Dutch word stout ("bold") or the Gothic word 𐍃𐍄𐌰𐌿𐍄𐌰𐌽 (stautan, "to push"). According to John Guillim, in his Display of Heraldrie, the word "ermine" is likely derived from Armenia, the nation where it was thought the species originated, though other authors have linked it to the Norman French from the Teutonic harmin (Anglo-Saxon hearma). This seems to come from the Lithuanian word šarmu. In North America it is called a short-tailed weasel. A male stoat is called a dog, hob, or jack, while a female is called a jill. The collective noun for stoats is either gang or pack.

== Taxonomy ==
Formerly considered a single species with a very wide circumpolar range, a 2021 study split M. erminea into three species: M. erminea sensu stricto (Eurasia and Alaska), M. richardsonii (most of North America), and M. haidarum (several islands off the Pacific Northwest coast).

=== Subspecies ===
As of 2021, 21 subspecies are recognized.

Image	Subspecies	Common name	Description	Range	Synonyms
	M. e. erminea Linnaeus, 1758 (Nominate subspecies)	Northern stoat	Small-to-medium-sized with a relatively short and broad facial region	The Kola Peninsula, Scandinavia	hyberna (Kerr, 1792) maculata (Billberg, 1827)
	M. e. aestiva Kerr, 1792	Middle Russian stoat	Moderately sized with dark, tawny or chestnut summer fur	European Russia (except for the Kola Peninsula), Central and Western Europe	algiricus (Thomas, 1895) alpestris (Burg, 1920) giganteus (Burg, 1920) major (Nilsson, 1820)
	M. e. arctica Merriam, 1826	Tundra stoat	Large, with a dark yellowish-brown summer coat, a deep yellow underbelly and a massive skull; it resembles the Eurasian stoat subspecies more closely than any other American stoat subspecies	Alaska, northwestern Canada, and the Arctic Archipelago (except for Baffin Island)	audax (Barrett-Hamilton, 1904) kadiacensis (Merriam, 1896) kadiacensis (Osgood, 1901) richardsonii (Bonaparte, 1838)
	M. e. augustidens Brown, 1908				
	M. e. ferghanae Thomas, 1895	Fergana stoat	Small; very light, straw-brownish or greyish coat, which is short and soft. Light spots on the neck, sometimes forming a collar. It does not turn white in winter.	Tien Shan and Pamir-Alay mountains, Afghanistan, India, western Tibet and the adjacent parts of the Tien Shan in China	shnitnikovi (Ognev, 1935) whiteheadi (Wroughton, 1908)
	M. e. hibernica Thomas and Barrett-Hamilton, 1895	Irish stoat	Larger than aestiva, but smaller than stabilis. Distinguished by the irregular pattern on the dividing line between the dark and pale fur on the flanks, though 13.5% of Irish stoats exhibit the more typical straight dividing line. They do not turn white in winter.	Ireland and Isle of Man	
	M. e. kadiacensis Merriam, 1896	Kodiak stoat		Kodiak Island	
	M. e. kaneii Baird, 1857	East Siberian stoat (known locally as Ezo stoat in Japan)	Moderately sized, it is smaller than M. e. tobolica, with close similarities to M. e. arctica. The summer coat is relatively light coloured, with varying intensities of browning-yellow tinges.	Eastern Siberia and the Russian Far East including Kamchatka, except the Amur Oblast and Ussuriland, Transbaikalia and the Sayan Mountains. Also in Hokkaidō.	baturini (Ognev, 1929) digna (Hall, 1944) kamtschatica (Dybowski, 1922) kanei (G. Allen, 1914) naumovi (Jurgenson, 1938) orientalis (Ognev, 1928) transbaikalica (Ognev, 1928)
	M. e. karaginensis Jurgenson, 1936	Karaginsky stoat	Very small, with a light chestnut-coloured summer coat	Karaginsky Island, along the eastern coast of Kamchatka	
	M. e. lymani Hollister, 1912	Altai stoat	Moderately sized with less dense fur than M. e. tobolica. The summer coat consists of weakly developed reddish-brown tones. The skull is similar to that of M. e. aestiva.	The mountains of southern Siberia eastwards to Baikal and the contiguous parts of Mongolia	
	M. e. martinoi Ellerman and Morrison-Scott, 1951				birulai (Martino and Martino, 1930)
	M. e. minima Cavazza, 1912	Swiss stoat		Switzerland	
	M. e. mongolica Ognev, 1928	Gobi stoat		The Govi-Altai Province	
	M. e. nippon Cabrera, 1913	Japanese stoat		northern Honshū	
	M. e. ognevi Jurgenson, 1932				
	M. e. polaris Barrett-Hamilton, 1904	Polar stoat		Greenland	
	M. e. ricinae Miller, 1907	Hebrides stoat		The Hebrides	
	M. e. salva Hall, 1944				
	M. e. stabilis Barrett-Hamilton, 1904	British stoat	Larger than mainland European stoats	Great Britain; introduced to New Zealand	
	M. e. teberdina Korneev, 1941	Caucasian stoat	Small, with a coffee to reddish-tawny summer coat	The northern slope of the middle part of the main Caucasus range	balkarica (Basiev, 1962)
	M. e. tobolica Ognev, 1923	Tobolsk stoat	Large; it is somewhat larger than aestiva, with long and dense fur.	Western Siberia, eastwards to the Yenisei and Altai Mountains and in Kazakhstan	

== Evolution ==
The stoat's direct ancestor was Mustela palerminea, a common carnivore in central and eastern Europe during the Middle Pleistocene, that spread to North America during the late Blancan or early Irvingtonian. The stoat is the product of a process that began 5–7 million years ago, when northern forests were replaced by open grassland, thus prompting an explosive evolution of small, burrowing rodents. The stoat's ancestors were larger than the current form, and underwent a reduction in size as they exploited the new food source. The stoat first arose in Eurasia, shortly after the long-tailed weasel, which is in a different genus (Neogale), arose as its mirror image in North America 2 million years ago. The stoat thrived during the Ice Age, as its small size and long body allowed it to easily operate beneath snow, as well as hunt in burrows. The stoat and the long-tailed weasel remained separated until 500,000 years ago, when falling sea levels exposed the Bering land bridge.

Fossilised stoat remains have been recovered from Denisova Cave. Combined phylogenetic analyses indicate the stoat's closest living relatives are the American ermine (M. richardsonii) and Haida ermine (M. haidarum), the latter of which partially descends from M. erminea. It is basal to most other members of Mustela, with only the yellow-bellied (M. kathia), Malayan (M. nudipes), and back-striped (M. strigidorsa) weasels being more basal. The mountain weasel (Mustela altaica) was formerly considered its closest relative although more recent analyses have found it to be significantly more derived. It was also previously thought to be allied with members of the genus Neogale such as the long-tailed weasel, but as those species have since been separated into a new genus, this is likely not the case.

== Description ==
=== Build ===
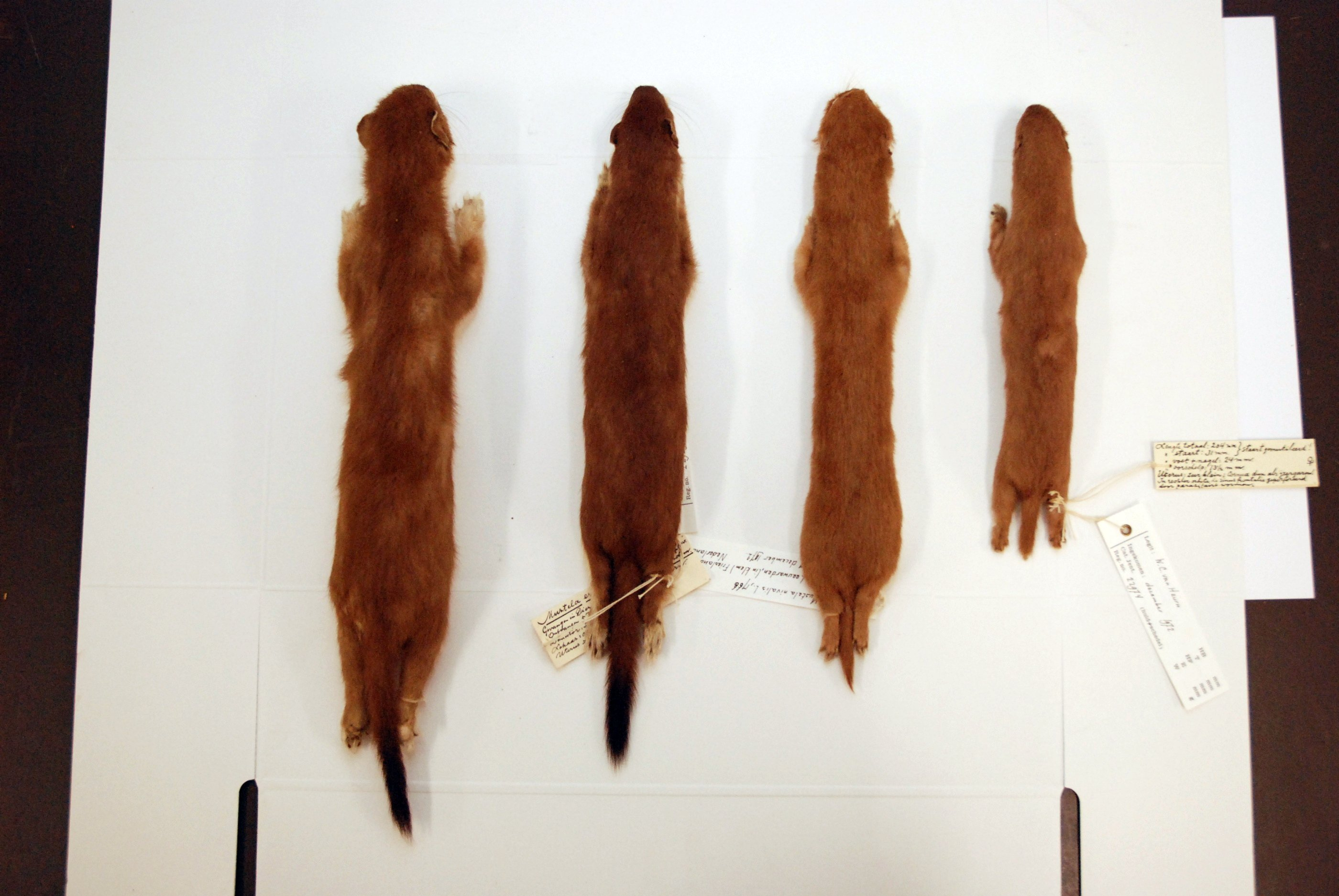
Stoat (left) and least weasel (right) pelts—note the stoat's larger size and black tail-tip

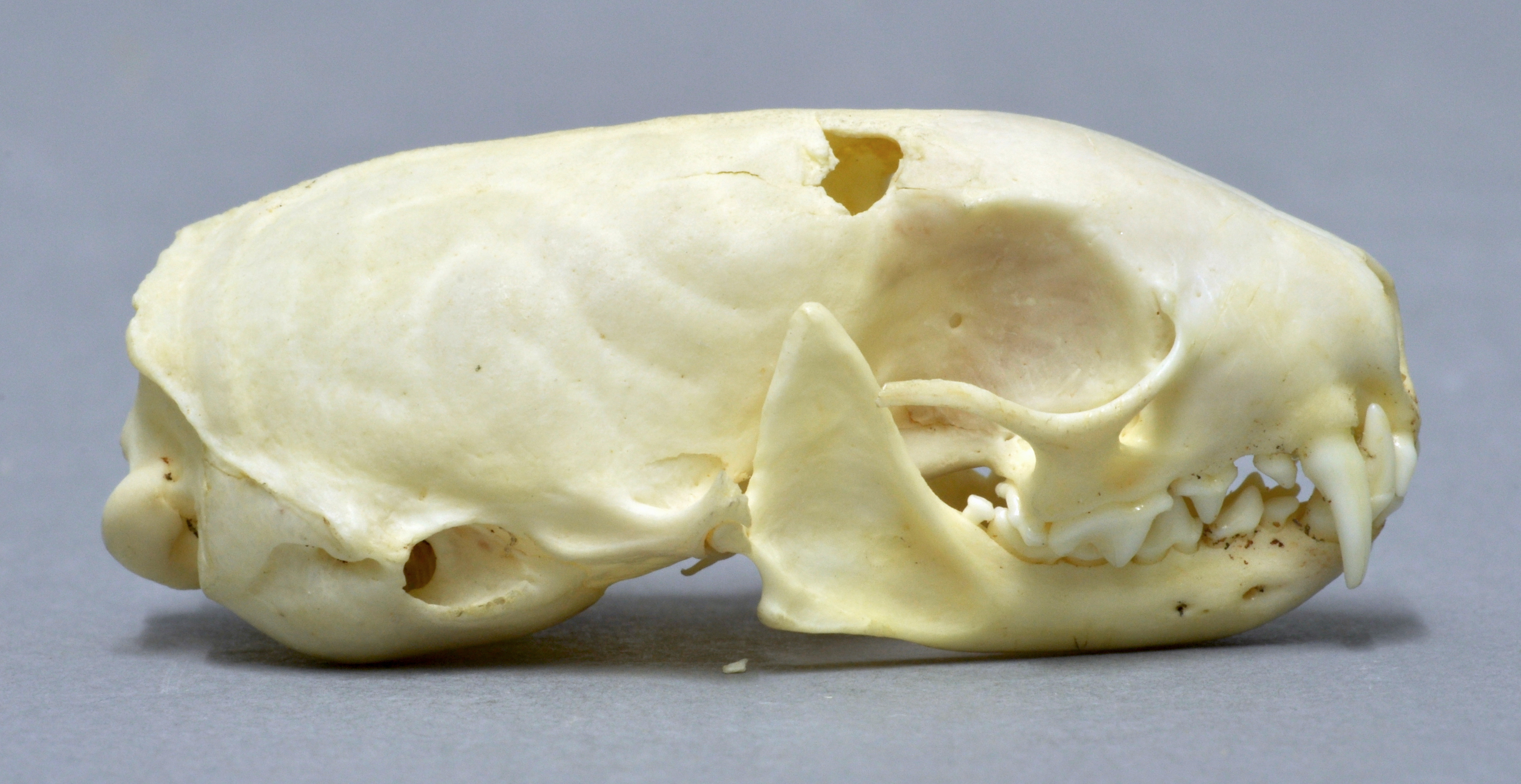
Skull

The stoat is similar to the least weasel in general proportions, manner of posture, and movement. However, a stoat's tail is relatively longer, and always exceeding a third of its body length. The stoat has an elongated neck, the head being set exceptionally far in front of the shoulders. The trunk is nearly cylindrical, and does not bulge at the abdomen. The greatest circumference of body is little more than half its length. The skull, although very similar to that of the least weasel, is relatively longer, with a narrower braincase. The projections of the skull and teeth are weakly developed, but stronger than those of the least weasel. The eyes are round, black and protrude slightly. The whiskers are brown or white in colour, and very long. The ears are short, rounded, and only protruding a tiny bit. The claws are not retractable, and are large in proportion to the digits. Each foot has five toes. The male stoat has a curved baculum with a proximal knob that increases in weight as it ages. Fat is deposited primarily along the spine and kidneys, then on gut mesenteries, under the limbs and around the shoulders. The stoat has four pairs of nipples, though they are visible only in females.

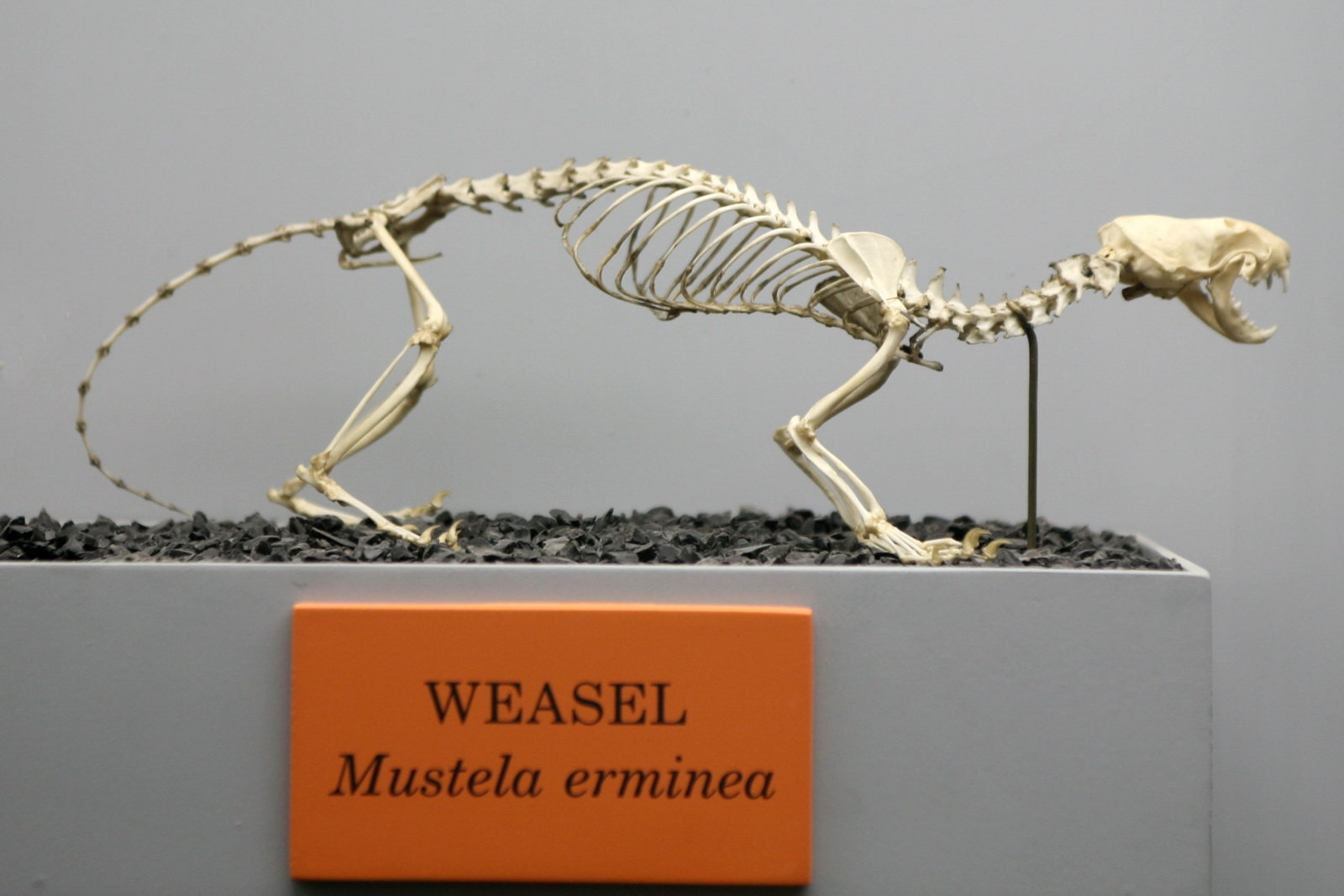
Skeleton

The dimensions of the stoat are variable, but not as significantly as the least weasel's. Unusual among the Carnivora, the size of stoats tends to decrease proportionally with latitude, in contradiction to Bergmann's rule. Sexual dimorphism in size is pronounced, with males being roughly 25% larger than females and 1.5–2.0 times their weight. On average, males measure 187–325 mm (7.4–12.8 in) in body length, while females measure 170–270 mm (6.7–10.6 in). The tail measures 75–120 mm (3.0–4.7 in) in males and 65–106 mm (2.6–4.2 in) in females. In males, the hind foot measures 40.0–48.2 mm (1.57–1.90 in), while in females it is 37.0–47.6 mm (1.46–1.87 in). The height of the ear measures 18.0–23.2 mm (0.71–0.91 in) in males and 14.0–23.3 mm (0.55–0.92 in). The skulls of males measure 39.3–52.2 mm (1.55–2.06 in) in length, while those of females measure 35.7–45.8 mm (1.41–1.80 in). Males average 258 g (9.1 oz) in weight, while females weigh less than 180 g (6.3 oz).

The stoat has large anal scent glands measuring 8.5 mm × 5 mm (0.33 in × 0.20 in) in males and smaller in females. Scent glands are also present on the cheeks, belly and flanks. Epidermal secretions, which are deposited during body rubbing, are chemically distinct from the products of the anal scent glands, which contain a higher proportion of volatile chemicals. When attacked or being aggressive, the stoat secretes the contents of its anal glands, giving rise to a strong, musky odour produced by several sulphuric compounds. The odour is distinct from that of least weasels.

=== Fur ===
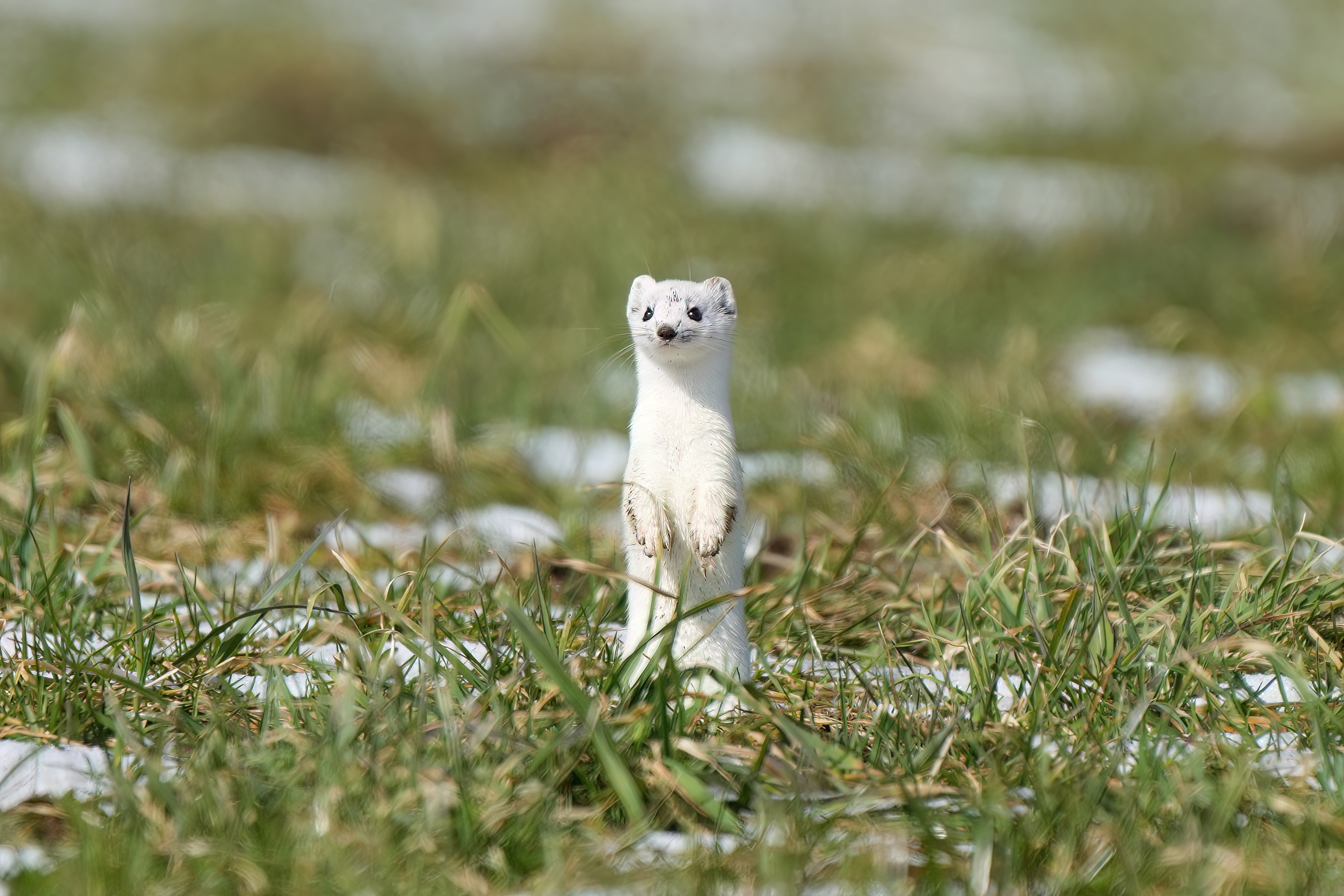
A stoat in winter fur

The winter fur is very dense and silky, but quite closely lying and short, while the summer fur is rougher, shorter and sparse. In summer, the fur is sandy-brown on the back and head and a white below. The division between the dark back and the light belly is usually straight, though this trait is only present in 13.5% of Irish stoats. The stoat moults twice a year. In spring, the moult is slow, starting from the forehead, across the back, toward the belly. In autumn, the moult is quicker, progressing in the reverse direction. The moult, initiated by photoperiod, starts earlier in autumn and later in spring at higher latitudes. In the stoat's northern range, it adopts a completely white coat (save for the black tail-tip) during the winter period. Differences in the winter and summer coats are less apparent in southern forms of the species. In the species' southern range, the coat remains brown, but is denser and sometimes paler than in summer.

== Distribution and habitat ==
The stoat has a circumboreal range throughout North America, Europe, and Asia. The stoat in Europe is found as far south as 41ºN in Portugal, and inhabits most islands with the exception of Iceland, Svalbard, the Mediterranean islands and some small North Atlantic islands. In Japan, it is present in central mountains (northern and central Japanese Alps) to northern part of Honshu (primarily above 1,200 m) and Hokkaido. Its vertical range is from sea level to 3,000 m (9,800 ft). In North America, it is found throughout Alaska and western Yukon to most of Arctic Canada east to Greenland. Throughout the rest of North America, as well as parts of Nunavut, including Baffin Island and some islands in southeast Alaska, it is replaced by M. richardsonii.

Stoats have been present in Orkney, north of Scotland, since 2010, where they are a predator of the Orkney vole and native bird populations. In 2018, a stoat eradication plan, the Orkney Native Wildlife Project, was applied across the archipelago. By 2024 the Orkney Native Wildlife Project had spent £7.9m trapping more than 6,300 stoats, and facilitating recovery in the islands' populations of Orkney voles, curlews, hen harriers and waders.

=== Introduction to New Zealand ===
Stoats were introduced into New Zealand during the late 19th century to control rabbits and hares, but are now a major threat to native bird populations. The introduction of stoats was opposed by scientists in New Zealand and Britain, including the New Zealand ornithologist Walter Buller. The warnings were ignored and stoats began to be introduced from Britain in the 1880s, resulting in a noticeable decline in bird populations within six years. Stoats are a serious threat to ground- and hole-nesting birds, since the latter have very few means of escaping predation. The highest rates of stoat predation occur after seasonal gluts in southern beechmast (beechnuts), which enable the reproduction of rodents on which stoats also feed, enabling stoats to increase their own numbers. For instance, the endangered South Island takahē's wild population dropped by a third between 2006 and 2007, after a stoat plague triggered by the 2005–06 mast wiped out more than half the takahē in untrapped areas.

== Behaviour and ecology ==
=== Reproduction and development ===
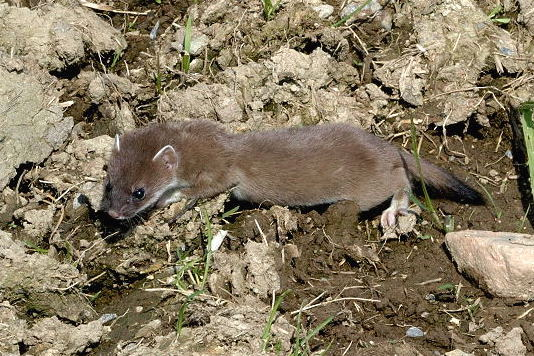
Young stoat

In the Northern Hemisphere, mating occurs in the April–July period. In spring, the male's testes are enlarged, a process accompanied by an increase of testosterone concentration in the plasma. Spermatogenesis occurs in December, and the males are fertile from May to August, after which the testes regress. Female stoats are usually only in heat for a brief period, which is triggered by changes in day length. Copulation can last as long as 1 hour. Stoats are not monogamous, with litters often being of mixed paternity. Stoats undergo embryonic diapause, meaning that the embryo does not immediately implant in the uterus after fertilization, but rather lies dormant for a period of nine to ten months. The gestation period is therefore variable but typically around 300 days, and after mating in the summer, the offspring will not be born until the following spring – adult female stoats spend almost all their lives either pregnant or in heat. Females can reabsorb embryos and in the event of a severe winter they may reabsorb their entire litter. Males play no part in rearing the young, which are born blind, deaf, toothless and covered in fine white or pinkish down. The milk teeth erupt after three weeks, and solid food is eaten after four weeks. The eyes open after five to six weeks, with the black tail-tip appearing a week later. Lactation ends after 12 weeks. Prior to the age of five to seven weeks, kits have poor thermoregulation, so they huddle for warmth when the mother is absent. Males become sexually mature at 10–11 months, while females are sexually mature at the age of 2–3 weeks whilst still blind, deaf and hairless, and are usually mated with adult males before being weaned.

=== Territorial and sheltering behaviour ===
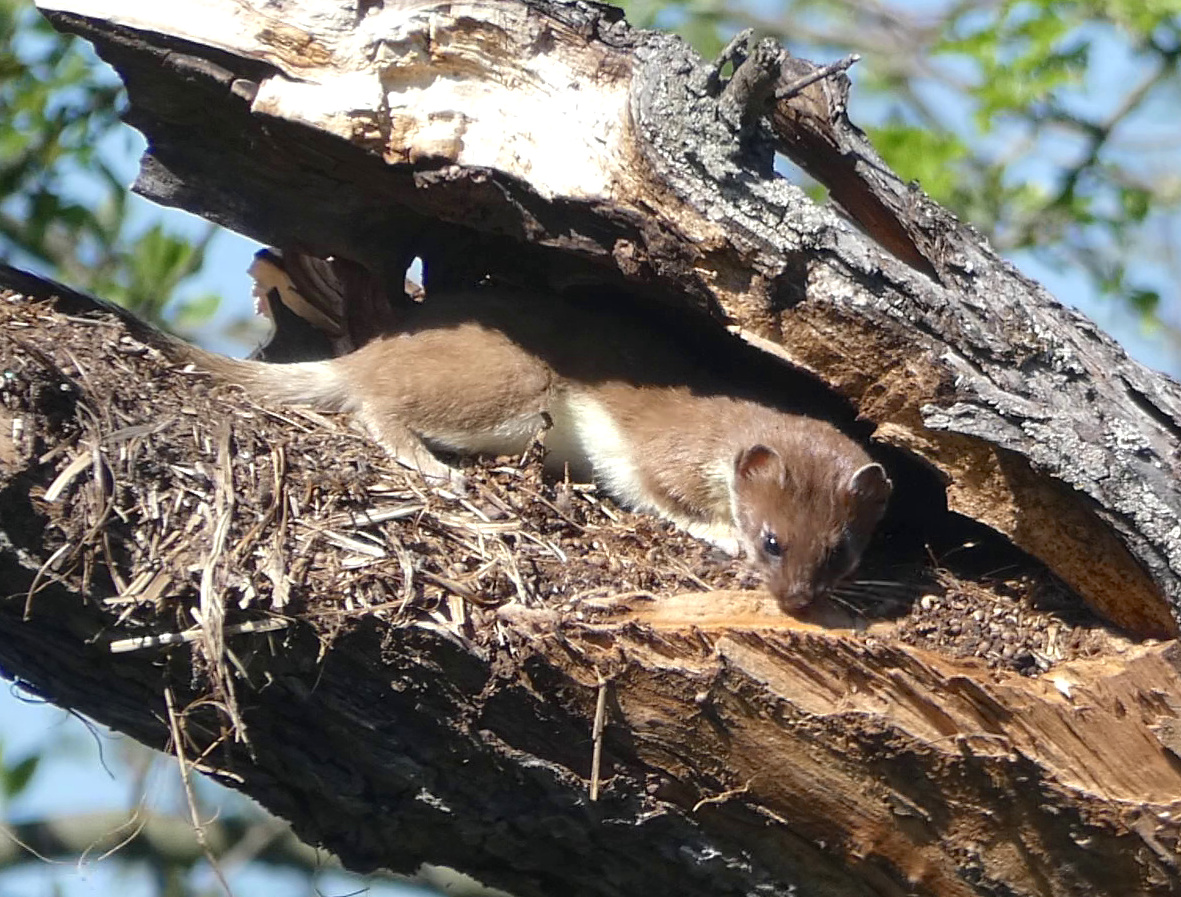
Stoat nesting in a hollow tree

Stoat territoriality has a generally mustelid spacing pattern, with male territories encompassing smaller female territories, which they defend from other males. The size of the territory and the ranging behaviour of its occupants varies seasonally, depending on the abundance of food and mates. During the breeding season, the ranges of females remain unchanged, while males either become roamers, strayers or transients. Dominant older males have territories 50 times larger than those of younger, socially inferior males. Both sexes mark their territories with urine, feces and two types of scent marks; anal drags are meant to convey territorial occupancy, and body rubbing is associated with agonistic encounters.

The stoat does not dig its own burrows, instead using the burrows and nest chambers of the rodents it kills. The skins and underfur of rodent prey are used to line the nest chamber. The nest chamber is sometimes located in seemingly unsuitable places, such as among logs piled against the walls of houses. The stoat also inhabits old and rotting stumps, under tree roots, in heaps of brushwood, haystacks, in bog hummocks, in the cracks of vacant mud buildings, in rock piles, rock clefts, and even in magpie nests. Males and females typically live apart, but close to each other. Each stoat has several dens dispersed within its range. A single den has several galleries, mainly within 30 cm (12 in) of the surface.

=== Diet ===
As with the least weasel, mouse-like rodents predominate in the stoat's diet. It regularly preys on larger rodent and lagomorph species, and takes individuals far larger than itself. In Russia, its prey includes rodents and lagomorphs such as European water voles, common hamsters, pikas and others, which it overpowers in their burrows. Prey species of secondary importance include small birds, fish, and shrews and, more rarely, amphibians, lizards, and insects. It also preys on lemmings. In Great Britain, European rabbits are an important food source, with the frequency in which stoats prey on them having increased between the 1960s and mid 1990s since the end of the myxomatosis epidemic. Typically, male stoats prey on rabbits more frequently than females do, which depend to a greater extent on smaller rodent species. British stoats rarely kill shrews, rats, squirrels and water voles, though rats may be an important food source locally. In Ireland, shrews and rats are frequently eaten. In mainland Europe, water voles make up a large portion of the stoat's diet. Hares are sometimes taken, but are usually young specimens. In New Zealand, the stoat feeds principally on birds, including the rare kiwi, kaka, mohua, yellow-crowned parakeet, and New Zealand dotterel. Cases are known of stoats preying on young muskrats. The stoat typically eats about 50 g (1.8 oz) of food a day, which is equivalent to 25% of the animal's live weight.

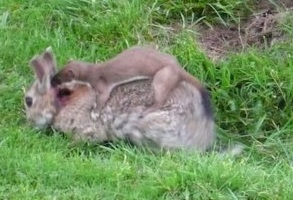
Stoat killing a European rabbit

The stoat is an opportunistic predator that moves rapidly and checks every available burrow or crevice for food. Because of their larger size, male stoats are less successful than females in pursuing rodents far into tunnels. Stoats regularly climb trees to gain access to birds' nests, and are common raiders of nest boxes, particularly those of large species. The stoat reputedly mesmerises prey such as rabbits by a "dance" (sometimes called the weasel war dance), though this behaviour could be linked to Skrjabingylus infections. The stoat seeks to immobilize large prey such as rabbits with a bite to the spine at the back of the neck. The stoat may surplus kill when the opportunity arises; excess prey is usually cached and eaten later. Overweight stoats would be at a disadvantage when pursuing prey into their burrows. Small prey typically die instantly from a bite to the back of the neck, while larger prey, such as rabbits, typically die of shock, as the stoat's canine teeth are too short to reach the spinal column or major arteries.

=== Communication ===
The stoat is a usually silent animal; however, it can produce a range of sounds similar to those of the least weasel. Kits produce a fine chirping noise. Adults trill excitedly before mating, and indicate submission through quiet trilling, whining and squealing. When nervous, the stoat hisses, and will intersperse this with sharp barks or shrieks and prolonged screeching when aggressive.

Aggressive behavior in stoats is categorized in these forms:

- Noncontact approach, which is sometimes accompanied by a threat display and vocalization from the approached animal
- Forward thrust, accompanied by a sharp shriek, which is usually done by stoats defending a nest or retreat site
- Nest occupation, when a stoat appropriates the nesting site of a weaker individual
- Kleptoparasitism, in which a dominant stoat appropriates the kill of a weaker one, usually after a fight.

Submissive stoats express their status by avoiding higher-ranking animals, fleeing from them or making whining or squealing sounds.

=== Predators ===
Larger mammalian predators such as red foxes (Vulpes vulpes) and sables (Martes zibellina) are known to prey on stoats. Additionally, a wide range of birds of prey can take stoats, from small northern hawk-owls (Surnia ulula) and short-eared owls (Asio flammeus) to various buzzards, kites, goshawks, and even Eurasian eagle-owls (Bubo bubo) and golden eagles (Aquila chrysaetos). Although not classified as birds of prey, grey herons (Ardea cinerea) are known to prey on stoats.

=== Diseases and parasites ===
Tuberculosis has been recorded in stoats inhabiting the former Soviet Union and New Zealand. They are largely resistant to tularemia, but are reputed to suffer from canine distemper in captivity. Symptoms of mange have also been recorded.

Stoats are vulnerable to ectoparasites associated with their prey and the nests of other animals on which they do not prey. The louse Trichodectes erminea is recorded in stoats living in Canada, Ireland and New Zealand. In continental Europe, 26 flea species are recorded to infest stoats, including Rhadinospylla pentacantha, Megabothris rectangulatus, Orchopeas howardi, Spilopsyllus ciniculus, Ctenophthalamus nobilis, Dasypsyllus gallinulae, Nosopsyllus fasciatus, Leptospylla segnis, Ceratophyllus gallinae, Parapsyllus n. nestoris, Amphipsylla kuznetzovi and Ctenopsyllus bidentatus. Tick species known to infest stoats are Ixodes canisuga, I. hexagonus, I. ricinus and Haemaphysalis longicornis. Louse species known to infest stoats include Mysidea picae and Polyplax spinulosa. Mite species known to infest stoats include Neotrombicula autumnalis, Demodex erminae, Eulaelaps stabulans, Gymnolaelaps annectans, Hypoaspis nidicorva, and Listrophorus mustelae.

The nematode Skrjabingylus nasicola is particularly threatening to stoats, as it erodes the bones of the nasal sinuses and decreases fertility. Other nematode species known to infect stoats include Capillaria putorii, Molineus patens and Strongyloides martes. Cestode species known to infect stoats include Taenia tenuicollis, Mesocestoides lineatus and rarely Acanthocephala.

== In culture ==
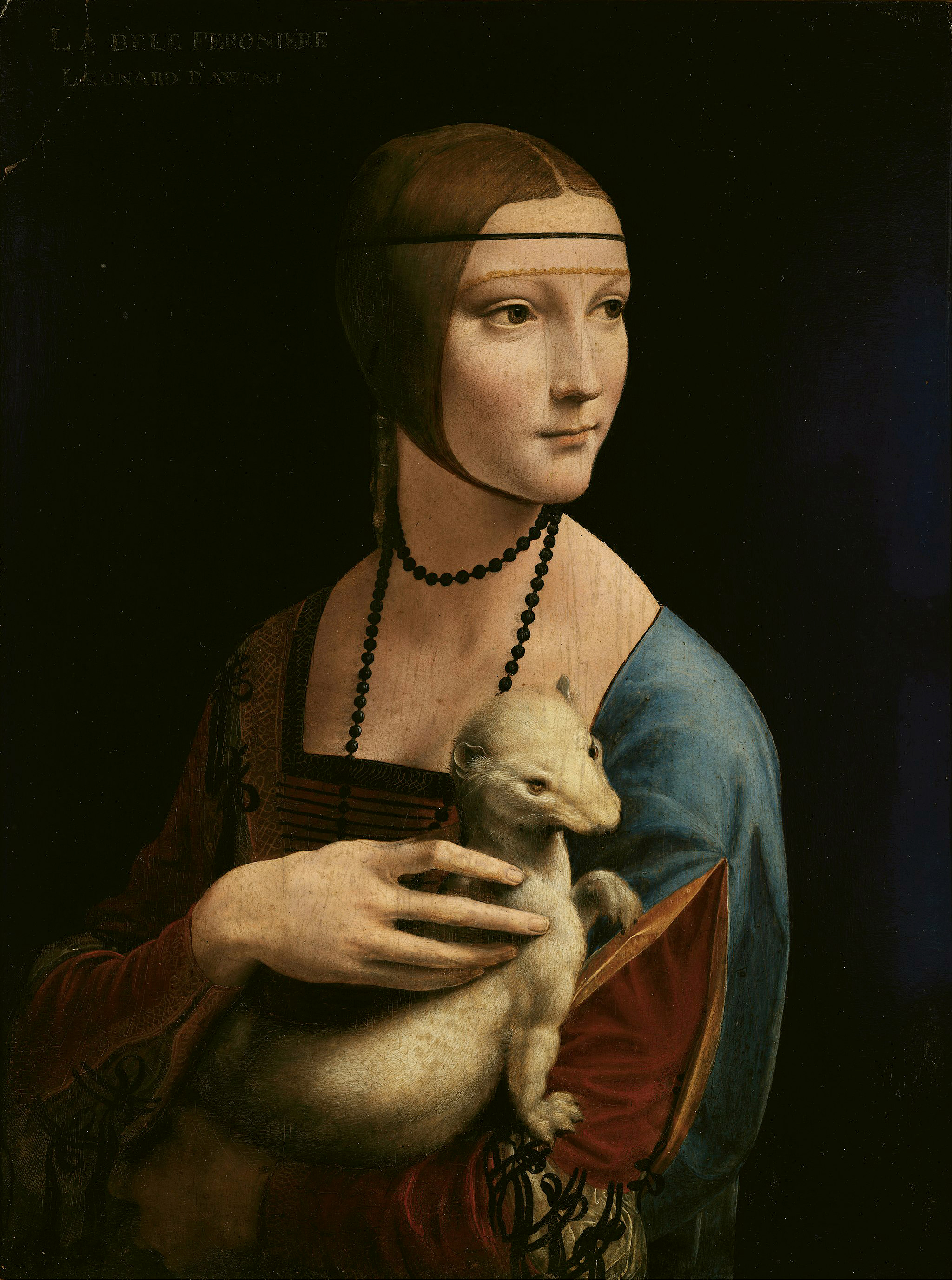
Leonardo da Vinci's Lady with an Ermine (1489–1491), National Museum, Kraków

=== Folklore and mythology ===
In Irish mythology, stoats were viewed anthropomorphically as animals with families, which held rituals for their dead. They were also viewed as noxious animals prone to thieving, and their saliva was said to be able to poison a grown man. To encounter a stoat when setting out for a journey was considered bad luck, but one could avert this by greeting the stoat as a neighbour. Stoats were also supposed to hold the souls of infants who died before baptism.

In the folklore of the Komi people of the Urals, stoats are symbolic of beautiful and coveted young women.

One popular European legend had it that a white stoat would die before allowing its pure white coat to be besmirched. When it was being chased by hunters, it would supposedly turn around and give itself up to the hunters rather than risk soiling itself.

=== Milano Cortina 2026 ===
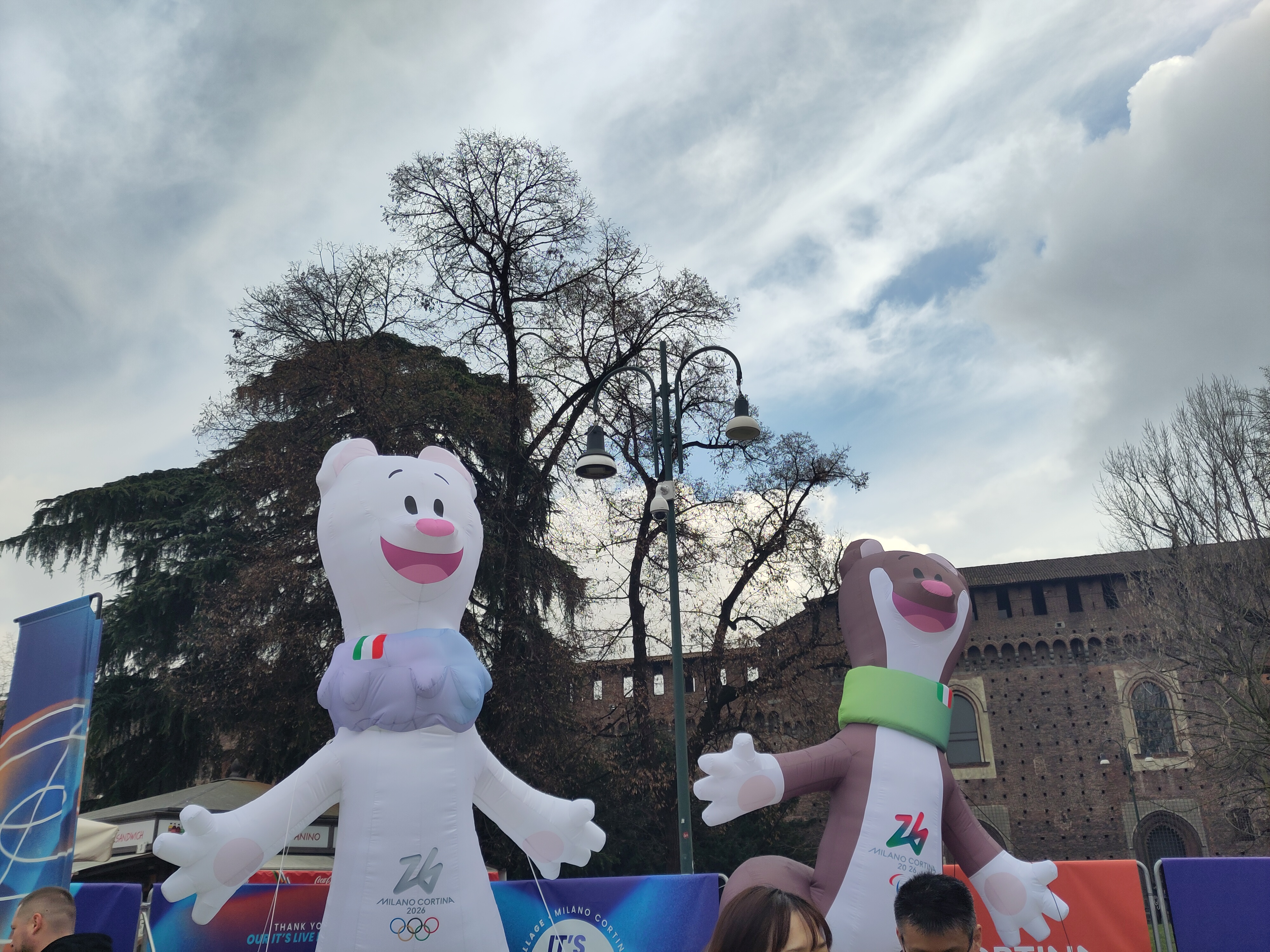
Tina and Milo

The stoat was the inspiration for the mascots "Tina and Milo" at the Milano Cortina Olympic and Paralympic winter games of 2026. Their names are derived from the names of the host cities of the games, Milan and Cortina d'Ampezzo.

They are portrayed as sister and brother.

Milo was the Paralympic mascot and is portrayed as having been born without a leg and learning to use his tail as a leg; it represents ingenuity, willpower and creativity.

Tina was the Olympic mascot that symbolises art, music, and the transformative force of beauty.

=== Fur use ===
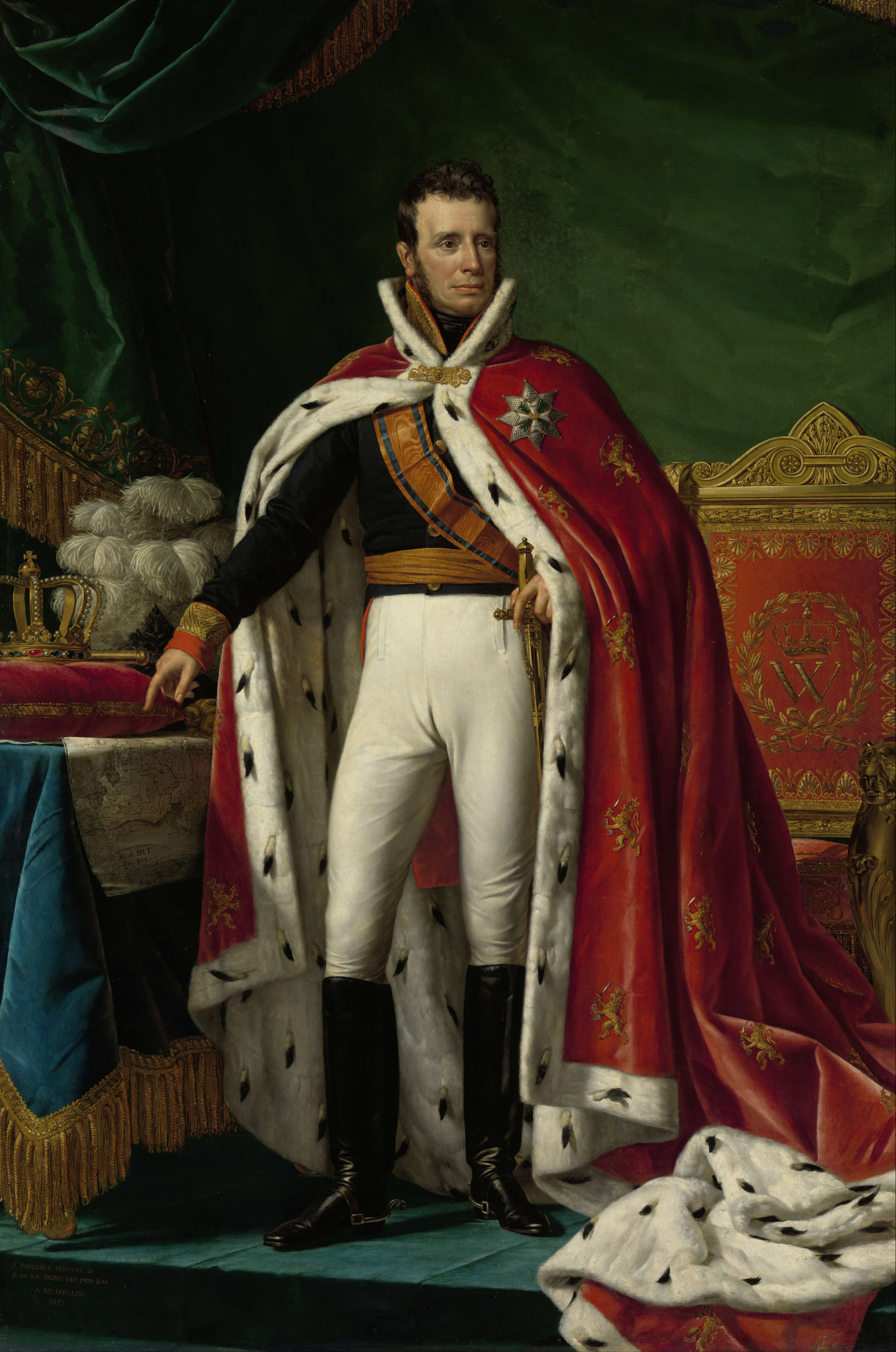
Portrait of William I of the Netherlands wearing an ermine-trimmed cape, 1819

Stoat skins are prized by the fur trade, especially in winter coat, and used to trim coats and stoles. The fur from the winter coat is referred to as ermine and is an ancient symbol of the Duchy of Brittany, forming its earliest flag. There is also a design called ermine inspired by the winter coat of the stoat and painted onto other furs, such as rabbit. In Europe these furs are a symbol of royalty and high status. The ceremonial robes of members of the United Kingdom peerage and the academic hoods of the universities of Oxford and Cambridge are traditionally trimmed with ermine. In practice, rabbit or fake fur is now often used due to expense or animal rights concerns. Prelates of the Catholic Church still wear ecclesiastical garments featuring ermine (a sign of their status equal to that of the nobility). Cecilia Gallerani is depicted holding an ermine in her portrait, Lady with an Ermine, by Leonardo da Vinci. Henry Peacham's Emblem 75, which depicts an ermine being pursued by a hunter and two hounds, is entitled Cui candor morte redemptus ("Purity Bought with His Own Death"); Peacham goes on to preach that men and women should follow the example of the ermine and keep their minds and consciences as pure as the legendary ermine keeps its fur.

Ermine in heraldry is a fur, a type of tincture, consisting of a white background with a pattern of black shapes representing the winter coat of the stoat. The linings of medieval coronation cloaks and some other garments, usually reserved for use by high-ranking peers and royalty, were made by sewing many ermine furs together to produce a luxurious white fur with patterns of hanging black-tipped tails. Due largely to the association of the ermine fur with the linings of coronation cloaks, crowns and peerage caps, the heraldic tincture of ermine was usually reserved to similar applications in heraldry (i.e., the linings of crowns and chapeaux and of the royal canopy). Ermine, both M. erminea and M. richardsonii were also valued by the Tlingit and other indigenous peoples of the Pacific Northwest Coast. They could be attached to traditional regalia and cedar bark hats as status symbols, or they were also made into shirts.

The stoat was a fundamental item in the fur trade of Russia until the 20th century. At times, no less than half the global catch came from within the borders of the former Soviet Union, containing the highest grades of stoat pelts. Stoat harvesting never became a specialty in any part of Russia, with most stoats being captured either in box-traps or jaw-traps, or with dogs. Dogs have typically been used to capture stoats incidentally near villages in Russia, and less often as part of pre-planned hunts. Guns were rarely used, as they could damage the pelt.
