= Mustela aistoodonnivalis =

Missing-toothed pygmy weasel

Conservation status
- Data Deficient (IUCN 3.1)

Scientific classification
- Kingdom: Animalia
- Phylum: Chordata
- Class: Mammalia
- Order: Carnivora
- Family: Mustelidae
- Genus: Mustela
- Species: M. aistoodonnivalis

Binomial name
- Mustela aistoodonnivalis Wu & Kao, 1991

Synonyms
- Mustela nivalis ssp. russelliana Thomas, 1911; Mustela russelliana Thomas 1911

Species of carnivore

Mustela aistoodonnivalis, the missing-toothed pygmy weasel or Sichuan weasel, is a species of weasel that inhabits mountains in the Shaanxi and Sichuan provinces of China.

== Description ==
The external features of the missing toothed weasel are very similar to least weasels, but the tail is very long, exceeding one third of the length of body and head. The summer fur of the back, tail and head is dark brown, and there are no dark markings on face or head. Under the lip, chin and throat, the fur is white but the chest and belly are a pale yellow with some irregular and rusty-red spots. The backs of the front legs are brown, and the hind limbs are similarly brown but the inner lateral parts are white hairs with brown spots. The palms and soles have shorter hair. The second lower molar (M2) is absent unlike least weasels.

The species is named for the second lower molar (M2) being absent unlike in the least weasel.

Body length is 13.1–16.0 centimetres (5.2–6.3 in). The tail of 5.0–6.2 centimetres (2.0–2.4 in) is about 40% as long as the body.

== Taxonomy ==
Given that it closely resembles the least weasel, after its initial description some taxonomists synonymized these two species, believing the missing-toothed pygmy weasel to be a subspecies of least weasels with a longer tail and a missing tooth. However with a more thorough morphological examination of the skins and skulls, Colin Groves concluded it was a separate species. A recent genetic and morphometric study has since proved that the missing-toothed pygmy weasel is indeed a separate species, more closely related to stoats than it is to least weasel.

== Distribution and habitat ==
Very few samples have ever been obtained of this species, all from the mountains of the Shaanxi and Sichuan provinces of China.

== Ecology ==
The ecology of the missing-toothed pygmy weasel remains unstudied. The few individuals recorded have been found from 1,950 to 4,480 metres (6,400 to 14,700 ft) above sea level.
