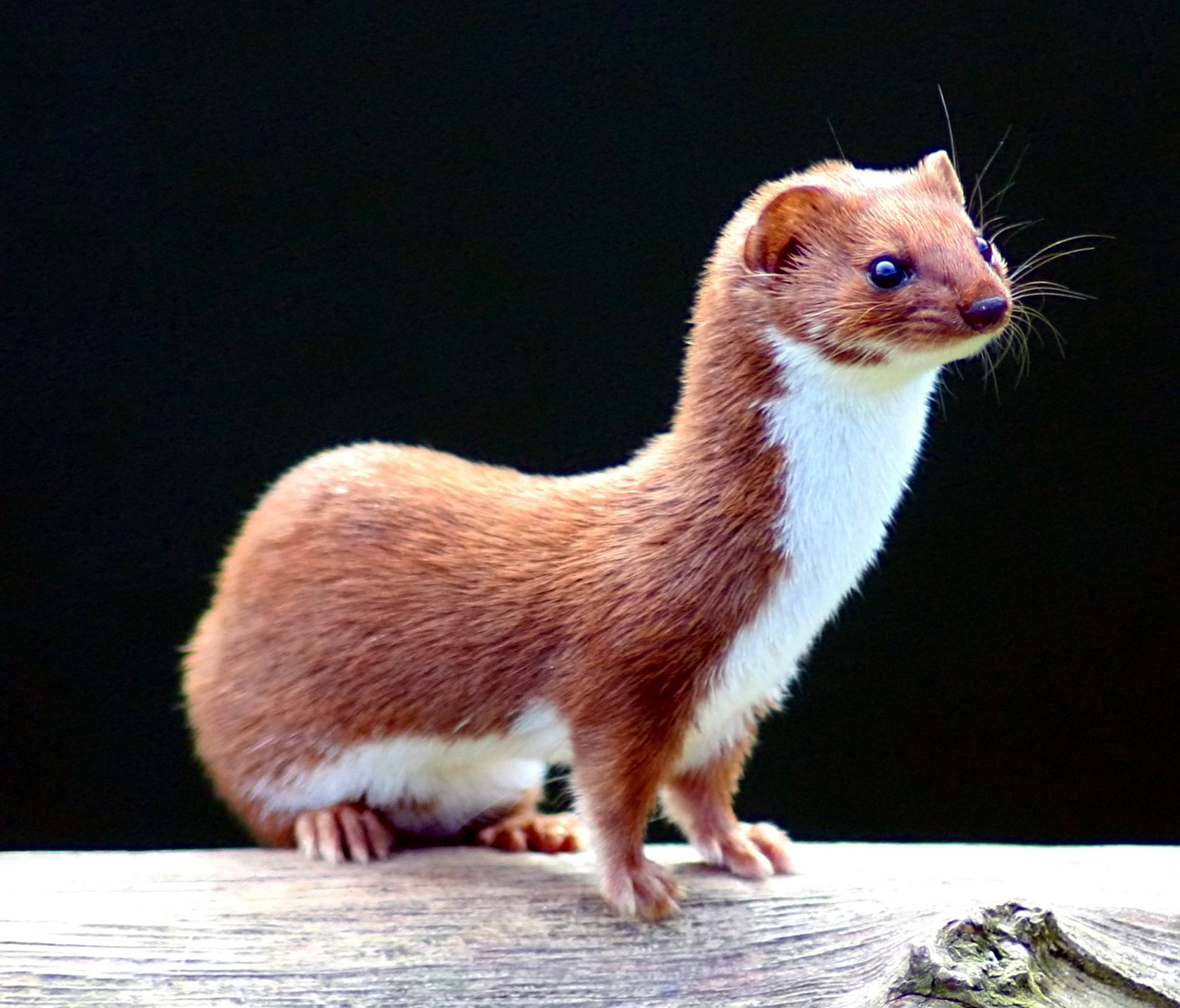
- Least weasel in England

Scientific classification
- Kingdom: Animalia
- Phylum: Chordata
- Class: Mammalia
- Order: Carnivora
- Family: Mustelidae
- Subfamily: Mustelinae
- Genus: Mustela; Linnaeus, 1758

Type species
- Mustela erminea Linnaeus, 1758

Species
- Mustela aistoodonnivalis; Mustela altaica; Mustela erminea; Mustela eversmannii; Mustela furo; Mustela haidarum; Mustela itatsi; †Mustela jacksoni; Mustela kathiah; Mustela lutreola; Mustela lutreolina; †Mustela meltoni; Mustela mopbie; Mustela nigripes; Mustela nivalis; Mustela nudipes; †Mustela ogygia; †Mustela pachygnatha; †Mustela palaeattica; †Mustela palermina; †Mustela plioerminea; †Mustela praenivalis; Mustela putorius; †Mustela rexroadensis; Mustela richardsonii; Mustela sibirica; †Mustela spelaea; Mustela strigidorsa; Mustela tonkinensis
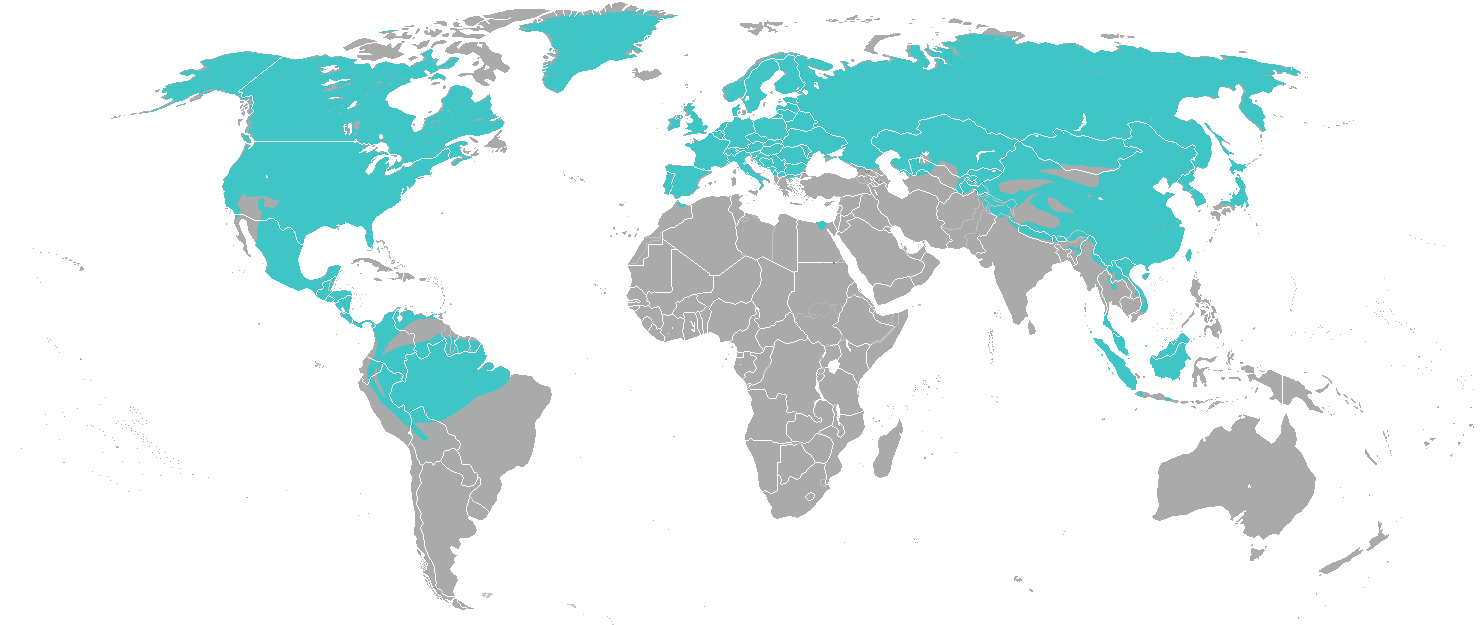
- Combined Mustela and Neogale ranges

= Weasel =

Mammal of the mustelid family

Weasels /ˈwiːzəlz/ are mammals of the genus Mustela of the family Mustelidae. The genus Mustela includes the least weasels, polecats, stoats, ferrets, and European mink. Members of this genus are small, active predators, with long and slender bodies and short legs. The family Mustelidae, or mustelids (which also includes badgers, otters, and wolverines), is often referred to as the "weasel family". In Great Britain, the term "weasel" usually refers to the smallest species, the least weasel (M. nivalis), the smallest carnivoran species.

Least weasels vary in length from 173 to 217 mm (6 3/4 to 8 1/2 in), females being smaller than the males, and usually have red or brown upper coats and white bellies; some populations of some species moult to a wholly white coat in winter. They have long, slender bodies, which enable them to follow their prey into burrows. Their tails may be from 34 to 52 mm (1 1/4 to 2 in) long.

Weasels feed on small mammals and have from time to time been considered vermin because some species took poultry from farms or rabbits from commercial warrens. They do, on the other hand, eat large numbers of rodents. Their range spans Europe, North America, much of Asia, and small areas in North Africa.

== Terminology ==
The English word "weasel" was originally applied to one species of the genus, the European form of the least weasel (Mustela nivalis). This usage is retained in British English, where the name is also extended to cover several other small species of the genus. However, in technical discourse and in American usage, the term "weasel" can refer to any member of the genus, the genus as a whole, and even to members of the related genus Neogale. Of the 16 extant species currently classified in the genus Mustela, 10 have "weasel" in their common names. Among those that do not are the three species of ermine, (Note: These three species are Mustela erminea, (the Eurasian ermine or stoat); M. haidarum, (the Haida ermine); and M. richardsonii, (the American ermine).) the polecats, the ferret, and the European mink.

The American mink and the extinct sea mink were commonly included in this genus as Mustela vison and Mustela macrodon, respectively, but in 1999 they were moved to the genus Neovison. In 2021, both Neovison species, along with the long-tailed weasel (Mustela frenata), Amazon weasel (Mustela africana) and Colombian weasel (Mustela felipei) were moved to the genus Neogale, as the clade containing these five species was found to be fully distinct from Mustela.

=== Taxonomy ===
The genus name Mustela comes from the Latin word for weasel combining the words mus meaning "mouse" and telum meaning "javelin" for its long body.

== Species ==
The following information is according to the Integrated Taxonomic Information System and MammalDiversity.

Subgenus	Image	Scientific name	Common name	Distribution
Mustela		Mustela altaica Pallas, 1811	Mountain weasel	Northern and Southern Asia
Mustela		Mustela aistoodonnivalis Wu & Kao, 1991	Missing-toothed pygmy weasel	Shaanxi and Sichuan, China
Mustela		Mustela erminea Linnaeus, 1758	Stoat, Beringian ermine, Eurasian ermine, or short-tailed weasel	Europe and Northern Asia; Arctic Canada and Alaska (United States); Southern Asia (non-native); New Zealand (non-native)
Mustela		Mustela haidarum Preble, 1898	Haida ermine	Haida Gwaii (British Columbia, Canada) and Alexander Archipelago (Alaska, United States)
Mustela		Mustela kathiah Hodgson, 1835	Yellow-bellied weasel	Southern Asia
Mustela		Mustela nivalis Linnaeus, 1766	Least weasel	Europe, North Africa and Northern Asia; North America; Southern Asia (non-native); New Zealand (non-native)
Mustela		Mustela richardsonii Bonaparte, 1838	American ermine	Most of North America south of Alaska and the Arctic Circle; eastern Nunavut and Baffin Island
Lutreola		Mustela itatsi Temminck, 1844	Japanese weasel	Japan and formerly Sakhalin Island, Russia
Lutreola		Mustela lutreola (Linnaeus, 1761)	European mink	Europe
Lutreola		Mustela lutreolina Robinson and Thomas, 1917	Indonesian mountain weasel	Southeastern Asia
Lutreola		Mustela nudipes Desmarest, 1822	Malayan weasel	Southeastern Asia
Lutreola		Mustela sibirica Pallas, 1773	Siberian weasel	Europe and Northern Asia; Southern Asia
Lutreola		Mustela strigidorsa Gray, 1855	Back-striped weasel	Southern Asia
Putorius		Mustela eversmanii (Lesson, 1827)	Steppe polecat	Southeast Europe and Northern Asia; Southern Asia
Putorius		Mustela furo Linnaeus, 1758	Domestic ferret	Domestic Worldwide (domesticated); New Zealand (non-native)
Putorius		Mustela putorius Linnaeus, 1758	European polecat	Europe, North Africa and Northern Asia
Putorius		Mustela nigripes (Audubon and Bachman, 1851)	Black-footed ferret	North America

^{1} Europe and Northern Asia division excludes China.

== Cultural meanings ==
Weasels have been assigned a variety of cultural meanings.

In Greek culture, a weasel near one's house is a sign of bad luck, even evil, "especially if there is in the household a girl about to be married", since the animal (based on its Greek etymology) was thought to be an unhappy bride who was transformed into a weasel and consequently delights in destroying wedding dresses. In Macedonia, however, weasels are generally seen as an omen of good fortune.

In early-modern Mecklenburg, Germany, amulets from weasels were deemed to have strong magic; the period between 15 August and 8 September was specifically designated for the killing of weasels.

In Montagne Noire (France), Ruthenia, and the early medieval culture of the Wends, weasels were not meant to be killed.

According to Daniel Defoe also, meeting a weasel is a bad omen. In English-speaking areas, weasel can be an insult, noun or verb, for someone regarded as sneaky, conniving or untrustworthy. Similarly, "weasel words" is a critical term for words or phrasing that are vague, misleading or equivocal.

=== Japanese superstitions ===
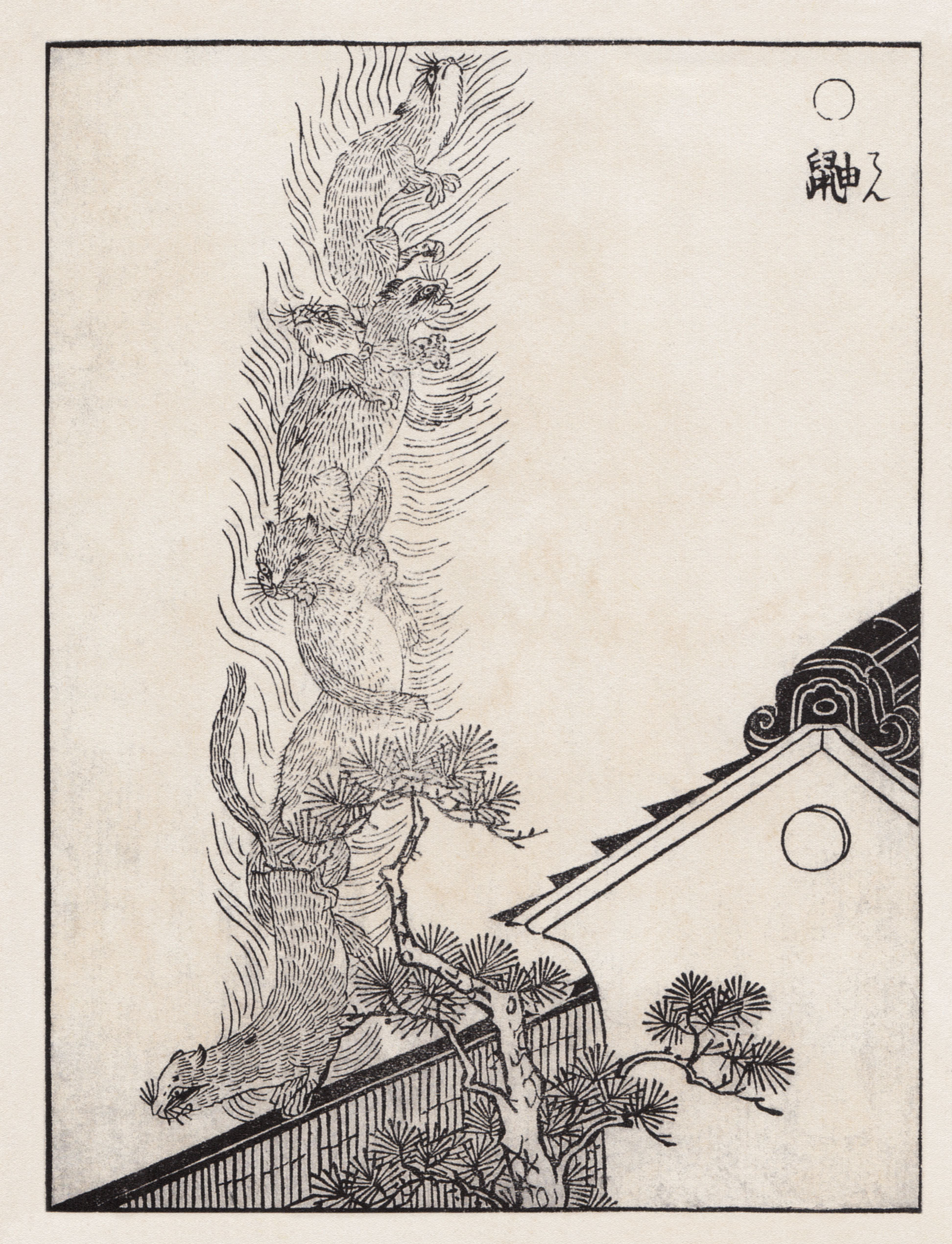
"Ten" from the Gazu Hyakki Yagyō by Sekien Toriyama

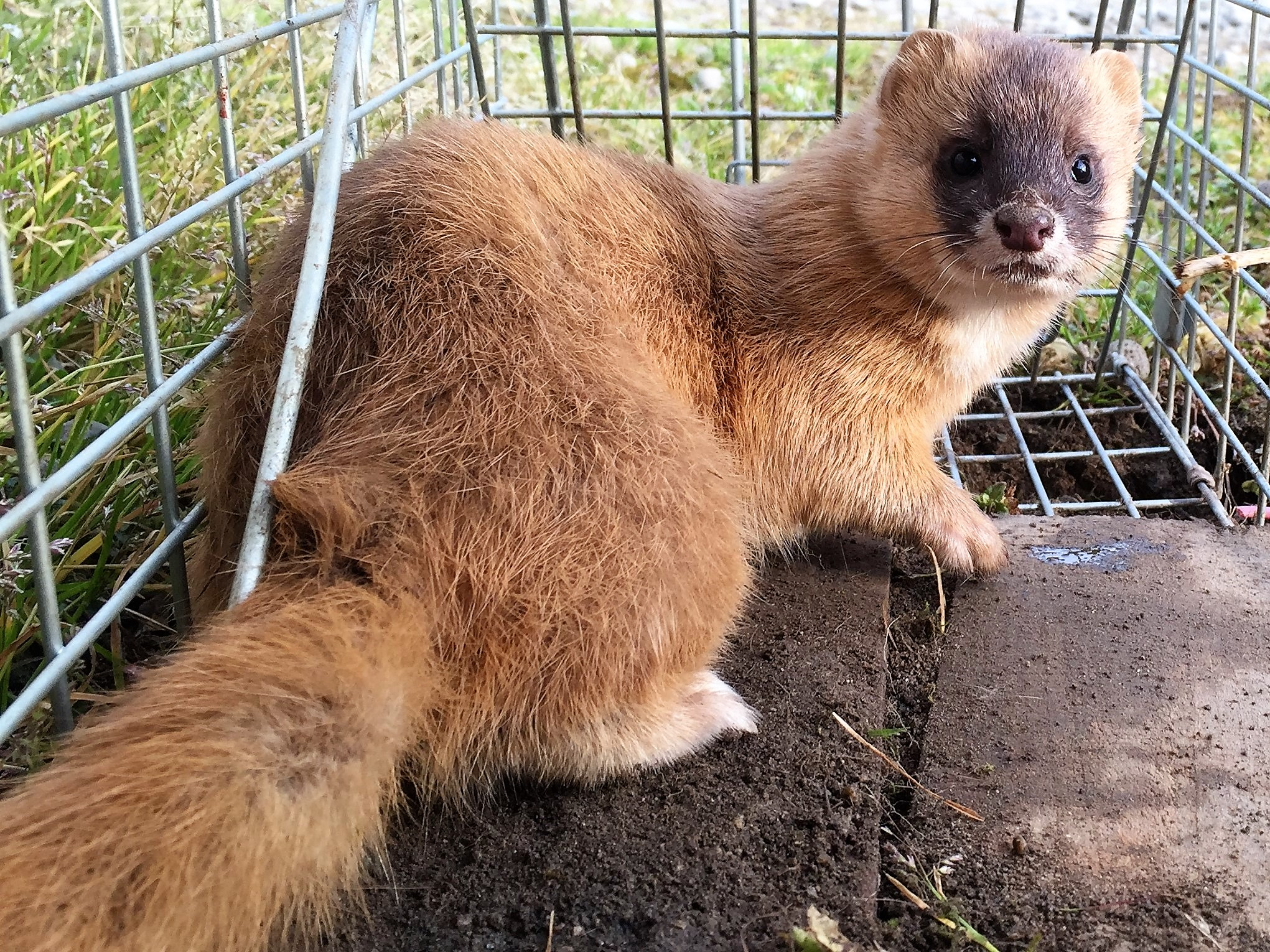
Japanese weasel

In Japan, weasels (鼬、鼬鼠, itachi) were seen as yōkai (causing strange occurrences). According to the encyclopedia Wakan Sansai Zue from the Edo period, a pack of weasels would cause conflagrations, and the cry of a weasel was considered a harbinger of misfortune. In the Niigata Prefecture, the sound of a pack of weasels making a rustle resembled six people hulling rice, so was called the "weasel's six-person mortar", and it was an omen for one's home to decline or flourish. It is said that when people chase after this sound, the sound stops.

They are also said to shapeshift like the fox (kitsune) or tanuki, and the nyūdō-bōzu told about in legends in the Tōhoku region and the Chūbu region are considered weasels in disguise, and they are also said to shapeshift into ōnyūdō and little monks.

In the collection of depictions Gazu Hyakki Yagyō by Sekien Toriyama, they were depicted under the title 鼬, but they were read not as "itachi", but rather as "ten", and "ten" were considered to be weasels that have reached one hundred years of age and became yōkai that possessed supernatural powers. Another theory is that when weasels reach several hundred years of age, they become mujina (Japanese badgers).

In Japanese, weasels are called iizuna or izuna (飯綱) and in the Tōhoku Region and Shinshu, it was believed that there were families that were able to use a certain practice to freely use kudagitsune as iizuna-tsukai or kitsune-mochi. It is said that Mount Iizuna, from the Nagano Prefecture, got its name due to how the gods gave people mastery of this technique from there.

According to the folklorist Mutō Tetsujō, "They are called izuna in the Senboku District, (Note: However, in the Senboku District, especially in Obonai village (生保内村), they are called okojo.) Akita Prefecture, and there are also the ichiko (itako) that use them." Also, in the Kitaakita District, they are called mōsuke (猛助), and they are feared as yōkai even more than foxes (kitsune).

In the Ainu language, ermines are called upas-čironnup or sáčiri, but since least weasels are also called sáčiri, Mashio Chiri surmised that the honorary title poy-sáčiri-kamuy (where poy means "small") refers to least weasels.

==== Kamaitachi ====
Kamaitachi is a phenomenon wherein one who is idle is suddenly injured as if his or her skin were cut by a scythe. In the past, this was thought to be "the deed of an invisible yōkai weasel". An alternate theory, asserts that kamaitachi is derived from kamae Tachi (構え太刀; "stance sword"), so were not originally related to weasels at all.
