= Indonesian mountain weasel =

Conservation status
- Least Concern (IUCN 3.1)

Scientific classification
- Kingdom: Animalia
- Phylum: Chordata
- Class: Mammalia
- Order: Carnivora
- Family: Mustelidae
- Genus: Mustela
- Species: M. lutreolina

Binomial name
- Mustela lutreolina Robinson & Thomas, 1917
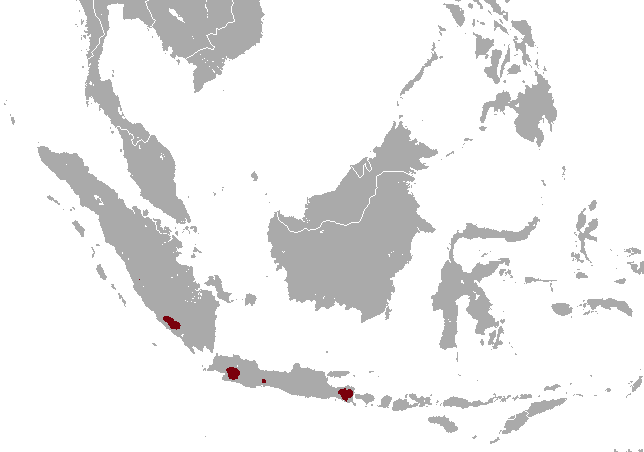
- Indonesian mountain weasel range

Species of carnivore

The Indonesian mountain weasel (Mustela lutreolina) is a species of carnivorous mammal belonging to the family Mustelidae, which includes the weasels, martens, badgers and related taxa. This species is endemic to Indonesia where it occurs on the islands of Java and Sumatra.

== Taxonomy ==
The Indonesian mountain weasel was first formally described in 1917 by the Britsih zoologists Herbert C. Robinson amd Oldfield Thomas with its type locality given as West Java. This species is classified in the genus Mustela, in the subfamily Mustelinae, the "typical weasels", minks and ferrets, in the family Mustelidae, which alos includes otters, bagders, martens and related taxa.

== Etymology ==
The Indonesia mountian weasel is in the genus Mustela, the latin word for a weasel, its specific name, lutreolina is derived from Lutreola, a mink, Robinson and Thomas refereed to its resemblance to a mink in the title of their description.

== Description ==
The Indonesian mountain weasel measures 45 cm (18 in) in length and the colour of its fur is variable from dark brown to grey.

== Distribution and habitat ==
The Indonesian Mountain Weasel is endemic to Indonesia where it is known only from the highlands of Sumatra and Java. On Java it is found in the west and as far east as the Ijang plateau. On Sumatra, it has been recorded from Bengkulu province in the south, north through Gunung Dempo and Gunung Kerinci in Kerinci Seblat National Park, as far as Gunung Leuser National Park in the far north of the island. Most records of this little known carnivore come from forests at altitudes greater than 1,400 m (4,600 ft) above sea level.

== Food habits ==
Indonesian mountain weasels are carnivorous, and are especially adapted to eating rodents. They are able to kill prey much larger than themselves due to their speed and agility.
