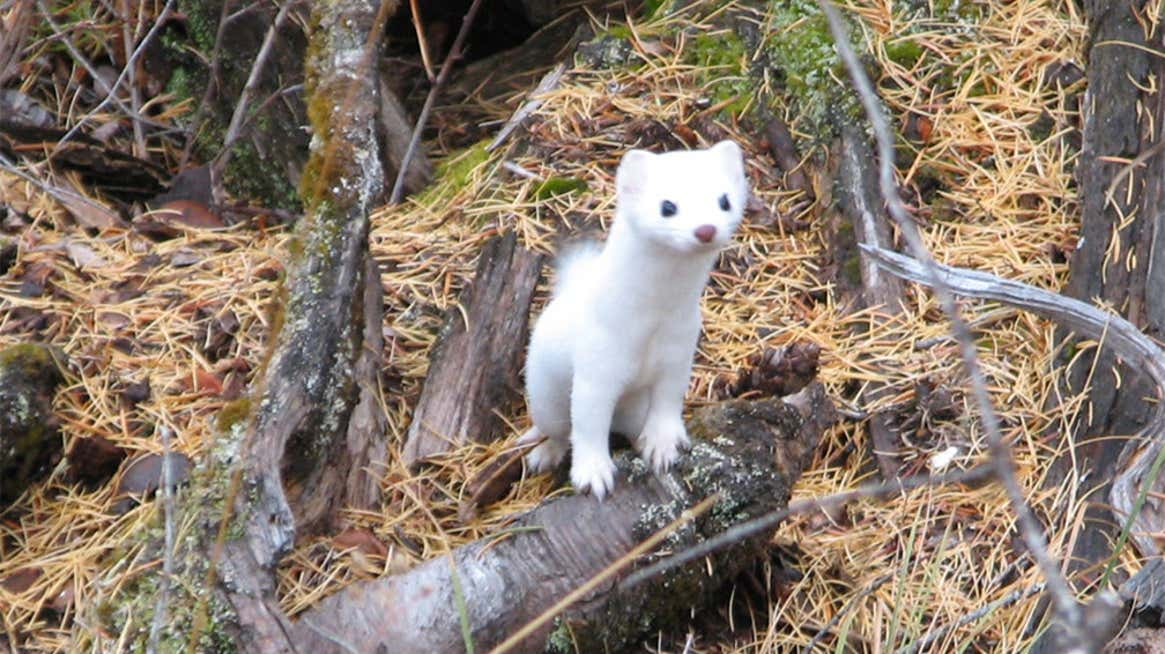
- In winter coat

Conservation status
- Threatened (COSEWIC) (listed as Mustela erminea haidarum)

- Vulnerable (NatureServe) (for both celenda and seclusa subspecies; species as whole unranked)

Scientific classification
- Kingdom: Animalia
- Phylum: Chordata
- Class: Mammalia
- Infraclass: Placentalia
- Order: Carnivora
- Family: Mustelidae
- Genus: Mustela
- Species: M. haidarum

Binomial name
- Mustela haidarum Preble, 1898

Subspecies
- M. h. haidarum Preble, 1898; M. h. celenda Hall, 1944; M. h. seclusa Hall, 1944

Synonyms
- Mustela erminea haidarum; Mustela erminea celenda; Mustela erminea seclusa; Neogale haidarum

= Haida ermine =

Species of carnivore

The Haida ermine (Mustela haidarum) is a mustelid species endemic to a few islands off the Pacific Northwest of North America, namely Haida Gwaii in Canada and the southern Alexander Archipelago in the U.S. state of Alaska.

== Indigenous names ==
In the Haida language, this species is known as daayáats’ in its brown summer coat and tlag in its winter coat.

== Taxonomy ==
The three subspecies of the Haida ermine were originally considered subspecies of the common stoat (M. erminea). However, in 2013, they were recognized as distinct from any other ermine, and a 2021 study further found them to comprise a distinct species. M. haidarum is thought have originated about 375,000 years ago (during the Pleistocene), and is thought to be the result of ancient hybrid speciation between the Beringian ermine (M. erminea) and American ermine (M. richardsonii). The islands are thought to have been glacial refugia during the Last Glacial Maximum, with both species of ermine being isolated on the islands and hybridizing with one another, while the ice sheets separated them from the rest of the world—thus leading to the formation of a new species. It is recognized as a distinct species by the American Society of Mammalogists.

== Distribution ==
The species is found on a few islands off the coast of British Columbia and southeast Alaska. In Canada, it is found on the Haida Gwaii archipelago in Graham and Moresby islands, while in Alaska it is found on Prince of Wales Island and possibly Suemez Island. It is found in a temperate rainforest habitat.

== Description ==
Aside from genetic differences, M. haidarum can be distinguished from M. erminea and M. richardsonii by its elongated skull.

== Subspecies ==
Three subspecies are thought to exist.

Subspecies	Trinomial authority	Description	Range	Synonyms
Haida ermine (previously the Queen Charlotte Islands stoat or Haida stoat) M. h. haidarum	Preble, 1898	Smallest size of 20 ermine subspecies in North America. The colour of its summer coat is mostly chocolate brown. During the winter, the Ermine is all white with a black tipped tail, despite lesser snow coverage throughout lower elevations on Haida Gwaii.	Haida Gwaii	Mustela erminea haidarum
Prince of Wales Island ermine M. h. celenda	Hall, 1944		Prince of Wales Island	Mustela erminea celenda
Suemez Island ermine M. h. seclusa	Hall, 1944		Suemez Island	Mustela erminea seculsa

== Conservation ==
The habitat for the Haida ermine has been intensively reduced over the past few centuries due to old-growth timber harvest in the Tongass National Forest, an important protected area for the species, as well as industrial-scale mining on the islands, which disproportionately affects insular endemics such as M. haidarum. Expanding human populations and increasing tourism may increase the risk of pathogen spillover to M. haidarum, including pathogens common to pets such as canine distemper and parvoviruses, which have negatively impacted other wild mustelids. Due to the rudimentary understanding of the true level of endemism in these northern archipelagos, these threats must be better quantified to protect species from them. The Pacific martens (M. caurina) inhabiting Haida Gwaii also represent a distinct lineage from other populations, indicating that the habitat of the islands may have allowed other distinct species or subspecies to evolve.

== Behavior ==
The Haida ermine traverse their environment with quick momentum from their small legs. They root around in search of holes and crevices often scouting their surroundings on their hind legs. They hunt in short periods often in ten to fourteen minute increments up to four hours, interchanging between break periods every three to five hours of the day. They typically hunt prey that are several times their own weight by precise lunges at the neck. Except for rabbits which have too much fur around their neck for the bite to penetrate but instead are gripped at the nape and scratched with their hind legs. Haida ermine are known to lick the blood created by them off their prey first. They kill when given the chance and store what isn't required at the time in their nests.
