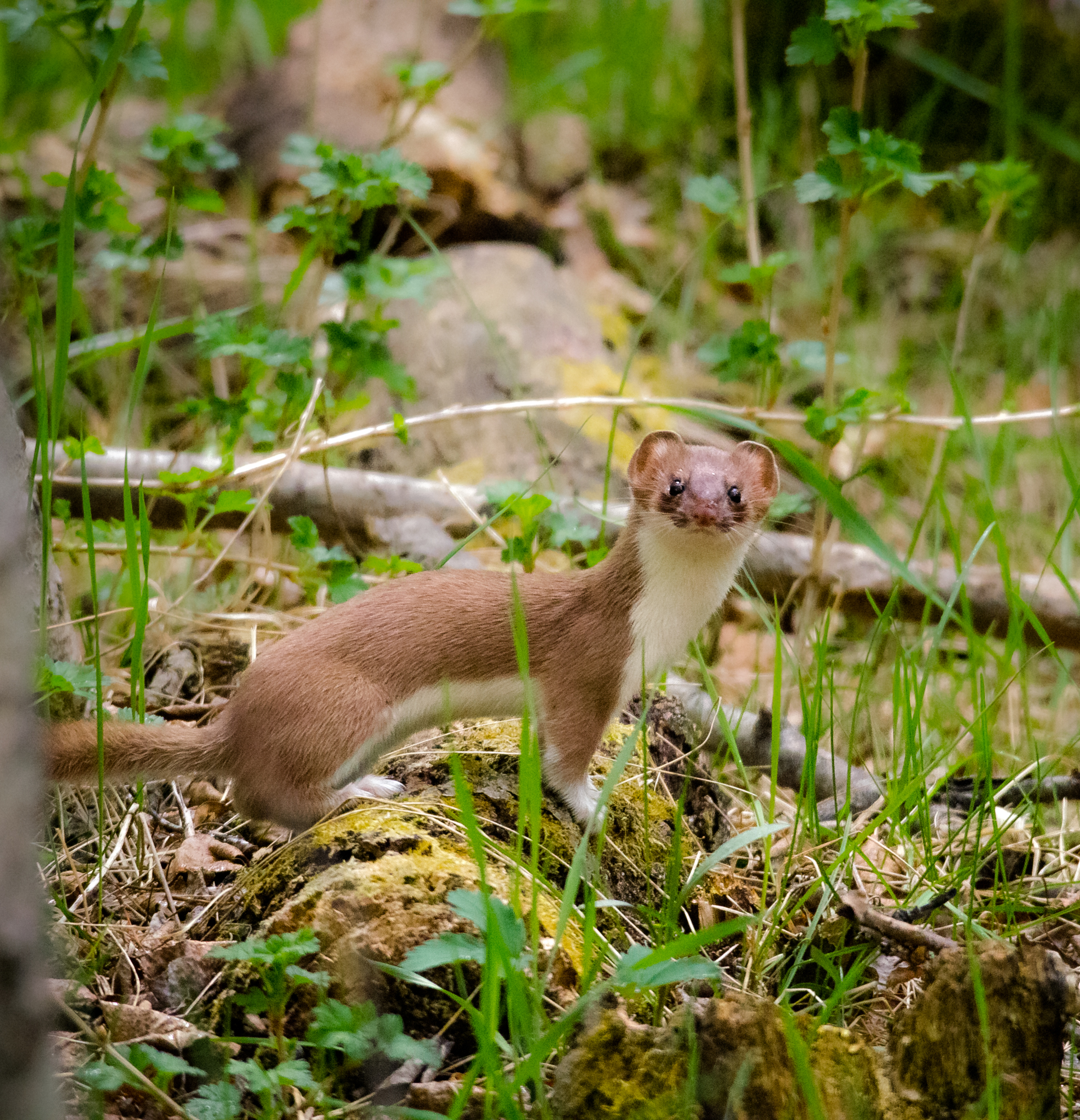
- Near Beaverhill Lake, Alberta

Conservation status
- Secure (NatureServe)

Scientific classification
- Kingdom: Animalia
- Phylum: Chordata
- Class: Mammalia
- Order: Carnivora
- Family: Mustelidae
- Genus: Mustela
- Species: M. richardsonii

Binomial name
- Mustela richardsonii Bonaparte, 1838

Subspecies
- See text

Synonyms
- Mustela erminea richardsonii; Neogale richardsonii

= American ermine =

Species of mammal (mustelid)

The American ermine or American stoat (Mustela richardsonii) is a member of the family Mustelidae and of the genus mustelid. Previously thought of as conspecific with the stoat (M. erminea), they have a body plan typical of weasels and are native to most of North America. There are currently 13 recognized subspecies. American ermines are small carnivorous mammals that live in a variety of terrestrial habitats, such as forests and wetlands.

== Description ==
The American ermine has a body plan typical of weasels. It has short legs, a long body and neck, and a small triangular head with short round ears. It has a brown dorsum with a white venter (except during winter when the coat is fully white) and a short, black-tipped tail. The black coloring of the tail may serve to distract predators and divert attacks away from the body, which blends in more with its surroundings. American ermines are sexually dimorphic and males are 30% larger than females.

== Taxonomy ==
The specific epithet, richardsonii, refers to Arctic explorer and naturalist Sir John Richardson. The American ermine was long considered conspecific with the stoat (M. erminea), but a 2021 study found it to be a distinct species, forming distinct genetic clades from erminea. The finding has been accepted by the American Society of Mammalogists. The Haida ermine (M. haidarum) is thought to be a hybrid species originating from ancient hybridization between M. erminea and M. richardsonii.

== Distribution ==
The species is found throughout most of North America aside from most of Alaska (although it is found on some islands in southeastern Alaska), eastern Yukon, most of Arctic Canada, and Greenland, where it is replaced by M. erminea. It reaches the northern extent of its range in Ellesmere Island and a portion of eastern mainland Nunavut and ranges from here to cover almost all of western North America south to northern New Mexico, and eastern North America south to northern Virginia. It is absent from most of the Southeastern United States and the Great Plains.

== Diet ==
Ermines are primarily nocturnal hunters, although they can also be seen frequently during the day. In North America, where the ecological niche for rat- and rabbit-sized prey is taken by the larger long-tailed weasel (Neogale frenata), the carnivorous American ermine preys mainly on mice and voles. Shrews, young cottontails, chipmunks, deer mice, jumping mice, and house mice are also preyed on. Occasionally, small birds, frogs, small fish, and earthworms are eaten. Usually the ermine kills by biting at base of skull.

== Habitat and Breeding ==
Ermines are terrestrial and non-migratory, with an average home range of 12-16 hectares. They are found in a variety of habitats, including wetlands, woodlands, forests, and alpine terrain. However, they prefer environments with thick understories near water. Ermines live in hollow spaces in logs, under rocks or stumps, or in burrows and man-made structures. Sometimes, they will take over the nest of their prey and use their prey's fur as lining. In the winter, ermines usually stay beneath the surface of the snow.

Ermines breed in dense parts of the forest. Males mature in a year, while females take only three to four months to mature. The breeding season is from July to August. The females carry a litter of four to nine babies, with an average of six to seven, for 255 days, then give birth in mid-April to early May.

== Predators ==
Some of the larger wild predators of ermines are minks, martens, fishers, bobcats, coyotes, and large owls and hawks. Occasionally a domesticated cat or dog may kill an ermine. Their small agile bodies help them evade these predators, while also allowing them to compete with their predators for food in more barren months.

== Subspecies ==
About 13 subspecies are known:

Subspecies	Trinomial authority	Description	Range	Synonyms
Junean stoat M. r. alascensis.	Merriam, 1896	Similar to M. r. richardsonii, but with a broader skull and more extensive white tips on the limbs	Juneau, Alaska	
Vancouver Island stoat M. r. anguinae	Hall, 1932		Vancouver Island	
Western Great Lakes stoat M. r. bangsi	Hall, 1945		The region west of the Great Lakes	cicognani (Mearns, 1891) pusillus (Aughey, 1880)
Bonaparte's stoat M. r. cigognanii	Bonaparte, 1838	A small subspecies with a dark brown summer coat; its skull is more lightly built than that of richardsonii.	The region north and east of the Great Lakes	pusilla (DeKay, 1842) vulgaris (Griffith, 1827)
M. r. fallenda	Hall, 1945		BC, Canada	
M. r. gulosa	Hall, 1945		Washington, USA	
M. r. initis	Hall, 1945		Baranof Island, AK, USA	
M. r. invicta	Hall, 1945		Idaho, USA	
Southwestern stoat or New Mexico ermine M. r. muricus	Bangs, 1899	The smallest subspecies of richardsonii.	The southwestern extremity of the species' American range (Nevada, Utah, Colorado and other states)	leptus (Merriam, 1903)
Olympic stoat M. r. olympica	Hall, 1945		The Olympic Peninsula, Washington	
Richardson's stoat M. r. richardsonii	Bonaparte, 1838	Similar to M. r. cigognanii, but larger, with a dull chocolate brown summer coat	Newfoundland, Labrador and nearly all of Canada (save for the ranges of other American stoat subspecies)	imperii (Barrett-Hamilton, 1904) microtis (J. A. Allen, 1903) mortigena (Bangs, 1913)
Baffin Island stoat M. r. semplei Baffin Island Stoat	Sutton and Hamilton, 1932		Baffin Island and the adjacent parts of the mainland	labiata (Degerbøl, 1935)
M. r. stratori	Merriam, 1896	Similar to M. r. cigognanii, but smaller and dark chocolate brown with color encroaching on the belly.	The West Coast of the USA	

== Gallery ==
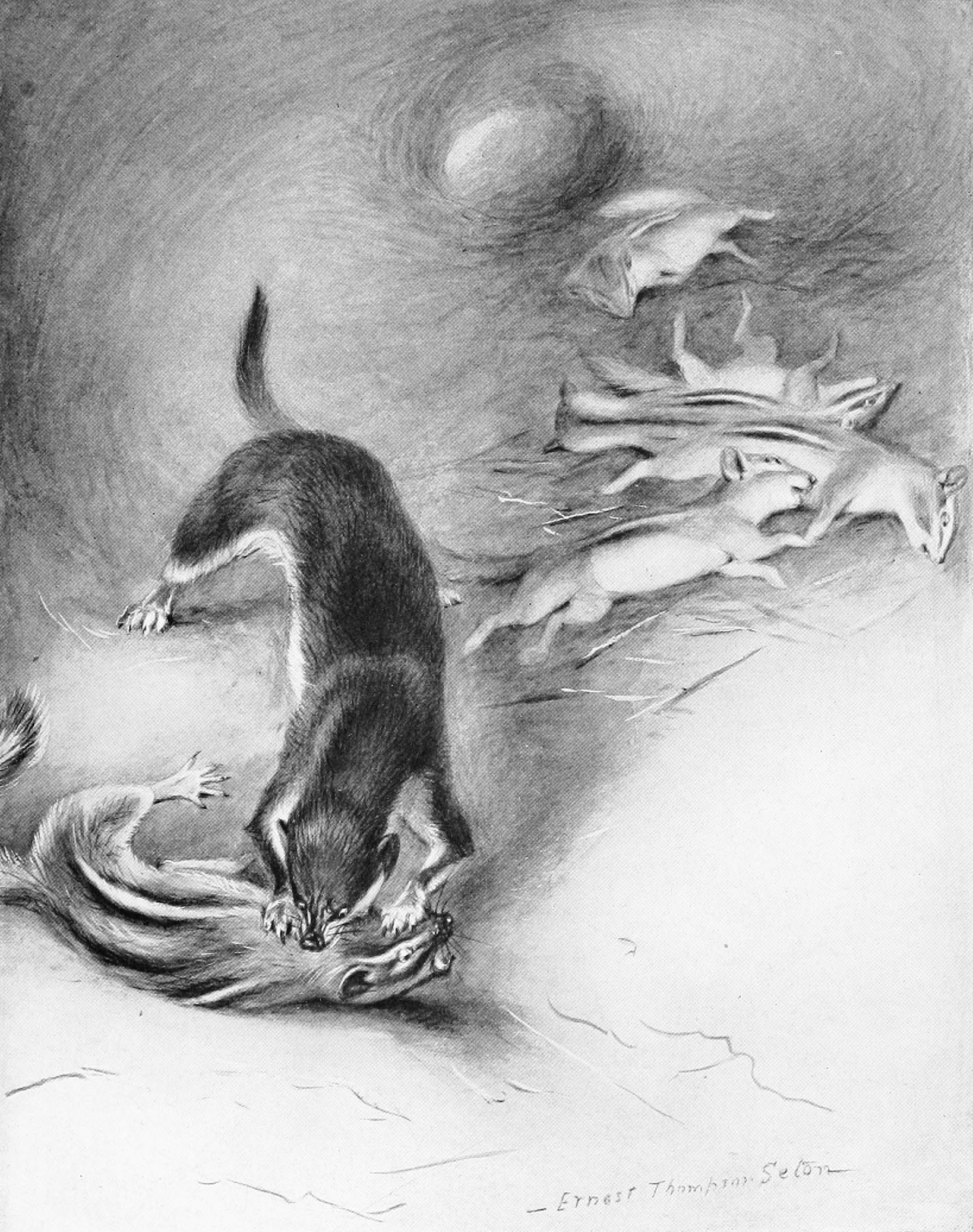
American ermine surplus killing a family of chipmunks, as illustrated by Ernest Thompson Seton

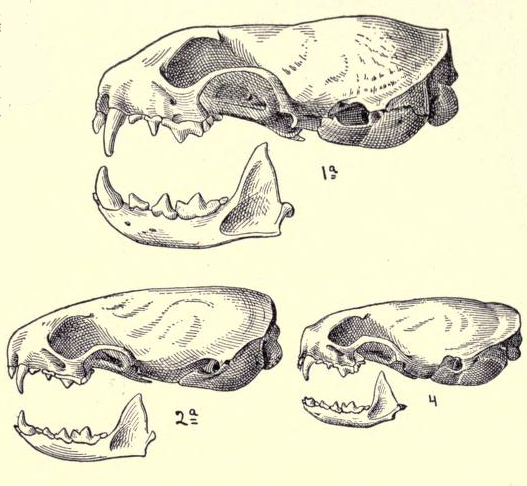
Skulls of a long-tailed weasel (top), an American ermine (bottom left), and least weasel (bottom right), as illustrated in Merriam's Synopsis of the Weasels of North America

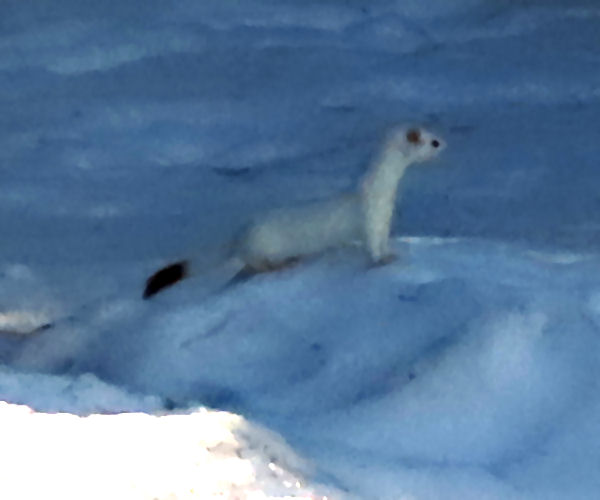
Winter coat

== Bibliography ==
- Merriam, Clinton Hart (1896). Synopsis of the weasels of North America. Washington, D.C.: Govt. Print. Off.
- Verts, B. J.; Carraway, Leslie N. (1998). Land Mammals of Oregon. University of California Press. ISBN 0-520-21199-5.
