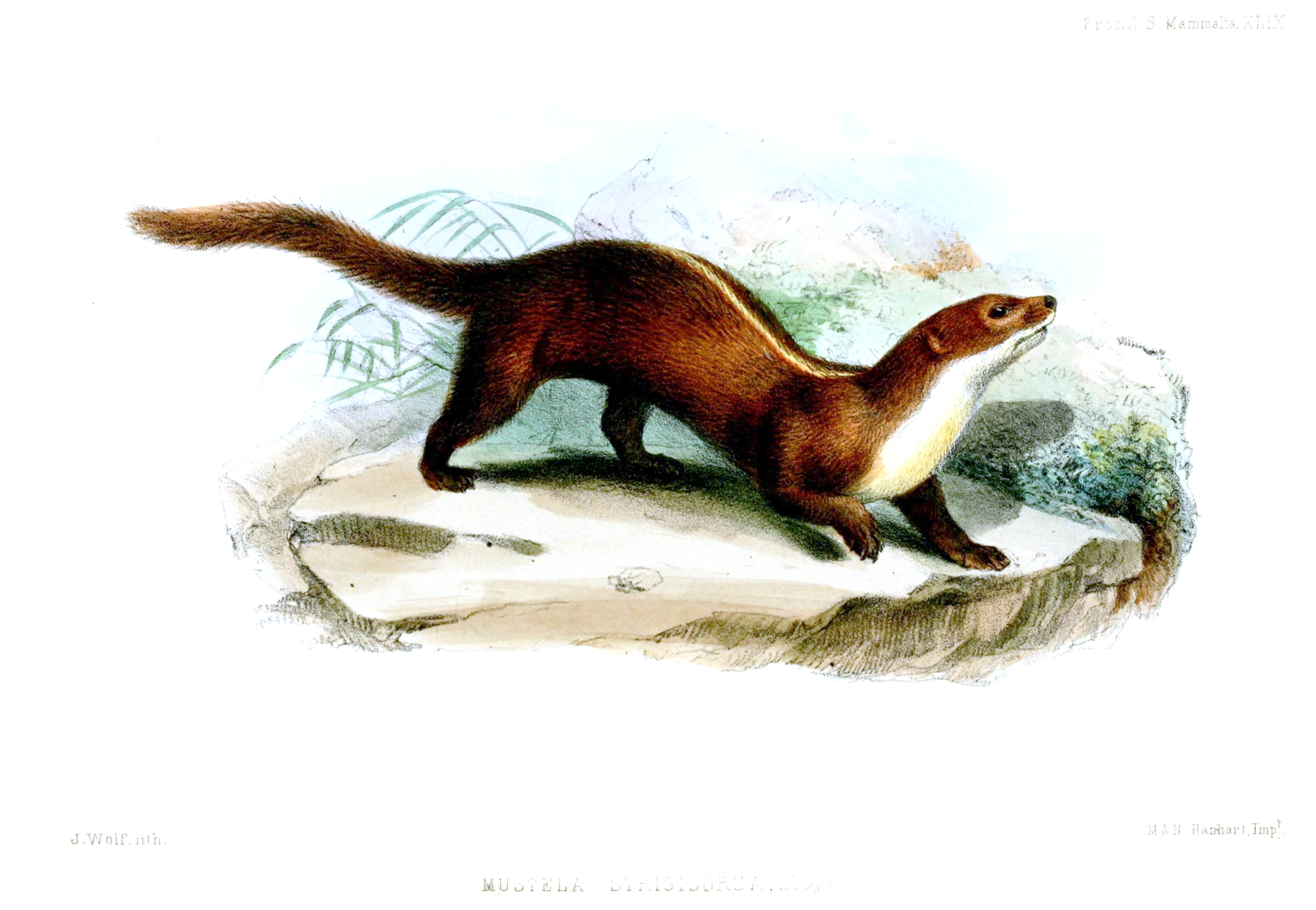
- A 19th century illustration of a back-striped weasel

Conservation status
- Least Concern (IUCN 3.1)

Scientific classification
- Kingdom: Animalia
- Phylum: Chordata
- Class: Mammalia
- Order: Carnivora
- Family: Mustelidae
- Genus: Mustela
- Species: M. strigidorsa

Binomial name
- Mustela strigidorsa Gray, 1853
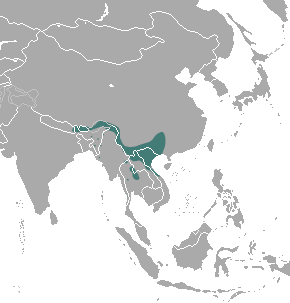
- Back-striped weasel range

= Back-striped weasel =

Species of carnivore

The back-striped weasel (Mustela strigidorsa), also called the stripe-backed weasel, is a weasel widely distributed in Southeastern Asia. It is listed as Least Concern on the IUCN Red List in view of its presumed large population, occurrence in many protected areas, apparent tolerance to some degree of habitat modification and hunting pressure.

== Characteristics ==
The back-striped weasel is distinguished from all other Mustela species by the presence of a narrow, silvery dorsal streak extending from the occiput almost to the root of the tail, with a corresponding yellowish ventral streak from the chest along the abdomen. The general colour of the dorsal surface varies from deep to paler chocolate brown, sometimes a little paler on the head and usually slightly darkened along the side of the dorsal streak. The tail and limbs are of the same hue as the back. The upper lip from the rhinarium, the chin and the throat up to the level of the ears are pale varying from whitish to ochreous. On the hind throat and fore chest, the pale hue gradually narrows in extent, and is quite narrow between the forelegs, where it passes into the ventral streak, which expands on the inguinal region between thighs. The pads of the feet are well developed, the plantar ads being four-lobed, with the area around them entirely naked.

The bushy tail is rather long, being more than half the length of the head and body. The length of head and body of males is 30–36 cm (12–14 in), while the tail length is 18–20 cm (7.1–7.9 in). A live-captured juvenile male was estimated to weigh only 700 g (1.5 lb).

== Distribution and habitat ==
The occurrence of the stripe-backed weasel has been confirmed from scattered localities in and around northeastern India, northern and central Myanmar, southern China, northern Thailand, northern and central Laos and Vietnam at an elevation range from sea level to 2,500 m (8,200 ft). It inhabits a wide variety of habitats, and it is not yet possible to define its habitat needs. Specimens collected came from dense hill jungle, hill evergreen forest, disturbed evergreen forest, lower montane evergreen forest and lowland evergreen forest. Most field sightings were in daylight.

In India, it was recorded in Dampa Tiger Reserve in 1994, and in Namdapha National Park. In Laos, two individuals were sighted in 2008, both near streams in evergreen forest in Nakai–Nam Theun National Biodiversity Conservation Area.

== Ecology and behavior ==
In the Naga Hills, one was seen fighting with a large bandicoot rat.

== Threats ==
The back-striped weasel is potentially threatened by snares placed in its habitat, which target small edible wildlife.

== Conservation ==
The back-striped weasel is protected in Thailand and nationally listed as Endangered in China.
