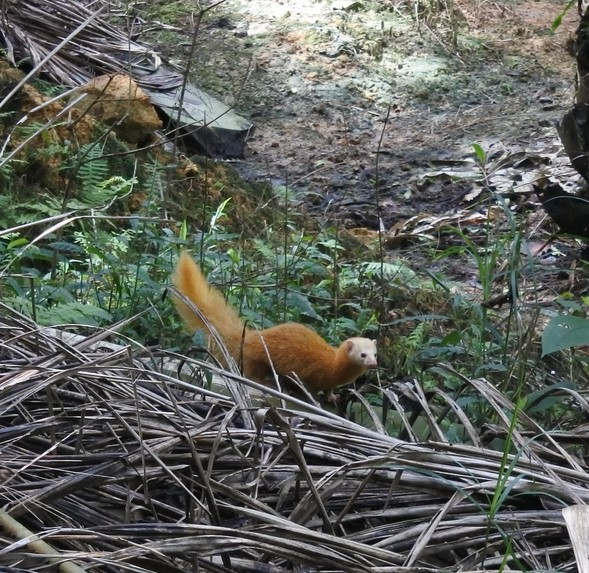

Conservation status
- Least Concern (IUCN 3.1)

Scientific classification
- Kingdom: Animalia
- Phylum: Chordata
- Class: Mammalia
- Order: Carnivora
- Family: Mustelidae
- Genus: Mustela
- Species: M. nudipes

Binomial name
- Mustela nudipes Desmarest, 1822
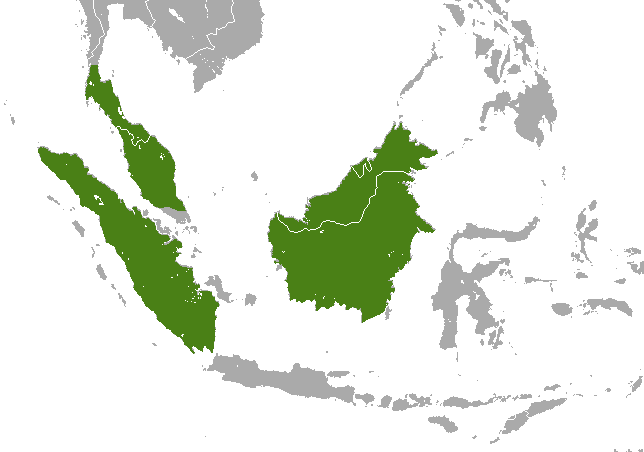
- Distribution of the Malayan weasel

= Malayan weasel =

Species of weasel from Malay Peninsula

The Malayan weasel (Mustela nudipes) or Malay weasel is a weasel species native to the Malay Peninsula and the islands of Sumatra and Borneo. It is listed as Least Concern on the IUCN Red List.

== Description ==
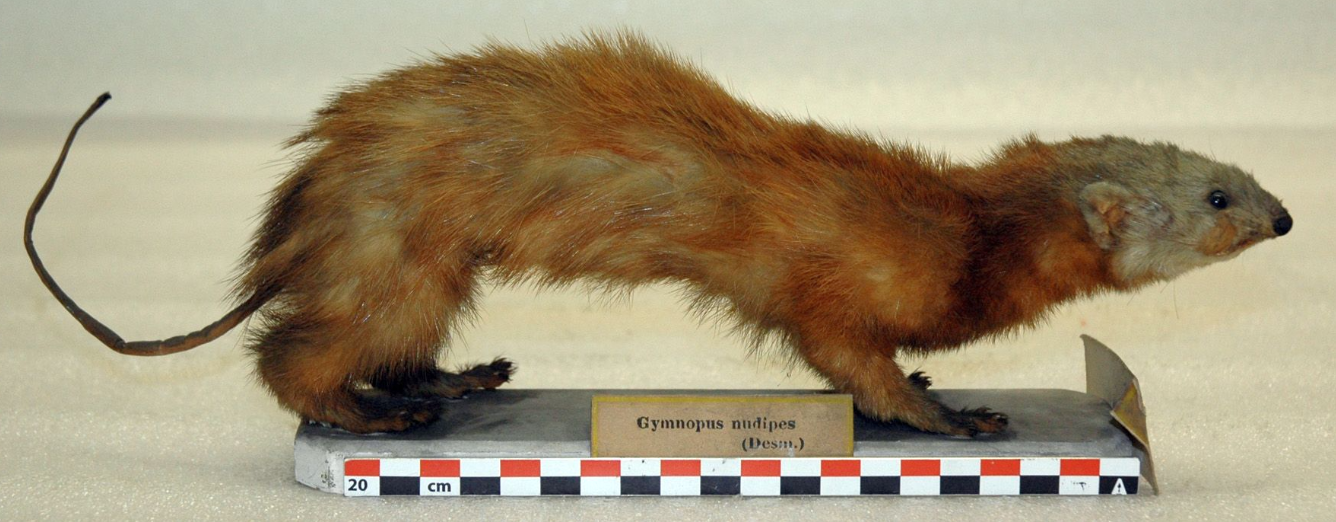
Taxidermied specimen in a museum

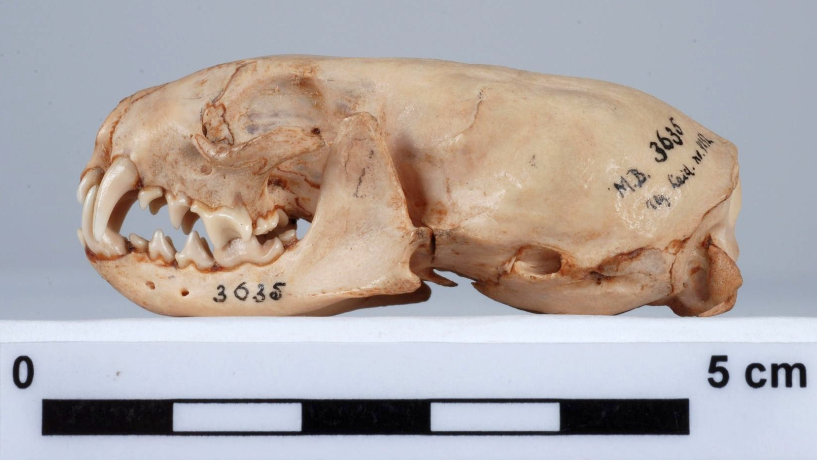
Skull

The Malayan weasel is reddish-brown to grayish-white. Its head is lighter in colour than the rest of the body. The distal half of the tail is pale orange to white. The soles of the feet are naked. It has a body length of 30–36 cm (12–14 in) with a 24–26 cm (9.4–10.2 in) long tail.

== Distribution and habitat ==
The Malayan weasel is native to the Malay Peninsula from southern Thailand to peninsula Malaysia, and Sumatra and Borneo. It is generally associated with tropical lowland forest, but has been recorded in habitats ranging from swamp and montane forests to plantations and high elevation montane scrub up to 1,700 m (5,600 ft). A better understanding of habitat preferences would require surveys specifically aimed at the Malayan weasel because it is rarely detected by general camera trap, road mortality, and visual surveys.

In Borneo, it was photographed in primary dipterocarp and logged forest at elevations of 177–1,032 m (581–3,386 ft).

== Ecology and behavior ==
The Malayan weasel is very poorly known, but assumed to occur at low densities and behave elusively based on low detection rates. It is a ground-living species and its morphology not suited to climbing. Their diet is unknown but assumed to be similar to other small weasels: mostly carnivorous, including small rodents, birds, eggs, and small reptiles. Most records of the species occurred during the day, but more research is needed to determine whether Malayan weasels are also active nocturnally. The majority of sightings have been of single animals, suggesting a solitary nature as seen in most weasel species of genus Mustela. Not much is known about its breeding habits, but a litter of four has been recorded.

== Taxonomy ==
There are two subspecies of the Malayan weasel:

- Mustela nudipes nudipes
- Mustela nudipes leucocephalus

== Relationship with humans ==
Records of Malayan weasels in highly degraded forests, plantations, and even suburban areas suggest that the species is tolerant of humans. Malayan weasels are sometimes killed by villagers for medicinal use, food, trophy, fur, for killing chickens, and incidental by-catch in snares. Regardless, in some areas they are seen positively and allowed in villages as a predator of crop-raiding rats. The wide range of the species across various habitats and tolerance of humans suggests resilience to local habitat conversion. Though overall numbers are stable, Malayan weasels are protected in peninsular Malaysia and Thailand due to local declines.
