= Mountain weasel =

Mountain Weasel
- In Hemis National Park, India

Conservation status
- Near Threatened (IUCN 3.1)
- CITES Appendix III

Scientific classification
- Kingdom: Animalia
- Phylum: Chordata
- Class: Mammalia
- Order: Carnivora
- Family: Mustelidae
- Genus: Mustela
- Species: M. altaica

Binomial name
- Mustela altaica Pallas, 1811
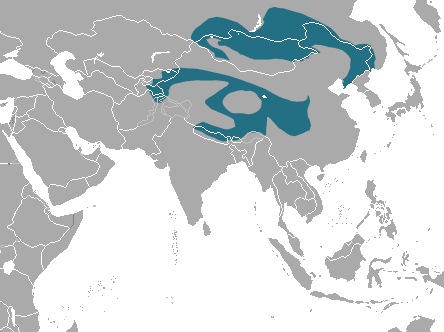
- Mountain weasel range

Species of mammal

The mountain weasel (Mustela altaica), also known as the pale weasel, Altai weasel or solongoi, primarily lives in high-altitude environments, as well as rocky tundra and grassy woodlands. This weasel rests in rock crevices, tree trunks, and abandoned burrows of other animals or the animals it previously hunted. The home range size of this animal is currently unknown. Geographical distribution for this species lies in parts of Asia from Kazakhstan, Tibet, and the Himalayas to Mongolia, northeastern China, and southern Siberia. The most common area for this species, however, is Ladakh, India. The conservation status, according to the IUCN, is near threatened because it is considered to be in significant decline and requires monitoring mainly because of habitat and resource loss.

== Description ==
Sexual dimorphism is slight in the Altai weasel. The male body length from head to base of the tail is about 8.5–11 in (220–280 mm), with the tail adding about 4–6 in (100–150 mm). Males can weigh 8–12 oz (230–340 g). Females are slightly smaller, with their head and body lengths measuring around 8.5–10 in (220–250 mm), with their tails adding 3.5–5 in (89–127 mm), and they weigh about 4–8 oz (110–230 g). This species undergoes seasonal molts during the spring and autumn. The summer coat consists of gray to gray-brown fur with some light yellow, while the winter fur is more of a dark yellow with some brown. In both coats, the underbelly is pale yellow to creamy white. The upper head between the muzzle and ears is usually darker gray-brown. The tail may be more rufous than the back. The summer fur is gray to gray-brown with some light yellow. The lips are white and the chin has grayish-brown vibrissae.

== Fossil record ==
The mountain weasel is known from Denisova Cave, where the first remains of Denisovans were also discovered.

== Reproduction ==
Overall, these animals are thought to be solitary animals except when mating. The mating system for these animals is unknown, but other species in the same genus are polygynous. Polygynous groups usually consist of one male and multiple females. The mountain weasel breeds once a year. Males fight vigorously for access to females. Mating usually occurs in February or March, and the young are usually born in May. The gestation period is 30–49 days, but these periods of gestation and birth can be altered because the animal is capable of delayed implantation; the female can breed and the egg is fertilized, but the egg does not attach to the endometrium in the uterus to continue pregnancy until resources are available to maintain the pregnancy and feed the young. The litter size is one to eight young. The offspring are born altricial, require nourishment and depend on the mother, their eyes are closed, and their fur is not well developed. Lactation lasts about two months, and after weaning, the young become independent but remain with their littermates until fall. Young can breed in the following season when they are just under a year of age.

== Behavior ==
The mountain weasel is capable of climbing, running, and swimming. Their long bodies and short legs allow them to be very agile. Altai weasels are generally nocturnal, but may hunt during daylight. Although solitary, they communicate with each other visually and vocally. This animal has extremely good vision. They also communicate by sound to warn of possible predators, to protect their territories, and when mating. When threatened, they emit a loud chirring sound and excrete a foul, pungent odor from their anal glands.

== Food habits ==
The mountain weasels are strict carnivores; some other animals in the suborder Caniformia are omnivores. They primarily feed on pikas and voles; they have an important ecological role in reducing or limiting the population numbers of these rodents. Muskrats, rabbits, ground squirrels, small birds, lizards, frogs, fish, and insects are also found in their diet.

== Predation ==
Although no predators for this species have been reported, their main predators likely are large birds.

== Threats ==
Some threats causing the weasel to be considered near-threatened include habitat change, mainly caused by human development, and other dangers, such as traffic on roads, which can reduce their population. Overgrazing by cattle, goats, and sheep causes the prey of the weasel to diminish because their hiding spots and food are reduced.

== Conservation ==
The mountain weasel is listed in appendix III of the Convention on International Trade in Endangered Species. The category in which it is included consists of 45 species that are protected in at least one country which has asked for assistance in controlling the trade of that animal to safeguard resources for the future. The mountain weasel is also listed in the Wildlife Protection Act of 1972 in schedule II part II by the government of India, which states the animal receives absolute protection and offenders are prescribed the highest of penalties. Penalties may include three to seven years of imprisonment or a $25,000 fine.

To initiate a plan to set a nature reserve, construction, staffing, access development, and research and monitoring of the species it intends to protect and preserve are required. Sometimes, it is difficult to achieve all of these requirements. For example, nature preserves were proposed in China in the Yeniugou and Xiugou valleys. Unfortunately, the plans were denied by the authorities because they viewed it as an attempt to direct the government funds to Golmud, China where these valleys are located.

However, a successful nature reserve includes the Altai weasel in Kazakhstan. The West Altai State Nature Reserve was created to preserve and protect the ecosystem of the mountains and Altai forests it surrounds. It is the biggest nature reserve in Kazakhstan, and includes about 52 species of mammals, including the Altai weasel and also the food of the weasel, the pika.

Although no specific conservation strategy or program is dedicated to the Altai weasel, many other programs include it or it gains advantage. For example, the Kazakhstan nature reserve protects many different species. Also, programs that protect pikas and other small mammals also help protect the weasel; Sanjiangyuan, Changtang and Kekexili nature reserves in China are in this category. Another approach to conserving this animal would be to review conservation strategies of other species in the same genus. Population declines in Mustela lutrola, the European mink, are similar to the Altai weasel – primarily caused by habitat destruction, but also from diseases. A program was established in Russia to help conserve this species by captive breeding and reintroduction; the goal was to breed minks in captivity research stations.
