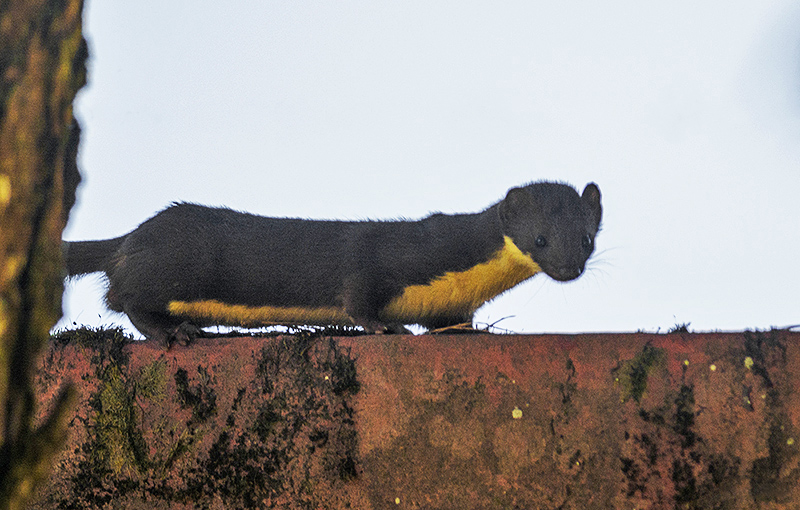
- At Shillong, Meghalaya, India

Conservation status
- Least Concern (IUCN 3.1)
- CITES Appendix III

Scientific classification
- Kingdom: Animalia
- Phylum: Chordata
- Class: Mammalia
- Order: Carnivora
- Family: Mustelidae
- Genus: Mustela
- Species: M. kathiah

Binomial name
- Mustela kathiah Hodgson, 1835
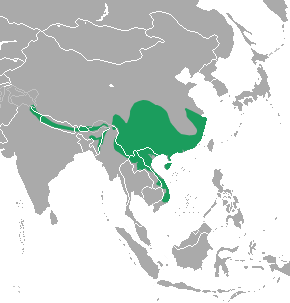
- Yellow-bellied weasel range

= Yellow-bellied weasel =

Species of carnivore

The yellow-bellied weasel (Mustela kathiah) is a species of weasel that inhabits pine forests in central and eastern Asia.

== Description ==
The species is named for its yellow-colored underbelly; the upperside of the body and the tail are of a dark brown. Body length is 9.8–10.6 inches (25–27 cm). The tail of 4.9–5.9 inches (12–15 cm) is about half as long as the body. Mean weight is about 3.3 pounds (1.5 kg).

== Taxonomy ==
Two subspecies are recognized: M. k. caporiaccoi (de Beaux, 1935) and M. k. kathiah (Hodgson, 1835).

== Distribution and habitat ==
The yellow-bellied weasel occurs in Bhutan, Burma, China, India, Laos, Nepal, Pakistan, Thailand and Vietnam. It inhabits forested habitats at elevations of 1,000–2,000 m (3,300–6,600 ft), but moves down to lower elevations in winter; in winter it may come down lower than 1,000 m (3,300 ft).

== Ecology ==
Yellow-bellied weasels eat birds, mice, rats, voles, and other small mammals.

Yellow-bellied weasels first build a den in the ground. Breeding occurs annually. Mating occurs in late spring or early summer. Females are pregnant for about ten months. The female gives birth to 3–18 kits in April or May. By the time the kits are eight weeks old, they are ready to go out and hunt on their own.
