= List of mustelids =

Species in mammal family Mustelidae

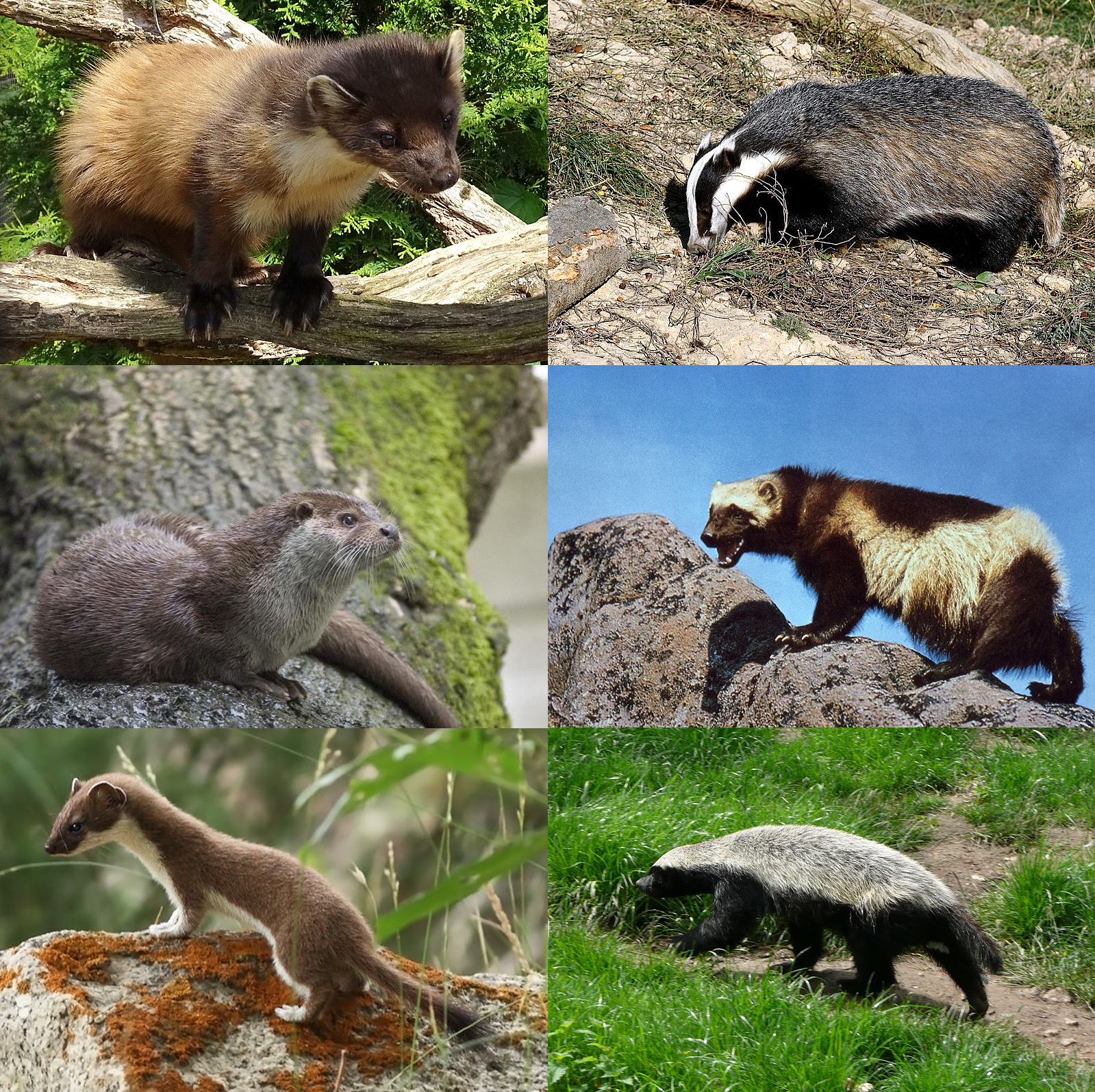
Six extant mustelid genera left-to-right, top-to-bottom: Martes, Meles, Lutra, Gulo, Mustela, and Mellivora

Mustelidae is a family of mammals in the order Carnivora, which includes weasels, badgers, otters, ferrets, martens, minks, and wolverines, and many other extant and extinct genera. A member of this family is called a mustelid; Mustelidae is the largest family in Carnivora, and its extant species are divided into eight subfamilies. They are found on all continents except Antarctica and Australia, and are a diverse family; sizes range, including tails, from the widespread 17 cm (7 in) least weasel to the 1.8-meter (6 ft) giant otter of Amazonian South America. Habitats vary widely as well, from the arboreal marten to the fossorial European badger to the marine sea otter. Population sizes are largely unknown, though two species, the sea mink and Japanese otter, were hunted to extinction in 1894 and 1979, respectively, and several other species are endangered. Some species have been domesticated, e.g. the ferret and some populations of the South American tayra. Mustelidae is one of the oldest families in Carnivora; early mustelids first appeared around 28–33 million years ago.

The 23 genera and 62 extant species of Mustelidae are split into 8 subfamilies: Guloninae, martens and wolverines; Helictidinae, ferret-badgers; Ictonychinae, African polecats and grisons; Lutrinae, otters; Melinae, Eurasian badgers; Mellivorinae, the honey badger; Mustelinae, weasels and minks; and Taxidiinae, the American badger. In addition to the extant subfamilies, Mustelidae includes three extinct subfamilies designated as Leptarctinae, Mustelavinae, and Oligobuninae. Extinct species have also been placed into all of the extant subfamilies besides Helictidinae, in both extant and extinct genera; around 200 extinct Mustelidae species have been found, as well as fossil genera not given a species name, though due to ongoing research and discoveries the exact number and categorization is not fixed.

== Conventions ==
IUCN Red List categories
Conservation status
- EX: Extinct (2 species)
- EW: Extinct in the wild (0 species)
- CR: Critically endangered (1 species)
- EN: Endangered (7 species)
- VU: Vulnerable (6 species)
- NT: Near threatened (7 species)
- LC: Least concern (39 species)

Other categories
- DD: Data deficient (1 species)
- NE: Not evaluated (1 species)

The author citation for the species or genus is given after the scientific name; parentheses around the author citation indicate that this was not the original taxonomic placement. Conservation status codes listed follow the International Union for Conservation of Nature (IUCN) Red List of Threatened Species. Range maps are provided wherever possible; if a range map is not available, a description of the mustelid's range is provided. Ranges are based on the IUCN Red List for that species unless otherwise noted. All extinct species or subspecies listed alongside extant species went extinct after 1500 CE, and are indicated by a dagger symbol "†". Population figures are rounded to the nearest hundred.

== Classification ==
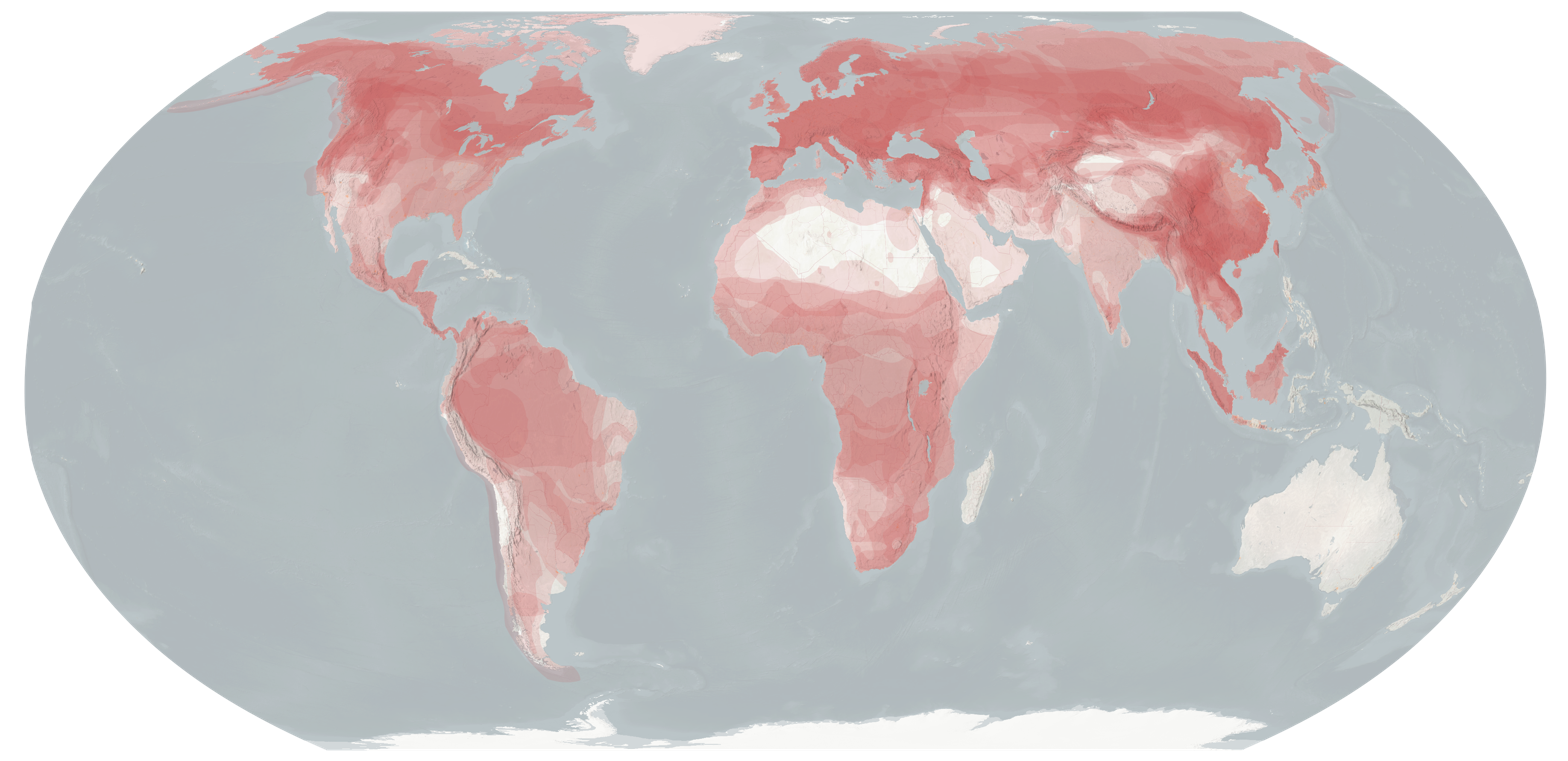
Mustelidae Distribution

The family Mustelidae consists of 62 extant species belonging to 23 genera and divided into hundreds of subspecies, as well the extinct sea mink and Japanese otter, which are the only mustelid species to become extinct since prehistoric times. This does not include hybrid species or extinct prehistoric species. Modern molecular studies indicate that the 23 genera can be grouped into 8 subfamilies. Some prior classification schemes divided the family solely between the aquatic otters and all other species.

Subfamily Guloninae (Martens and wolverines)

- Genus Eira: one species
- Genus Gulo: one species
- Genus Martes: seven species
- Genus Pekania: one species

Subfamily Helictidinae (Ferret-badgers)

- Genus Melogale: five species

Subfamily Ictonychinae (African polecats and grisons)

- Genus Galictis: two species
- Genus Ictonyx: two species
- Genus Lyncodon: one species
- Genus Poecilogale: one species
- Genus Vormela: one species

Subfamily Lutrinae (Otters)

- Genus Aonyx: three species
- Genus Enhydra: one species
- Genus Hydrictis: one species
- Genus Lontra: four species
- Genus Lutra: three species
- Genus Lutrogale: one species
- Genus Pteronura: one species

Subfamily Melinae (Eurasian badgers)

- Genus Arctonyx: three species
- Genus Meles: three species

Subfamily Mellivorinae (Honey badger)

- Genus Mellivora: one species

Subfamily Mustelinae (Weasels and minks)

- Genus Mustela: fifteen species
- Genus Neogale: five species

Subfamily Taxidiinae (American badger)

- Genus Taxidea: one species

== Mustelids ==
The following classification is based on the taxonomy described by the reference work Mammal Species of the World (2005), with augmentation by generally accepted proposals made since using molecular phylogenetic analysis, as supported by both the IUCN and the American Society of Mammalogists. This includes reclassifying Guloninae, Helictidinae, Ictonychinae, Melinae, Mellivorinae, and Taxidiinae as subfamilies rather than as part of a paraphyletic group with Mustelinae.

=== Subfamily Guloninae ===
Genus Eira – Hamilton Smith, 1842 – one species
| Common name | Scientific name and subspecies | Range | Size and ecology | IUCN status and estimated population |
|---|---|---|---|---|
| Tayra | E. barbara (Linnaeus, 1758) Seven subspecies: E. b. barbara; E. b. inserta; E. b. madeirensis; E. b. peruana; E. b. poliocephala; E. b. senex; E. b. sinuensis | Central America, Trinidad in the Caribbean, and northern South America | Size: 60–70 cm (24–28 in) long, plus 35–45 cm (14–18 in) tail Habitat: Forest and savanna Diet: Primarily eats fruit, carrion, small vertebrates, insects, and honey | LC Unknown |

Genus Gulo – Pallas, 1780 – one species
| Common name | Scientific name and subspecies | Range | Size and ecology | IUCN status and estimated population |
|---|---|---|---|---|
| Wolverine | G. gulo (Linnaeus, 1758) Two subspecies: G. g. luscus (American wolverine); G. g. gulo (Eurasian wolverine) | Arctic North America, Europe, and Asia | Size: 70–105 cm (28–41 in) long, plus 18–26 cm (7–10 in) tail Habitat: Rocky areas, shrubland, forest, and grassland Diet: Primarily eats carrion and small to large mammals | LC Unknown |

Genus Martes – Pinel, 1792 – seven species
| Common name | Scientific name and subspecies | Range | Size and ecology | IUCN status and estimated population |
|---|---|---|---|---|
| American marten | M. americana (Turton, 1806) Fourteen subspecies: M. a. abieticola; M. a. abietinoides; M. a. actuosa; M. a. americana; M. a. atrata (Newfoundland pine marten); M. a. brumalis; M. a. caurina; M. a. humboldtensis (Humboldt marten); M. a. kenaiensis; M. a. nesophila; M. a. origenes; M. a. sierrae; M. a. vancouverensis; M. a. vulpina | Northern North America (includes range of Pacific marten) | Size: 46–66 cm (18–26 in) long, plus 13–16 cm (5–6 in) tail Habitat: Forest Diet: Primarily eats rodents and small mammals, as well as birds, insects, fruit, and carrion | LC Unknown |
| Beech marten | M. foina (Erxleben, 1777) Eleven subspecies: M. f. bosniaca (Balkan beech marten); M. f. bunites (Cretan beech marten); M. f. foina (European beech marten); M. f. intermedia (Middle Asian beech marten); M. f. kozlovi (Tibetan beech marten); M. f. mediterranea (Iberian beech marten); M. f. milleri (Rhodes beech marten); M. f. nehringi (Caucasian beech marten); M. f. rosanowi (Crimean beech marten); M. f. syriaca (Syrian beech marten); M. f. toufoeus (Lhasa beech marten) | Europe and central Asia | Size: 40–50 cm (16–20 in) long, plus 22–30 cm (9–12 in) tail Habitat: Forest, rocky areas, and shrubland Diet: Primarily eats rodents and small mammals, as well as birds, insects, fruit, and carrion | LC Unknown |
| European pine marten | M. martes (Linnaeus, 1758) Seven subspecies: M. m. borealis; M. m. latinorum; M. m. lorenzi; M. m. minoricensis; M. m. notialis; M. m. ruthena; M. m. uralensis | Europe and west Asia | Size: 48–58 cm (19–23 in) long, plus 16–28 cm (6–11 in) tail Habitat: Forest and shrubland Diet: Primarily eats small mammals, birds, and amphibians, as well as carrion | LC Unknown |
| Japanese marten | M. melampus (Wagner, 1841) Two subspecies: M. m. melampus; M. m. tsuensis | Japan (M. m. melampus in green, M. m. tsuensis in red (Tsushima Island)) | Size: 47–55 cm (19–22 in) long, plus 17–22 cm (7–9 in) tail Habitat: Forest and shrubland Diet: Primarily eats fruit, small mammals, and insects | LC Unknown |
| Nilgiri marten | M. gwatkinsii Horsfield, 1851 | Parts of southern India | Size: 55–65 cm (22–26 in) long, plus 40–45 cm (16–18 in) tail Habitat: Forest and grassland Diet: Primarily eats birds, small mammals, and insects | VU 1,000 |
| Sable | M. zibellina (Linnaeus, 1758) Sixteen subspecies: M. z. angarensis; M. z. arsenjevi; M. z. averini; M. z. brachyura; M. z. ilimpiensis; M. z. jakutensis; M. z. kamtschadalica; M. z. obscura; M. z. princeps; M. z. sahalinensis; M. z. sajanensis; M. z. schantaricus; M. z. tomensis; M. z. tungussensis; M. z. yeniseensis; M. z. zibellina | Large parts of Russia | Size: 38–56 cm (15–22 in) long, plus 9–12 cm (4–5 in) tail Habitat: Forest Diet: Primarily eats small mammals, birds, nuts, and berries | LC 2 million |
| Yellow-throated marten | M. flavigula (Boddaert, 1785) Nine subspecies: M. f. borealis; M. f. chrysospila; M. f. flavigula; M. f. hainana; M. f. henrici; M. f. indochinensis; M. f. peninsularis; M. f. robinsoni; M. f. saba | Eastern and southeastern Asia | Size: 50–72 cm (20–28 in) long, plus 33–48 cm (13–19 in) tail Habitat: Forest and grassland Diet: Primarily eats birds, small mammals, and insects | LC Unknown |

Genus Pekania – Gray, 1865 – one species
| Common name | Scientific name and subspecies | Range | Size and ecology | IUCN status and estimated population |
|---|---|---|---|---|
| Fisher | P. pennanti (Erxleben, 1777) | Northern North America | Size: 75–120 cm (30–47 in) long, plus 31–41 cm (12–16 in) tail Habitat: Forest Diet: Primarily eats small to medium mammals, birds, and carrion | LC Unknown |

=== Subfamily Helictidinae ===
Genus Melogale – I. Saint-Hilaire, 1831 – five species
| Common name | Scientific name and subspecies | Range | Size and ecology | IUCN status and estimated population |
|---|---|---|---|---|
| Bornean ferret-badger | M. everetti (Thomas, 1895) | Small parts of Borneo | Size: 33–44 cm (13–17 in) long, plus 15–23 cm (6–9 in) tail Habitat: Forest and shrubland Diet: Primarily eats invertebrates, amphibians, insects, fruit, and carrion | EN Unknown |
| Burmese ferret-badger | M. personata I. Saint-Hilaire, 1831 Five subspecies: M. p. laotum; M. p. nipalensis; M. p. personata; M. p. pierrei; M. p. tonquinia | Southeast Asia | Size: 33–44 cm (13–17 in) long, plus 15–23 cm (6–9 in) tail Habitat: Grassland, shrubland, and forest Diet: Primarily eats insects and snails, as well as small mammals, frogs, lizards, carrion, birds, eggs, and fruit | LC Unknown |
| Chinese ferret-badger | M. moschata (Gray, 1831) Seven subspecies: M. m. ferreogrisea; M. m. hainanensis; M. m. millsi; M. m. moschata; M. m. sorella; M. m. subaurantiaca; M. m. taxilla | East Asia | Size: 30–43 cm (12–17 in) long, plus 15–21 cm (6–8 in) tail Habitat: Forest, shrubland, and grassland Diet: Primarily eats insects, frogs, and carrion | LC Unknown |
| Javan ferret-badger | M. orientalis (Blanford, 1888) Two subspecies: M. o. orientalis; M. o. sundaicus | Parts of Java and Bali | Size: 35–40 cm (14–16 in) long, plus 14–17 cm (6–7 in) tail Habitat: Shrubland and forest Diet: Primarily eats invertebrates and insects | LC Unknown |
| Vietnam ferret-badger | M. cucphuongensis T. Nadler, 2011 | Vietnam | Size: Unknown Habitat: Forest Diet: Unknown | DD Unknown |

=== Subfamily Ictonychinae ===
Genus Galictis – Bell, 1826 – two species
| Common name | Scientific name and subspecies | Range | Size and ecology | IUCN status and estimated population |
|---|---|---|---|---|
| Greater grison | G. vittata (Schreber, 1776) Four subspecies: G. v. andina; G. v. brasiliensis; G. v. canaster; G. v. vittata | Northern South America and Central America | Size: 60–76 cm (24–30 in) long, including tail Habitat: Forest and grassland Diet: Primarily eats small mammals, birds, lizards, amphibians, eggs, and fruit | LC Unknown |
| Lesser grison | G. cuja (Molina, 1782) Four subspecies: G. c. cuja; G. c. furax; G. c. huronax; G. c. luteola | Southern South America | Size: 28–51 cm (11–20 in) long, plus 12–20 cm (5–8 in) tail Habitat: Inland wetlands, forest, grassland, and savanna Diet: Primarily eats small lagomorphs and rodents, as well as birds, frogs, lizards, snakes, and eggs | LC Unknown |

Genus Ictonyx – Kaup, 1835 – two species
| Common name | Scientific name and subspecies | Range | Size and ecology | IUCN status and estimated population |
|---|---|---|---|---|
| Striped polecat | I. striatus (Molina, 1782) Nineteen subspecies: I. s. albescens; I. s. arenarius; I. s. elgonis; I. s. erythreae; I. s. ghansiensis; I. s. giganteus; I. s. intermedius; I. s. kalaharicus; I. s. lancasteri; I. s. limpopoensis; I. s. maximus; I. s. obscuratus; I. s. orangiae; I. s. ovamboensis; I. s. pretoriae; I. s. senegalensis; I. s. shoae; I. s. shortridgei; I. s. striatus | Central, Southern, and sub-Saharan Africa | Size: 28–30 cm (11–12 in) long, plus 20–30 cm (8–12 in) tail Habitat: Grassland, savanna, desert, and shrubland Diet: Primarily eats insects | LC Unknown |
| Saharan striped polecat | I. libycus (Hemprich and Ehrenberg, 1833) Four subspecies: I. l. libyca; I. l. multivittata; I. l. oralis; I. l. rothschildi | Northern, western, and southern edges of the Sahara | Size: 40–47 cm (16–19 in) long, plus 16–19 cm (6–7 in) tail Habitat: Shrubland and desert Diet: Primarily eats rodents, small mammals, birds, fish, and insects | LC Unknown |

Genus Lyncodon – Gervais, 1845 – one species
| Common name | Scientific name and subspecies | Range | Size and ecology | IUCN status and estimated population |
|---|---|---|---|---|
| Patagonian weasel | L. patagonicus (Blainville, 1842) Two subspecies: L. p. patagonicus; L. p. thomasi | Argentina | Size: 30–35 cm (12–14 in) long, plus 6–9 cm (2–4 in) tail Habitat: Shrubland, grassland, and forest Diet: Primarily eats rodents and birds | LC Unknown |

Genus Poecilogale – Thomas, 1883 – one species
| Common name | Scientific name and subspecies | Range | Size and ecology | IUCN status and estimated population |
|---|---|---|---|---|
| African striped weasel | P. albinucha (Gray, 1864) Five subspecies: P. a. albinucha; P. a. bechuanae; P. a. doggetti; P. a. lebombo; P. a. transvaalensis | Southern Africa | Size: 25–36 cm (10–14 in) long, plus 13–23 cm (5–9 in) tail Habitat: Shrubland, forest, savanna, and grassland Diet: Primarily eats small mammals, rodents, and birds, as well as snakes and insects | LC Unknown |

Genus Vormela – Blasius, 1884 – one species
| Common name | Scientific name and subspecies | Range | Size and ecology | IUCN status and estimated population |
|---|---|---|---|---|
| Marbled polecat | V. peregusna (Güldenstädt, 1864) Five subspecies: V. p. koshewnikowi; V. p. negans; V. p. pallidior; V. p. peregusna; V. p. syriaca | Southeast Europe and central Asia | Size: 28–48 cm (11–19 in) long, plus 14–20 cm (6–8 in) tail Habitat: Desert, rocky areas, grassland, and shrubland Diet: Primarily eats rodents and birds | VU Unknown |

=== Subfamily Lutrinae ===
Genus Aonyx – Lesson, 1827 – three species
| Common name | Scientific name and subspecies | Range | Size and ecology | IUCN status and estimated population |
|---|---|---|---|---|
| African clawless otter | A. capensis Schinz, 1821 Five subspecies: A. c. capensis (Cape clawless otter); A. c. hindei; A. c. meneleki; A. c. microdon; A. c. philippsi | Sub-Saharan Africa | Size: 72–95 cm (28–37 in) long, plus 40–60 cm (16–24 in) tail Habitat: Forest, inland wetlands, neritic marine, coastal marine, intertidal marine, and grassland Diet: Primarily eats crabs and lobsters, as well as frogs, fish, and insects | NT Unknown |
| Asian small-clawed otter | A. cinereus (Illiger, 1815) Three subspecies: A. c. cinereus; A. c. concolor; A. c. nirnai | Southeast Asia | Size: 40–63 cm (16–25 in) long, plus 25–35 cm (10–14 in) tail Habitat: Intertidal marine, coastal marine, inland wetlands, forest, shrubland, neritic marine, and grassland Diet: Primarily eats crabs, molluscs, insects, and small fish, as well as rodents, snakes, and amphibians | VU Unknown |
| Congo clawless otter | A. congicus (Lönnberg, 1910) | Sub-Saharan Africa | Size: 79–95 cm (31–37 in) long, plus 50–56 cm (20–22 in) tail Habitat: Forest, inland wetlands, and marine Diet: Unknown | NT Unknown |

Genus Enhydra – Fleming, 1828 – one species
| Common name | Scientific name and subspecies | Range | Size and ecology | IUCN status and estimated population |
|---|---|---|---|---|
| Sea otter | E. lutris (Linnaeus, 1758) Three subspecies: E. l. kenyoni (Northern sea otter); E. l. lutris (Asian sea otter); E. l. nereis (Southern sea otter) | Northern Pacific coasts | Size: 55–130 cm (22–51 in) long, plus 12–33 cm (5–13 in) tail Habitat: Neritic marine and oceanic marine Diet: Primarily eats marine invertebrates, as well as fish | EN 125,000 |

Genus Hydrictis – Pocock, 1921 – one species
| Common name | Scientific name and subspecies | Range | Size and ecology | IUCN status and estimated population |
|---|---|---|---|---|
| Spotted-necked otter | H. maculicollis (Lichtenstein, 1835) | Much of sub-Saharan Africa | Size: 57–69 cm (22–27 in) long, plus 33–44 cm (13–17 in) tail Habitat: Inland wetlands, neritic marine, forest, coastal marine, and intertidal marine Diet: Primarily eats frogs, crabs and small water birds | NT Unknown |

Genus Lontra – Gray, 1843 – four species
| Common name | Scientific name and subspecies | Range | Size and ecology | IUCN status and estimated population |
|---|---|---|---|---|
| North American river otter | L. canadensis (Schreber, 1777) Seven subspecies: L. c. canadensis; L. c. kodiacensis; L. c. lataxina; L. c. mira; L. c. pacifica; L. c. periclyzomae; L. c. sonora | United States and Canada, possibly Mexico | Size: 66–107 cm (26–42 in) long, plus 31–46 cm (12–18 in) tail Habitat: Inland wetlands, intertidal marine, neritic marine, and coastal marine Diet: Primarily eats fish, as well as amphibians and crustaceans | LC Unknown |
| Southern river otter | L. provocax (Thomas, 1908) | Southern Chile and Argentina | Size: 57–70 cm (22–28 in) long, plus 35–46 cm (14–18 in) tail Habitat: Inland wetlands, coastal marine, neritic marine, and intertidal marine Diet: Primarily eats fish and crustaceans | EN Unknown |
| Neotropical otter | L. longicaudis (Olfers, 1818) Three subspecies: L. l. annectens; L. l. enudris; L. l. longicaudis | South and Central America, Trinidad in the Caribbean | Size: 50–79 cm (20–31 in) long, plus 37–57 cm (15–22 in) tail Habitat: Coastal marine, inland wetlands, neritic marine, and intertidal marine Diet: Primarily eats fish, as well as crustaceans, insects, amphibians, and molluscs | NT Unknown |
| Marine otter | L. felina (Molina, 1782) | West coast of South America | Size: 57–79 cm (22–31 in) long, plus 30–36 cm (12–14 in) tail Habitat: Coastal marine, intertidal marine, oceanic marine, and neritic marine Diet: Primarily eats crustaceans and molluscs, as well as fish, birds, and small mammals | EN Unknown |

Genus Lutra – Brisson, 1762 – three species
| Common name | Scientific name and subspecies | Range | Size and ecology | IUCN status and estimated population |
|---|---|---|---|---|
| Eurasian otter | L. lutra (Linnaeus, 1758) Eleven subspecies: L. l. angustifrons; L. l. aurobrunneus; L. l. barang; L. l. chinensis; L. l. hainana; L. l. kutab; L. l. lutra; L. l. meridionalis; L. l. monticolus; L. l. nair; L. l. seistanica | Europe, North Africa, and large regions of Asia | Size: 57–70 cm (22–28 in) long, plus 35–40 cm (14–16 in) tail Habitat: Inland wetlands, forest, grassland, coastal marine, neretic marine, intertidal marine, and shrubland Diet: Primarily eats fish, as well as insects, reptiles, amphibians, birds, small mammals, and crustaceans | NT 57,800–361,200 |
| Hairy-nosed otter | L. sumatrana (Gray, 1865) | Scattered parts of southeast Asia | Size: 50–82 cm (20–32 in) long, plus 35–50 cm (14–20 in) tail Habitat: Inland wetlands, neritic marine, shrubland, grassland, forest, coastal marine, and intertidal marine Diet: Primarily eats fish and water snakes, as well as frogs, lizards, turtles, and crabs | EN Unknown |
| Japanese otter† | L. nippon Imaizumi, Yoshiyuki, 1989 | formerly Japan (extinct) | Size: 65–80 cm (26–31 in) long, plus 45–50 cm (18–20 in) tail Habitat: Inland wetlands, neritic marine, shrubland, grassland, forest, coastal marine, and intertidal marine Diet: Fish, crabs, shrimp, eels, beetles, fruit | EX 0 |

Genus Lutrogale – (Gray, 1865) – one species
| Common name | Scientific name and subspecies | Range | Size and ecology | IUCN status and estimated population |
|---|---|---|---|---|
| Smooth-coated otter | L. perspicillata Geoffroy Saint-Hilaire, 1826 Three subspecies: L. p. maxwelli (Iraq smooth–coated otter); L. p. perspicillata; L. p. sindica | Iraq, South and southeast Asia | Size: 65–79 cm (26–31 in) long, plus 40–50 cm (16–20 in) tail Habitat: Inland wetlands, forest, grassland, coastal marine, neritic marine, intertidal marine, and shrubland Diet: Primarily eats fish, as well as shrimp, crabs, and insects | VU Unknown |

Genus Pteronura – Gray, 1837 – one species
| Common name | Scientific name and subspecies | Range | Size and ecology | IUCN status and estimated population |
|---|---|---|---|---|
| Giant otter | P. brasiliensis (Gmelin, 1788) Two subspecies: P. b. brasiliensis; P. b. paraguensis | North and central South America | Size: 96–123 cm (38–48 in) long, plus 45–65 cm (18–26 in) tail Habitat: Inland wetlands, coastal marine, neritic marine, and forest Diet: Primarily eats fish, as well as caiman and turtles | EN Unknown |

=== Subfamily Melinae ===
Genus Arctonyx – F.Cuvier, 1825 – three species
| Common name | Scientific name and subspecies | Range | Size and ecology | IUCN status and estimated population |
|---|---|---|---|---|
| Greater hog badger | A. collaris F. Cuvier, 1825 Four subspecies: A. c. collaris (Greater hog badger); A. c. consul (Burmese hog badger); A. c. dictator (Indochinese hog badger) | East and southeast Asia (image includes albogularis and hoevenii) | Size: 65–104 cm (26–41 in) long, plus 19–29 cm (7–11 in) tail Habitat: Forest, grassland, shrubland, and savanna Diet: Believed to primarily eat worms | VU Unknown |
| Northern hog badger | A. albogularis (Blyth, 1853) Two subspecies: A. a. albogularis (Greater hog badger); A. a. leucolaemus (Chinese hog badger) | South and East Asia (image includes collaris and hoevenii) | Size: 55–70 cm (22–28 in) long, plus 11–22 cm (4–9 in) tail Habitat: Forest, bushland, agricultural area, wasteland, and montane grassland Diet: Small vertebrates, invertebrates, and plant material | LC Unknown |
| Sumatran hog badger | A. hoevenii (Blyth, 1853) | Sumatra | Size: 51–71 cm (20–28 in) long, plus 8–18 cm (3–7 in) tail Habitat: Montane and mossy forests, montane grasslands Diet: Believed to primarily eat invertebrates | LC Unknown |

Genus Meles – Brisson, 1762 – three species
| Common name | Scientific name and subspecies | Range | Size and ecology | IUCN status and estimated population |
|---|---|---|---|---|
| Asian badger | M. leucurus (Hodgson, 1847) Five subspecies: M. l. amurensis (Amur badger); M. l. arenarius (Kazakh badger); M. l. leucurus (Common sand badger); M. l. sibiricus (Siberian badger); M. l. tianschanensis (Tien Shan badger) | Central and east Asia | Size: 49–70 cm (19–28 in) long, plus 13–21 cm (5–8 in) tail Habitat: Shrubland, grassland, and forest Diet: Omnivorous; eats fruit, nuts, plants, earthworms, insects, eggs, carrion, and small mammals | LC Unknown |
| European badger | M. meles (Linnaeus, 1758) Four subspecies: M. m. heptneri (Kizlyar badger); M. m. marianensis (Iberian badger); M. m. meles (Common badger); M. m. milleri (Norwegian badger) | Europe (map also includes range of Caucasian badger) | Size: 56–90 cm (22–35 in) long, plus 11–20 cm (4–8 in) tail Habitat: Grassland, forest, desert, and shrubland Diet: Omnivorous; eats fruit, nuts, plants, earthworms, insects, eggs, carrion, and small mammals | LC Unknown |
| Japanese badger | M. anakuma Temminck, 1844 | Japan | Size: 70–79 cm (28–31 in) long, plus 14–20 cm (6–8 in) tail Habitat: Forest Diet: Primarily eats earthworms and insects, as well as fruit | LC Unknown |

=== Subfamily Mellivorinae ===
Genus Mellivora – Gottlieb Conrad Christian Storr, 1780 – one species
| Common name | Scientific name and subspecies | Range | Size and ecology | IUCN status and estimated population |
|---|---|---|---|---|
| Honey badger | M. capensis (Schreber, 1776) Twelve subspecies: M. c. abyssinica (Ethiopian ratel); M. c. buechneri (Turkmenian ratel); M. c. capensis (Cape ratel); M. c. concisa (Lake Chad ratel); M. c. cottoni (Black ratel); M. c. inaurita (Nepalese ratel); M. c. indica (Indian ratel); M. c. leuconota (White-backed ratel); M. c. maxwelli (Kenyan ratel); M. c. pumilio (Arabian ratel); M. c. signata (Speckled ratel); M. c. wilsoni (Persian ratel) | Africa, Middle East, and India | Size: 73–96 cm (29–38 in) long, plus 14–23 cm (6–9 in) tail Habitat: Forest, shrubland, savanna, and desert Diet: Primarily eats smaller mammals | LC Unknown |

=== Subfamily Mustelinae ===
Genus Mustela – Linnaeus, 1758 – fifteen species
| Common name | Scientific name and subspecies | Range | Size and ecology | IUCN status and estimated population |
|---|---|---|---|---|
| Back-striped weasel | M. strigidorsa Gray, 1855 | Parts of southeast Asia | Size: 30–36 cm (12–14 in) long, plus 18–20 cm (7–8 in) tail Habitat: Forest and shrubland Diet: Unknown, but believed to eat rodents and insects | LC Unknown |
| Black-footed ferret | M. nigripes (Audubon, 1851) | Three small areas in central United States | Size: 50–53 cm (20–21 in) long, plus 11–13 cm (4–5 in) tail Habitat: Shrubland and grassland Diet: Primarily eats prairie dogs | EN 200 |
| Egyptian weasel | M. subpalmata Hemprich, 1833 | Nile river delta in Egypt | Size: 32–43 cm (13–17 in) long, plus 9–13 cm (4–5 in) tail Habitat: Urban, marine Diet: Primarily eats fruit and vegetables, birds, and insects | LC Unknown |
| European mink | M. lutreola (Linnaeus, 1761) Seven subspecies: M. l. biedermanni (French mink); M. l. binominata; M. l. cylipena (Middle European mink); M. l. lutreola (Northern mink); M. l. novikovi (Middle Russian mink); M. l. transsylvanica (Carpathian mink); M. l. turovi (Caucasian mink) | Scattered parts of west Asia and west Europe | Size: 35–43 cm (14–17 in) long, plus 15–19 cm (6–7 in) tail Habitat: Inland wetlands Diet: Primarily eats amphibians, crustaceans, fish, small mammals, insects, and birds | CR Unknown |
| European polecat | M. putorius Linnaeus, 1758 Six subspecies: M. p. anglia (Welsh polecat); M. p. aureola (Mediterranean polecat); M. p. caledoniae (Scottish polecat)†; M. p. mosquensis (Middle Russian polecat); M. p. putorius (Common polecat); M. p. rothschildi (Carpathian polecat) | Europe and west Asia | Size: 29–46 cm (11–18 in) long, plus 8–17 cm (3–7 in) tail Habitat: Inland wetlands, coastal marine, grassland, forest, and shrubland Diet: Primarily eats lagomorphs, rodents, amphibians, and other vertebrates, as well as invertebrates and carrion | LC Unknown |
| Ferret | M. furo Linnaeus, 1758 | Worldwide distribution (domesticated) | Size: 20–46 cm (8–18 in) long, plus 7–19 cm (3–7 in) tail Habitat: Domesticated Diet: Primarily eats small mammals | NE Unknown |
| Indonesian mountain weasel | M. lutreolina Robinson, 1917 | Scattered parts of Indonesia | Size: 27–33 cm (11–13 in) long, plus 13–17 cm (5–7 in) tail Habitat: Shrubland and forest Diet: Primarily eats rodents, as well as small mammals, birds, amphibians, and eggs | LC Unknown |
| Japanese weasel | M. itatsi Temminck, 1844 | native to Japan, introduced to Russia (native range in blue, introduced in red (Hokkaido, Sakhalin)) | Size: 21–36 cm (8–14 in) long, plus 7–16 cm (3–6 in) tail Habitat: Shrubland, grassland, and forest Diet: Primarily eats rodents, insects, amphibians, and reptiles | NT Unknown |
| Least weasel | M. nivalis Linnaeus, 1766 Seventeen subspecies: M. n. allegheniensis (Allegheny weasel); M. n. boccamela (Transcaucasian weasel); M. n. campestris (Plains weasel); M. n. caucasica (Caucasian weasel); M. n. eskimo (Alaskan weasel); M. n. heptneri (Turkmenian weasel); M. n. mosanensis (Korean weasel); M. n. namiyei (Japanese weasel); M. n. nivalis (Common weasel); M. n. numidica (Mediterranean weasel); M. n. pallida (Montane Turkestan weasel); M. n. pygmaea (Siberian least weasel); M. n. rixosa (Bangs' weasel); M. n. rossica; M. n. russelliana (Sichuan weasel); M. n. stoliczkana; M. n. tonkinensis (Vietnamese weasel); M. n. vulgaris (Middle European weasel) | Europe, Asia, northern Africa, northern North America | Size: 11–26 cm (4–10 in) long, plus 1–9 cm (0–4 in) tail Habitat: Forest, inland wetlands, rocky areas, coastal marine, shrubland, and grassland Diet: Primarily eats rodents and other small mammals as well as eggs, lizards, frogs, salamanders, fish, worms, and carrion | LC Unknown |
| Malayan weasel | M. nudipes Desmarest, 1822 Two subspecies: M. n. leucocephalus; M. n. nudipes | Southeast Asia | Size: 30–36 cm (12–14 in) long, plus 24–26 cm (9–10 in) tail Habitat: Shrubland and forest Diet: Primarily eats rodents, as well as small birds, lizards, and insects | LC Unknown |
| Mountain weasel | M. altaica Pallas, 1811 Four subspecies: M. a. altaica; M. a. birulai; M. a. raddei; M. a. temon | Central and eastern Asia | Size: 22–29 cm (9–11 in) long, plus 9–15 cm (4–6 in) tail Habitat: Shrubland, rocky areas, and grassland Diet: Primarily eats pikas, rodents, small birds, lizards, and insects | NT Unknown |
| Siberian weasel | M. sibirica Pallas, 1773 Eleven subspecies: M. s. canigula (Tibetan kolonok); M. s. charbinensis (Manchurian kolonok); M. s. coreanus (Korean kolonok); M. s. davidiana (Taiwanese kolonok); M. s. fontanierii (North Chinese kolonok); M. s. hodgsoni (Hodgson's kolonok); M. s. manchurica (Far Eastern kolonok); M. s. moupinensis (Burmese kolonok); M. s. quelpartis (Quelpart kolonok); M. s. sibirica (Siberian kolonok); M. s. subhemachalana (Himalayan kolonok) | North-central and east Asia (native range in green, introduced in red (Japan)) | Size: 25–39 cm (10–15 in) long, plus 13–21 cm (5–8 in) tail Habitat: Grassland, shrubland, forest, and rocky areas Diet: Primarily eats small mammals, amphibians, fish, carrion, and pine nuts | LC Unknown |
| Steppe polecat | M. eversmanii Lesson, 1827 Seven subspecies: M. e. admirata (Chinese steppe polecat); M. e. amurensis (Amur steppe polecat); M. e. eversmanii (Petropavlov steppe polecat); M. e. hungarica (European steppe polecat); M. e. larvatus (Tibetan steppe polecat); M. e. michnoi (Baikal steppe polecat); M. e. talassicus (Turkestan steppe polecat) | Central Asia and eastern Europe | Size: 29–56 cm (11–22 in) long, plus 8–18 cm (3–7 in) tail Habitat: Grassland and shrubland Diet: Primarily eats rodents and pikas | LC Unknown |
| Stoat | M. erminea Linnaeus, 1758 37 subspecies: M. e. aestiva (Middle Russian stoat); M. e. alascensis (Junean stoat); M. e. anguinae (Vancouver Island stoat); M. e. arctica (Tundra stoat); M. e. augustidens; M. e. bangsi (Western Great Lakes stoat); M. e. celenda; M. e. cigognanii (Bonaparte's stoat); M. e. erminea (Northern stoat); M. e. fallenda; M. e. ferghanae (Fergana stoat); M. e. gulosa; M. e. haidarum (Queen Charlotte Islands stoat); M. e. hibernica (Irish stoat); M. e. initis; M. e. invicta; M. e. kadiacensis (Kodiak stoat); M. e. kaneii (East Siberian stoat); M. e. karaginensis (Karaginsky stoat); M. e. lymani (Altai stoat); M. e. martinoi; M. e. minima (Swiss stoat); M. e. mongolica (Gobi stoat); M. e. muricus (Southwestern stoat); M. e. nippon (Japanese stoat); M. e. ognevi; M. e. olympica (Olympic stoat); M. e. polaris (Polar stoat); M. e. richardsonii (Richardson's stoat); M. e. ricinae (Hebrides stoat); M. e. salva; M. e. seclusa; M. e. semplei (Baffin Island stoat); M. e. stabilis (British stoat); M. e. streatori; M. e. teberdina (Caucasian stoat); M. e. tobolica (Tobolsk stoat) | Europe, north Asia, northern North America, and Greenland (native range in green, introduced in red (New Zealand)); map includes range of American and haida ermines | Size: 17–33 cm (7–13 in) long, plus 4–12 cm (2–5 in) tail Habitat: Shrubland, inland wetlands, grassland, rocky areas, and forest Diet: Primarily eats small mammals, as well as fruit, earthworms, insects, eggs, and birds | LC Unknown |
| Yellow-bellied weasel | M. kathiah Hodgson, 1835 Two subspecies: M. k. caporiaccoi; M. k. kathiah | Himalayan mountains and east-southeast Asia | Size: 25–27 cm (10–11 in) long, plus 12–15 cm (5–6 in) tail Habitat: Forest, shrubland, and grassland Diet: Primarily eats rodents, as well as birds and small mammals | LC Unknown |

Genus Neogale – Gray, 1865 – five species
| Common name | Scientific name and subspecies | Range | Size and ecology | IUCN status and estimated population |
|---|---|---|---|---|
| Amazon weasel | N. africana (Desmarest, 1818) Two subspecies: N. a. africana; N. a. stolzmanni | Amazon basin | Size: 41–52 cm (16–20 in) long, plus 16–21 cm (6–8 in) tail Habitat: Inland wetlands and forest Diet: Unknown | LC Unknown |
| American mink | N. vison (Schreber, 1777) Fifteen subspecies: N. v. aestuarina (California lowland mink); N. v. aniakensis; N. v. energumenos (Western mink); N. v. evagor; N. v. evergladensis (Everglades mink); N. v. ingens (Alaskan mink); N. v. lacustris (Hudson Bay mink); N. v. letifera (Mississippi Valley mink); N. v. lowii; N. v. lutensis (Florida mink); N. v. melampeplus (Kenai mink); N. v. mink (Common mink); N. v. nesolestes (Island mink); N. v. vison (Eastern mink); N. v. vulgivaga (Southern mink) | Canada and United States; introduced to large areas in South America, Europe, and Asia (native range in red (North America), introduced in pink) | Size: 31–45 cm (12–18 in) long, plus 14–25 cm (6–10 in) tail Habitat: Inland wetlands, forest, and shrubland Diet: Primarily eats fish, amphibians, crustaceans, muskrats, and small mammals | LC Unknown |
| Colombian weasel | N. felipei (Izor and Torre, 1978) | Small area of northwest South America | Size: 32–39 cm (13–15 in) long, plus 10–14 cm (4–6 in) tail Habitat: Inland wetlands and forest Diet: Unknown, but believed to eat fish, small mammals, and insects | VU 1,300 |
| Long-tailed weasel | N. frenata (Lichtenstein, 1831) 42 subspecies: N. f. affinis; N. f. agilis; N. f. alleni (Black Hills long-tailed weasel); N. f. altifrontalis; N. f. arizonensis (Arizona long-tailed weasel); N. f. arthuri; N. f. aureoventris; N. f. boliviensis (Bolivian long-tailed weasel); N. f. costaricensis (Costa Rican long-tailed weasel); N. f. effera; N. f. frenata (Bridled weasel); N. f. goldmani (Chiapas long-tailed weasel); N. f. gracilis; N. f. helleri; N. f. inyoensis (Inyo long-tailed weasel); N. f. latirostra; N. f. leucoparia; N. f. longicauda (Common long-tailed weasel); N. f. macrophonius; N. f. munda; N. f. neomexicanus (New Mexico long-tailed weasel); N. f. nevadensis (Nevada long-tailed weasel); N. f. nicaraguae (Nicaraguan long-tailed weasel); N. f. nigriauris; N. f. notius; N. f. noveboracensis (New York long-tailed weasel); N. f. occisor; N. f. olivacea; N. f. oregonensis (Oregon long-tailed weasel); N. f. oribasus; N. f. panamensis (Panama long-tailed weasel); N. f. peninsulae (Florida long-tailed weasel); N. f. perda; N. f. perotae; N. f. primulina; N. f. pulchra; N. f. saturata (Cascade Mountains long-tailed weasel); N. f. spadix; N. f. texensis (Texas long-tailed weasel); N. f. tropicalis (Tropical long-tailed weasel); N. f. washingtoni (Washington long-tailed weasel); N. f. xanthogenys (California long-tailed weasel) | North America, Central America, and northern South America | Size: 28–42 cm (11–17 in) long, plus 11–30 cm (4–12 in) tail Habitat: Inland wetlands, grassland, and shrubland Diet: Primarily eats rodents and other small mammals | LC Unknown |
| Sea mink† | N. macrodon (Prentiss, 1903) | formerly northern New England coast in United States, Maritime Provinces in Canada | Size: Estimated to have been around 91 cm (36 in) long, plus 25 cm (10 in) tail Habitat: Intertidal marine, neritic marine, and coastal marine Diet: Primarily ate fish as well as molluscs | EX 0 |

=== Subfamily Taxidiinae ===
Genus Taxidea – Horsfield, 1839 – one species
| Common name | Scientific name and subspecies | Range | Size and ecology | IUCN status and estimated population |
|---|---|---|---|---|
| American badger | T. taxus (Schreber, 1777) Five subspecies: T. t. berlandieri (Texas badger); T. t. jacksoni (Jackson's badger); T. t. jeffersonii (British Columbia badger); T. t. marylandica (Maryland badger); T. t. taxus | Mexico, United States and southern Canada | Size: 42–72 cm (17–28 in) long, plus 10–16 cm (4–6 in) tail Habitat: Forest, grassland, and shrubland Diet: Primarily eats fossorial rodents, as well as scorpions, insects, snakes, lizards, and birds | LC Unknown |
