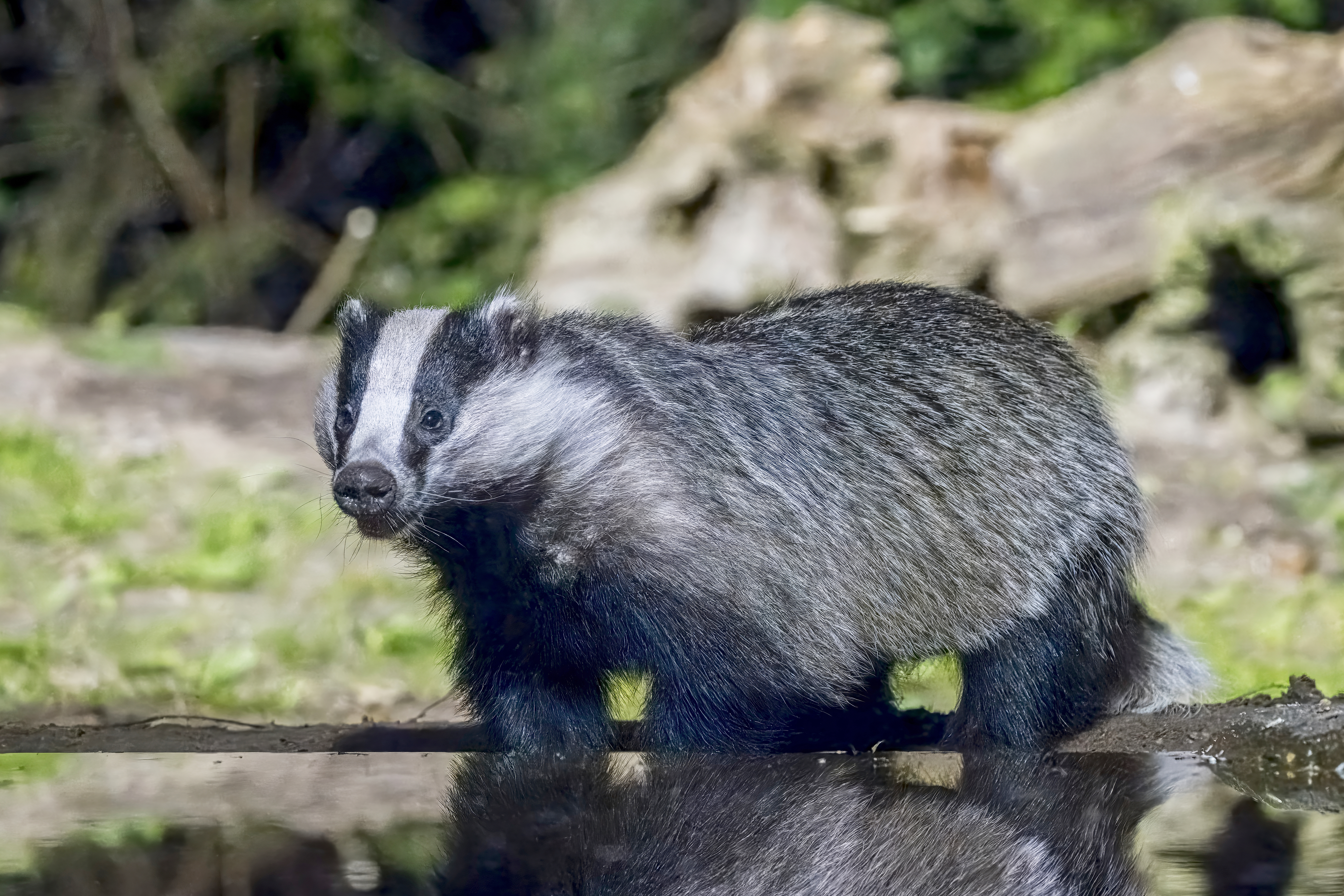
- European badger, M. m. taxus

Scientific classification
- Kingdom: Animalia
- Phylum: Chordata
- Class: Mammalia
- Infraclass: Placentalia
- Order: Carnivora
- Parvorder: Mustelida
- Superfamily: Musteloidea

Groups included
- genera of family Mustelidae: Arctonyx (hog badgers); Meles (Eurasian badgers); Melogale (ferret-badgers); Mellivora (honey badgers); †Chamitataxus (extinct North American badgers from the Miocene); †Pliotaxidea (extinct North American badgers from the Pliocene); Taxidea (modern North American badgers); genera of family Mephitidae: Mydaus (stink badgers)
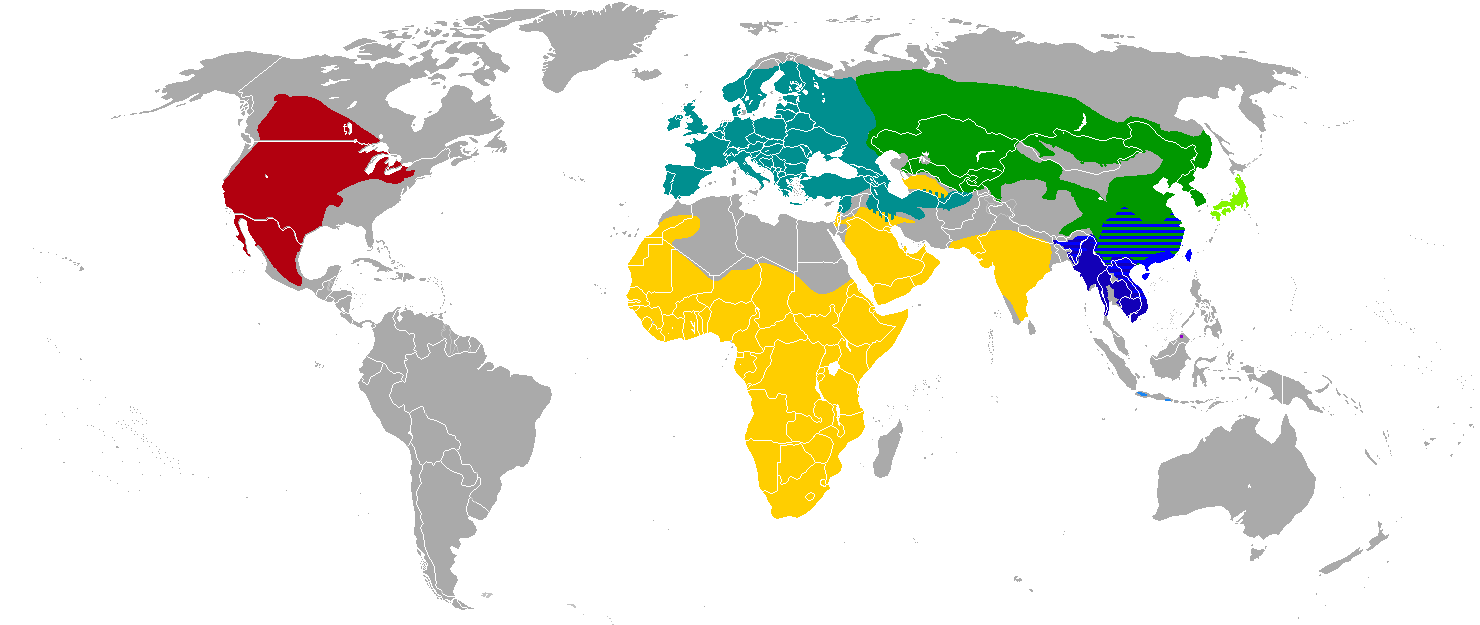
- Mustelid badger ranges Honey badger (Mellivora capensis) American badger (Taxidea taxus) European badger (Meles meles) Asian badger (Meles leucurus) Japanese badger (Meles anakuma) Chinese ferret-badger (Melogale moschata) Burmese ferret-badger (Melogale personata) Javan ferret-badger (Melogale orientalis) Bornean ferret-badger (Melogale everetti)

= Badger =

Short-legged omnivore

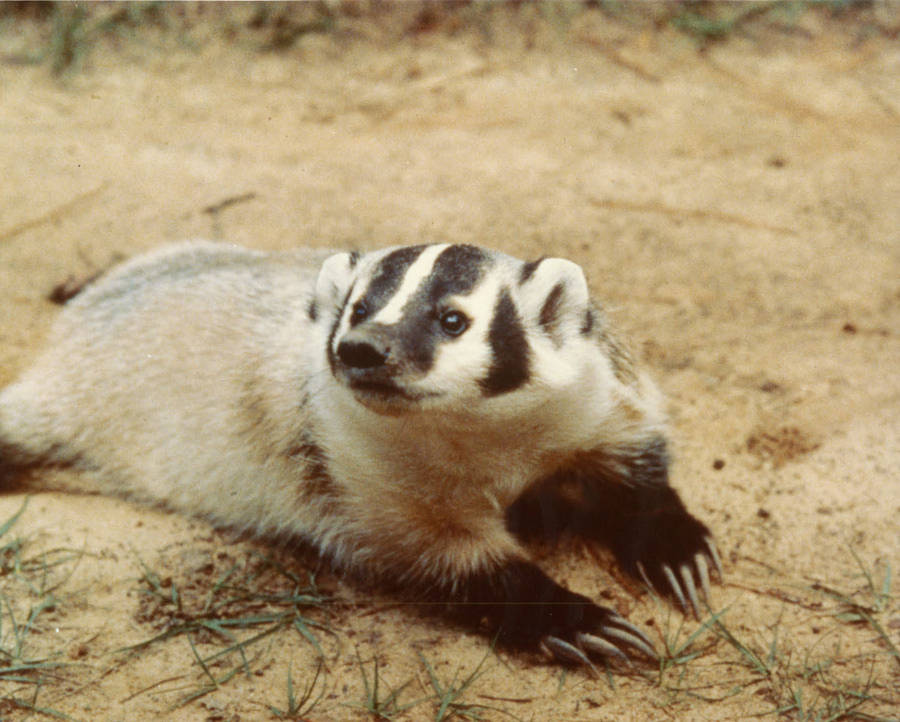
An American badger

Badgers are medium-sized short-legged omnivores in the superfamily Musteloidea. Badgers are a polyphyletic rather than a natural taxonomic grouping, being united by their squat bodies and adaptions for fossorial activity rather than by their ancestral relationships: Musteloidea contains several families, only two of which (the "weasel family" Mustelidae and the "skunk family" Mephitidae) include badgers; moreover, both of these families also include various other animals that are not badgers.

The fifteen species of mustelid badgers are grouped in four subfamilies: four species of Melinae (genera Meles and Arctonyx) including the European badger, five species of Helictidinae (genus Melogale) or ferret-badger, the honey badger or ratel Mellivorinae (genus Mellivora), and the American badger Taxideinae (genus Taxidea). Badgers include the most basal mustelids; the American badger is the most basal of all, followed successively by the ratel and the Melinae; the estimated split dates are about 17.8, 15.5 and 14.8 million years ago, respectively.

The two species of Asiatic stink badgers of the genus Mydaus were formerly included within Melinae (and thus Mustelidae), but more recent genetic evidence indicates these are actually members of the skunk family (Mephitidae).

Badger mandibular condyles connect to long cavities in their skulls, which gives resistance to jaw dislocation and increases their bite grip strength. This in turn limits jaw movement to hinging open and shut, or sliding from side to side, but it does not hamper the twisting movement possible for the jaws of most mammals.

Badgers have rather short, wide bodies, with short legs for digging. They have elongated, weasel-like heads with small ears. Their tails vary in length depending on species; the stink badger has a very short tail, while the ferret-badger's tail can be 46–51 cm (18–20 in) long, depending on age. They have black faces with distinctive white markings, grey bodies with a light-coloured stripe from head to tail, and dark legs with light-coloured underbellies. They grow to around 90 cm (35 in) in length, including tail.

The European badger is one of the largest; the American badger, the hog badger, and the honey badger are generally a little smaller and lighter. Stink badgers are smaller still, and ferret-badgers are the smallest of all. They weigh around 9–11 kg (20–24 lb), while some Eurasian badgers weigh around 18 kg (40 lb).

== Etymology ==
The word "badger" originally applied to the European badger (Meles meles), comes from earlier bageard (16th century), presumably referring to the white mark borne like a badge on its forehead. Similarly, a now archaic synonym was bauson 'badger' (1375), a variant of bausond 'striped, piebald', from Old French bausant, baucent 'id.'.

The less common name brock (Old English: brocc), (Scots: brock) is a Celtic loanword (cf. Gaelic broc and Welsh broch, from Proto-Celtic *brokkos) meaning "grey". The Proto-Germanic term was *þahsuz (cf. German Dachs, Dutch das, Norwegian svintoks; Early Modern English dasse), probably from the PIE root *tek'- "to construct," so the badger would have been named after its digging of setts (tunnels); the Germanic term *þahsuz became taxus or taxō, -ōnis in Latin glosses, replacing mēlēs ("marten" or "badger"), and from these words the common Romance terms for the animal evolved (Italian tasso, French taisson—blaireau is now more common—Catalan toixó, Spanish tejón, Portuguese texugo).

A male European badger is a boar, a female is a sow, and a young badger is a cub. However, in North America the young are usually called kits, while the terms male and female are generally used for adults. A collective name suggested for a group of colonial badgers is a cete, but badger colonies are more often called clans. A badger's home is called a sett.

== Classification ==
The following list shows where the various species with the common name of badger are placed in the Mustelidae and Mephitidae classifications. The list is polyphyletic and the species commonly called badgers do not form a valid clade.

- Family Mustelidae
  - Subfamily Melinae
    - Genus Arctonyx
      - Northern hog badger, Arctonyx albogularis
      - Greater hog badger, Arctonyx collaris
      - Sumatran hog badger, Arctonyx hoevenii
    - Genus Meles
      - Japanese badger, Meles anakuma
      - Asian badger, Meles leucurus
      - European badger, Meles meles
      - Caucasian badger, Meles canescens
  - Subfamily Helictidinae
    - Genus Melogale
      - Burmese ferret-badger, Melogale personata
      - Javan ferret-badger, Melogale orientalis
      - Chinese ferret-badger, Melogale moschata
      - Formosan ferret-badger, Melogale subaurantiaca
      - Bornean ferret-badger, Melogale everetti
      - Vietnam ferret-badger, Melogale cucphuongensis
  - Subfamily Mellivorinae
    - Honey badger, Mellivora capensis
  - Subfamily Taxidiinae:
    - †Chamitataxus avitus
    - †Pliotaxidea nevadensis
    - †Pliotaxidea garberi
    - American badger, Taxidea taxus
- Family Mephitidae
  - Subfamily Mydainae
    - Genus Mydaus
      - Indonesian or Sunda stink badger (teledu), Mydaus javanensis
      - Palawan stink badger, Mydaus marchei

== Distribution ==
Badgers are found in much of North America, Great Britain, Ireland and most of the rest of Europe as far north as southern Scandinavia. They live as far east as Japan, Korea and China. The Javan ferret-badger lives in Indonesia, and the Bornean ferret-badger lives in Malaysia. The honey badger is found in most of sub-Saharan Africa, the Arabian Desert, southern Levant, Turkmenistan, Pakistan and India.

A Japanese badger walking around, 2016

== Behaviour ==
The behaviour of badgers differs by family, but all shelter underground, living in burrows called setts, which may be very extensive. Some are solitary, moving from home to home, while others are known to form clans called cetes. Cete size is variable from two to 15.

Badgers can run or gallop at 25–30 km/h (16–19 mph) for short periods of time. Some species, notably the honey badger, can climb well. In March 2024, scientists released footage of a wild Asian badger climbing a tree to a height of 2.5 m in South Korea. Badgers are nocturnal.

In North America, coyotes sometimes eat badgers and vice versa, but the majority of their interactions seem to be mutual or neutral. American badgers and coyotes have been seen hunting together in a cooperative fashion.

== Diet ==
The diet of the Eurasian badger consists largely of earthworms (especially Lumbricus terrestris), insects, grubs, and the eggs and young of ground-nesting birds. They also eat small mammals, amphibians, reptiles and birds, as well as roots and fruit. They are occasional predators of domestic chickens, and are able to break into enclosures that a fox cannot. In southern Spain, badgers feed to a significant degree on rabbits.

American badgers are fossorial carnivores – i.e. they catch a significant proportion of their food underground, by digging. They can tunnel after ground-dwelling rodents at speed.

The honey badger of Africa consumes honey, porcupines, and even venomous snakes (such as the puff adder); they climb trees to gain access to honey from bees' nests.

Badgers have been known to become intoxicated with alcohol after eating rotting fruit.

== Relation with humans ==
=== Hunting ===
Hunting badgers for sport has been common in many countries. The Dachshund (German for "badger hound") dog breed was bred for this purpose. Badger-baiting was formerly a popular blood sport. Although badgers are normally quite docile, they fight fiercely when cornered. This led people to capture and box badgers and then wager on whether a dog could succeed in removing the badger from its refuge. In England, opposition from naturalists led to its ban under the Cruelty to Animals Act 1835 and the Protection of Badgers Act 1992 (c. 51) made it an offence to kill, injure, or take a badger or to interfere with a sett unless under license from a statutory authority. The Hunting Act 2004 further banned fox hunters from blocking setts during their chases.

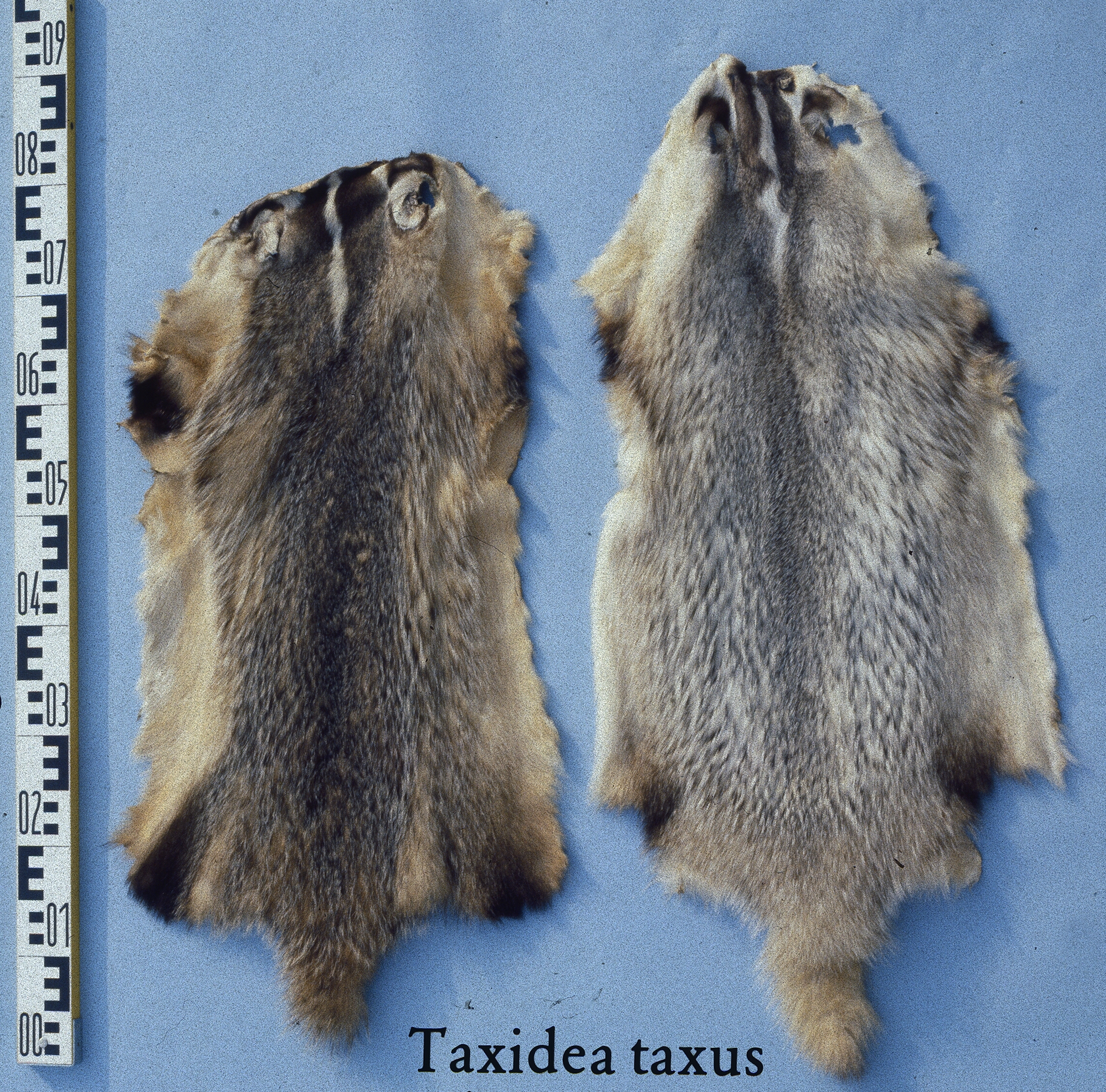
Badger pelts

Badgers have been trapped commercially for their pelts, which have been used for centuries to make shaving brushes, a purpose to which it is particularly suited owing to its high water retention. Virtually all commercially available badger hair now comes from mainland China, though, which has farms for the purpose. The Chinese supply three grades of hair to domestic and foreign brush makers. Village cooperatives are also licensed by the national government to hunt and process badgers to avoid their becoming a crop nuisance in rural northern China. The European badger is also used as trim for some traditional Scottish clothing. The American badger is also used for paintbrushes and as trim for some Native American garments.

=== Culling ===
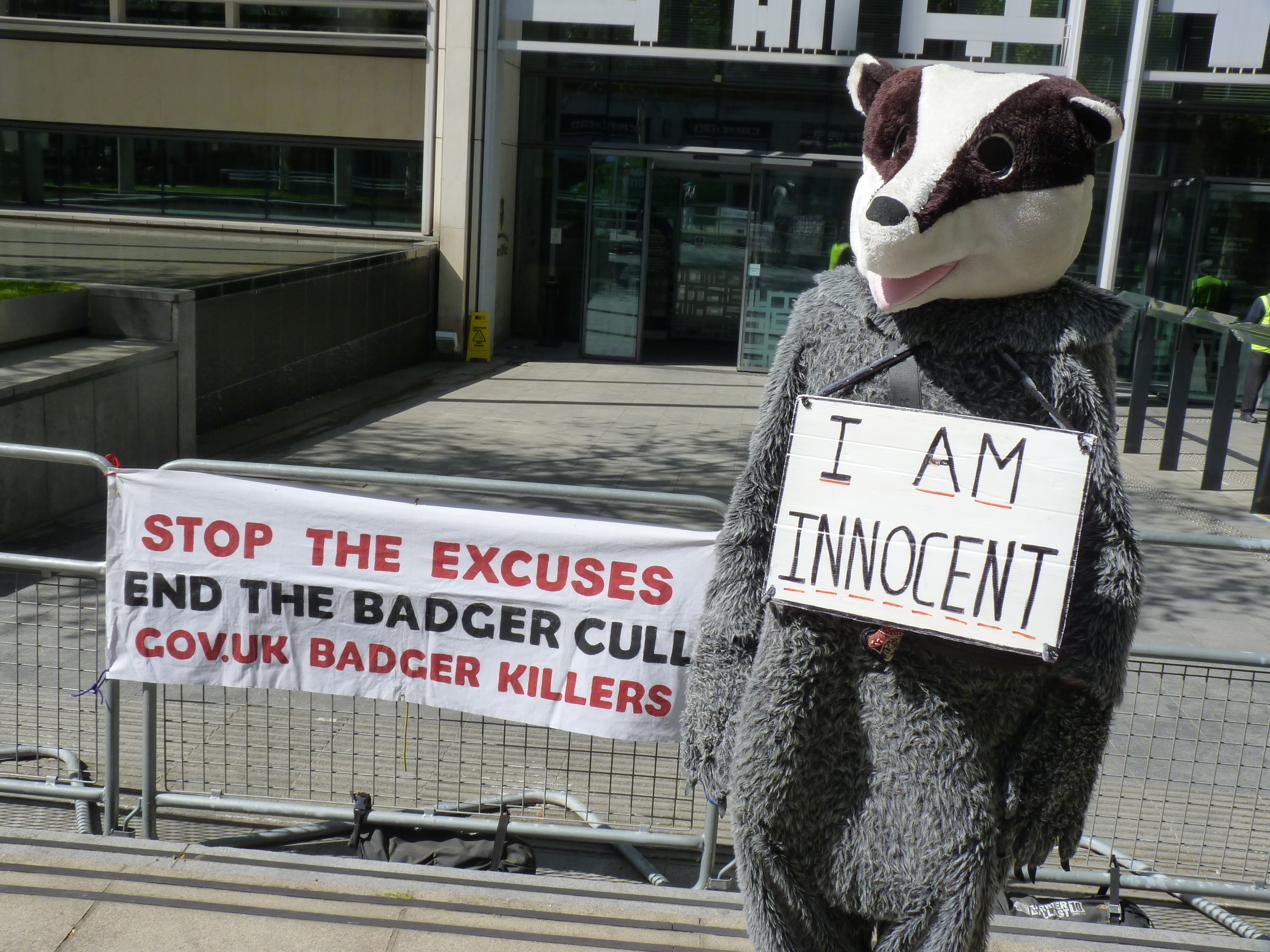
Badger protesting outside the Home Office.

Controlling the badger population is prohibited in many European countries since badgers are listed in the Berne Convention, but they are not otherwise the subject of any international treaty or legislation. Many badgers in Europe were gassed during the 1960s and 1970s to control rabies.

Until the 1980s, badger culling in the United Kingdom was undertaken in the form of gassing, allegedly to control the spread of bovine tuberculosis (bTB). Limited culling resumed in 1998 as part of a 10-year randomised trial cull, which was considered by John Krebs and others to show that culling was ineffective. Some groups called for a selective cull, whilst others favoured a programme of vaccination. As of 2013 Wales and Northern Ireland are currently conducting field trials of a badger vaccination programme. In 2012 the government authorised a limited cull led by the Department for Environment, Food and Rural Affairs. However it was later deferred and a wide range of reasons given. In August 2013 a full culling programme began, whereby it was expected that about 5,000 badgers would be killed over six weeks in West Somerset and Gloucestershire using a mixture of controlled shooting and free shooting (some badgers were to be trapped in cages first). The cull caused many protests, with emotional, economic and scientific reasons being cited. The badger is considered an iconic species of the British countryside and it has been claimed by shadow ministers that "The government's own figures show it will cost more than it saves...", and Lord Krebs, who led the Randomised Badger Culling Trial in the 1990s, said the two pilots "will not yield any useful information".

=== Badger gates ===
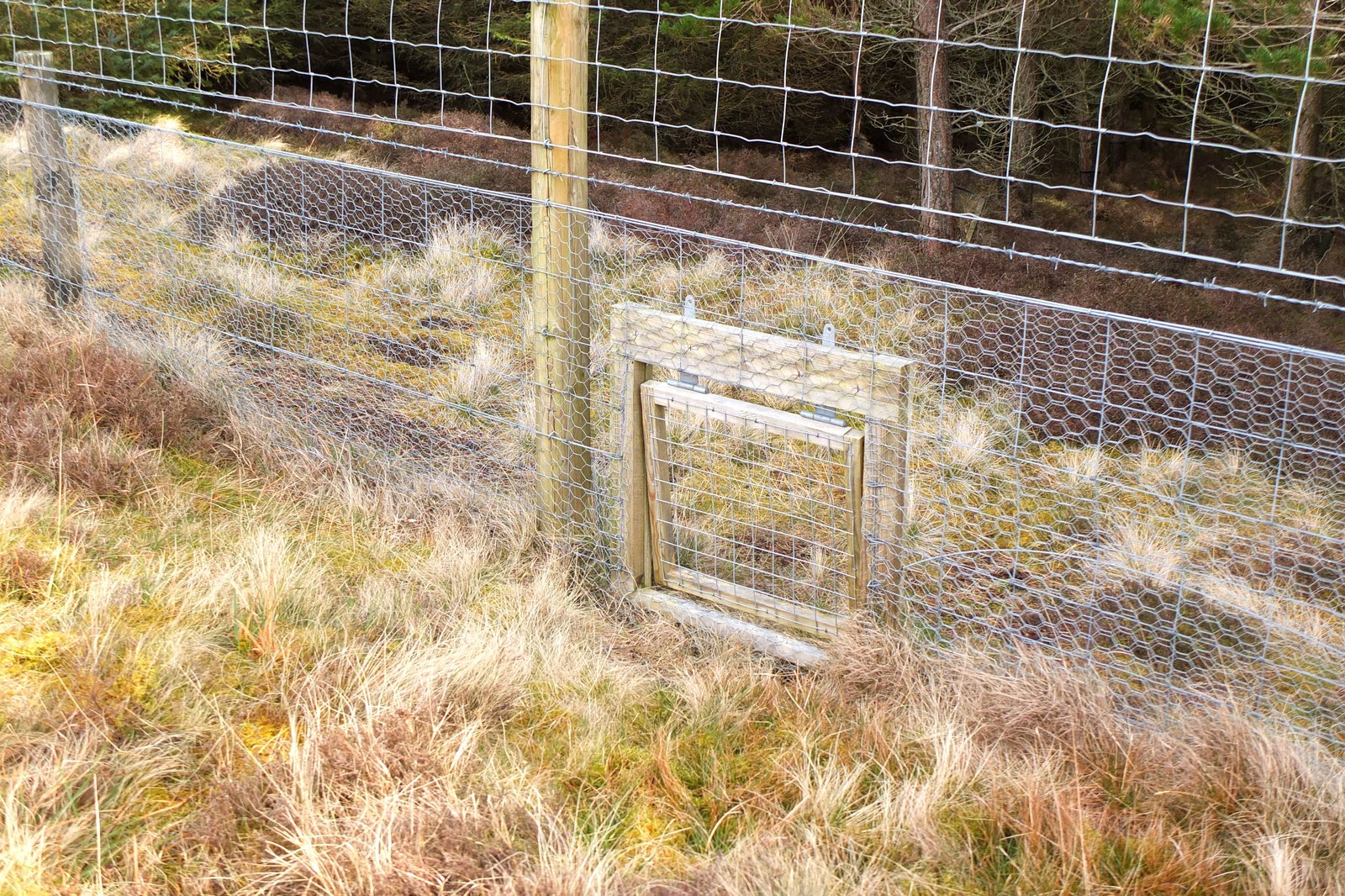
Badger gate

When protecting woodlands from deer and rabbit, installing fences in badger territory can be problematic. Because badgers are persistent and strong, if fences are placed across their "runs"—established foraging and travel paths—they may well dig through or under, damaging the fence and leaving openings that rabbits can get through. Ideally, badger runs should be identified before fence construction begins. The gateways are constructed in stages over time to ensure that badgers are using the manmade openings instead of damaging the new fence: starting with leaving a cut opening in the fence at ground level, later laying a floor (threshold), later still framing the opening, and eventually hanging a small free-swinging door that is heavy enough that rabbits don't seem to learn how to push them open. The recommended door size is 18 by 25 cm and weighs about 1.1 kg.

With a special license, badger fencing and one-way gates may be installed to exclude resident badgers from an area being developed.

=== Traditional medicine ===
Badgers have been used in traditional medicine in Europe, Asia and Africa.

=== Food ===
Although rarely eaten today in the United States or the United Kingdom, badgers were once a primary meat source for the diets of Native Americans and European colonists. Badgers were also eaten in Britain during World War II and the 1950s. In some areas of Russia, the consumption of badger meat is still widespread. Shish kebabs made from badger, along with dog meat and pork, are a major source of trichinosis outbreaks in the Altai Region of Russia. In Croatia badger meat is rarely eaten, but when it is, it is usually smoked, dried, or served in goulash. In France, badger meat was used in the preparation of several dishes, such as Blaireau au sang, and it was a relatively common ingredient in countryside cuisine. Badger meat was eaten in some parts of Spain until recently.

=== Pets ===
Badgers are sometimes kept as pets. Keeping a badger as a pet or offering one for sale is an offence in the United Kingdom under the 1992 Protection of Badgers Act.

== In popular culture ==
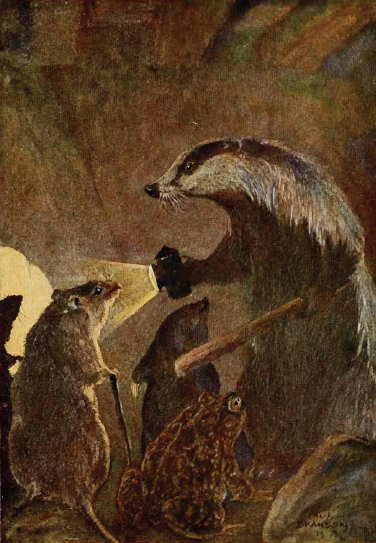
Badger, Ratty, Mole, and Mr. Toad from the 1913 edition of Kenneth Grahame's 1908 novel The Wind in the Willows

Medieval European bestiaries described badgers as working together to dig holes under mountains. They were said to lie down at the entrance of the hole holding a stick in their mouths, while other badgers piled dirt on their bellies. Two badgers would then take hold of the stick in the badger's mouth, and drag the animal loaded with dirt away, in the fashion of a wagon. The moralizing component of bestiaries often took precedence over their function as natural history texts, and this description of badgers was likely understood as an allegory.

In German-speaking areas of Europe, badgers were traditionally used to predict the length of winter. This became the North American tradition of Groundhog Day.

The 19th-century poem "The Badger" by John Clare describes a badger hunt and badger-baiting.

Many modern works of literature feature badger characters. Some of the most notable are Kenneth Grahame's children's novel The Wind in the Willows (1908), Beatrix Potter's The Tale of Mr. Tod (1912), T. H. White's The Once and Future King (1958, written 1938–41), Fantastic Mr. Fox (1970) by Roald Dahl, Richard Adams's Watership Down (1972), and Brian Jacques's Redwall series (1986–2011).

Badgers also feature in visual media. A Flash Video called Badgers went viral in the early years of YouTube. The 2013 PC video game Shelter has the player control a mother badger protecting her cubs.

The badger is the state animal of the U.S. state of Wisconsin, and Bucky Badger is the mascot of the University of Wisconsin–Madison. The badger also serves as the mascot of Brock University in Ontario, Canada; The University of Sussex and St Aidan's College, both in England; and of the Hufflepuff house of Hogwarts in the fictional Harry Potter franchise.
