= Sett =

Badger's den

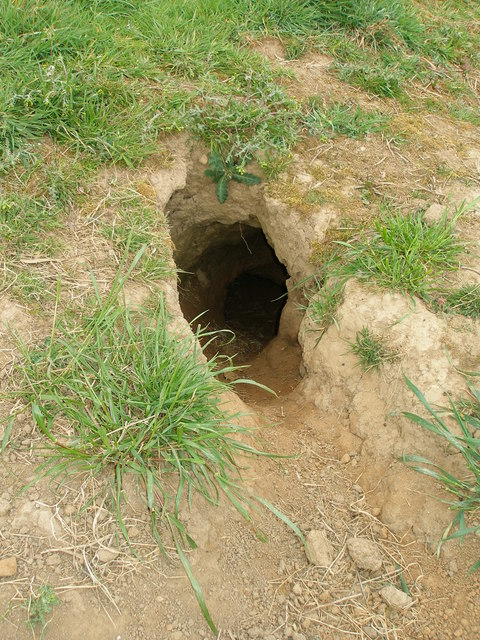
The entrance to a sett

A sett or set is a badger's den. It usually consists of a network of tunnels and numerous entrances. The largest setts are spacious enough to accommodate 15 or more animals with up to 300 metres (1,000 ft) of tunnels and as many as 40 openings. Such elaborate setts with extensive tunneling take many years for badgers to complete. One sett in Southern England spreads over an estimated area in excess of 2,000 square metres – precise measurement has not been attempted. Another sett, in north-eastern Germany, has been shown to have been in use for over ten thousand years. Setts are typically excavated in soil that is well drained and easy to dig, such as sand, and situated on sloping ground where there is some cover.

Sett tunnels are usually between 0.5 and 2 metres (1 1/2 and 6 1/2 ft) beneath the ground, and they incorporate larger chambers used for sleeping or rearing young. These chambers are lined with dry bedding material such as grass, straw, dead leaves or bracken. Tunnels are wider than they are high, typically around 30 centimetres (12 in) wide by 25 centimetres (10 in) high, which matches a badger's wide and stocky build.

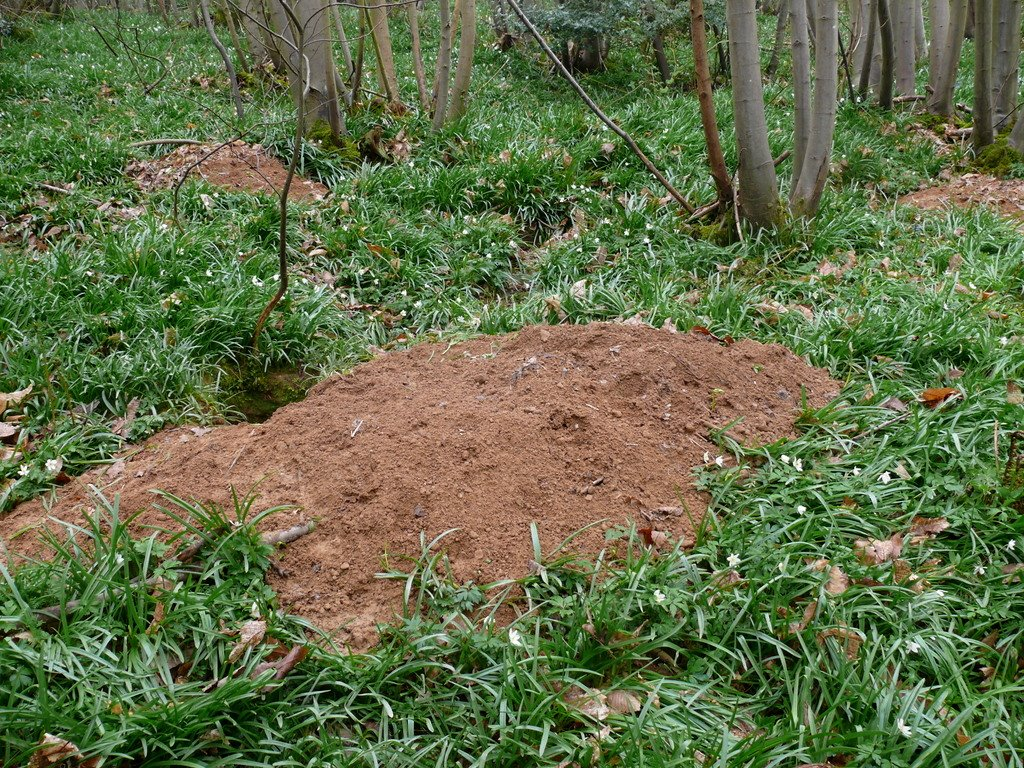
A "spoil heap" outside a badger sett

The material excavated by the badgers forms large heaps on the slope below the sett. Among this material may be found old bedding material, stones with characteristic heavy scratch-marks, and sometimes even the bones of long-dead badgers cleared out by later generations. Most setts have several active entrances, several more that are used rarely, and some that have fallen into disuse.

Setts are not always excavated entirely in soil. Sometimes they are under the shelter of a shed, or in a pile of timber or rocks. Badgers also excavate them under man-made structures like building foundations, concrete sidewalks, and paved roadways. This can lead to subsidence, and other damage to such structures.

Badger colonies often use several setts: a large main sett in the center of a colony's territory and occupied by most of a colony's members, and one or more smaller outlier setts. Outlier setts may have only two or three entrances and may be used by a small number of colony members when nearby food sources are in season or in autumn when the main sett is crowded with the year's young.

Badgers typically retreat to their setts at daybreak and come out at dusk. In cold regions, setts are dug below the level at which the ground freezes, and all members of the clan sleep in the same chamber, possibly to share body heat.

Sometimes setts or parts of setts that are not being used by badgers are occupied by rabbits or foxes.

== Legal protections ==
In the United Kingdom, badger setts are protected from disturbance or destruction under the Protection of Badgers Act 1992.
