= Bornean ferret badger =

Conservation status
- Endangered (IUCN 3.1)

Scientific classification
- Kingdom: Animalia
- Phylum: Chordata
- Class: Mammalia
- Order: Carnivora
- Family: Mustelidae
- Genus: Melogale
- Species: M. everetti

Binomial name
- Melogale everetti (Thomas, 1895)
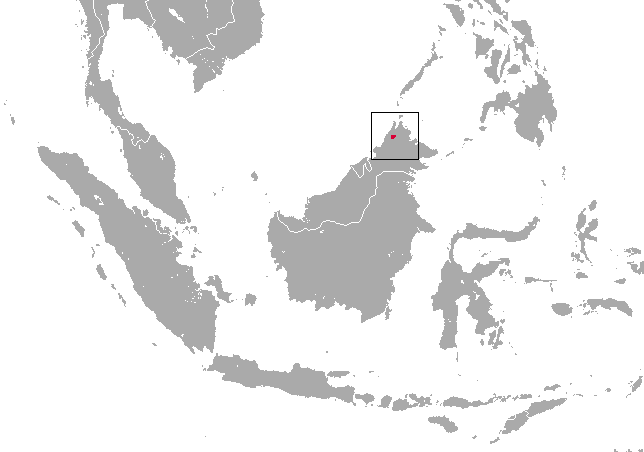
- Bornean ferret badger range

Species of carnivore

The Bornean ferret badger (Melogale everetti), also known as Everett's ferret badger or the Kinabalu ferret badger, is a small, nocturnal and omnivorous mammal that is endemic to the island of Borneo. It is a member of the Mustelidae and one of six species of the genus Melogale. It is listed as endangered on the IUCN Red List due to its small distribution range, which includes Kinabalu National Park and Crocker Range National Park.

Bornean ferret badgers weigh up to 3 kg (6.6 lb) and reach a maximum recorded body length of 44 cm (17 in). They forage on the ground for invertebrates, amphibians, insects, fruit and carrion.

The overall population trend of the Bornean ferret badger is "assumed to be in at least shallow decrease".

== Taxonomy ==
Melogale everetti was the scientific name first used by the British zoologist Oldfield Thomas in 1895 to describe the Bornean ferret badger. The scientific name commemorates Alfred Hart Everett.

The Bornean ferret badger has historically been considered by some to be a subspecies of the Javan ferret-badger (Melogale orientalis) and by others as a subspecies of the Burmese ferret-badger (Melogale personata). However, it is now considered to be a distinct Melogale species.

== Description ==
The Bornean ferret badger is covered by fur that ranges in colour from grey brown to dark black, with its underside covered by a lighter coloured fur. The most recognisable and defining characteristic of this species of ferret badger is the "ferret-like mask" pattern of colouration on its face, that is either white or yellow. This species is also distinguishable from other ferret badgers by a dorsal stripe that runs from the top of its head to the bottom of its shoulders, which ranges in colour from white to red.

The Bornean ferret badger is characteristic of ferret badgers, as it has short legs and broad feet. Its feet are equipped with strong digging claws, as well as with ridges that run along the pads of the feet and partial webbing between the toes that are believed to be climbing adaptations.

=== Size ===
The Bornean ferret badger is small and long compared to the other members of the Melogale genus. In general, it can weigh as little as 1 kg (2.2 lb) and as much as 3 kg (6.6 lb). The body of the Bornean ferret badger is between 33 and 44 cm (13 and 17 in) in length, with a long, bushy tail that can be between 15.2 and 23 cm (6.0 and 9.1 in) in length.

== Distribution and habitat ==
The Bornean ferret badger is endemic to the island of Borneo and has a very restricted distribution range on the island. Its distribution range is limited to the northern tip of the island of Borneo, specifically Kinabalu National Park, Crocker Range National Park and the surrounding area. This includes the adjacent districts of Penampang, Tambunan and Tuaran in Sabah. A limited number of survey efforts have been conducted in montane forests in north-east Kalimantan, Sarawak and southern Sabah, but there is currently no evidence that the Bornean ferret badger inhabits these regions.

The IUCN Red List of Threatened Species lists the Bornean ferret badger as endangered, due to its relatively small estimated extent of occurrence of approximately 4,200 km^{2} (1,600 sq mi). This small extent of occurrence is fragmented by roads that run through Kinabalu National Park and Crocker Range National Park, such as the main east-west Sabah highway. Resulting in the area of occupancy of the Bornean ferret badger totalling only 1,100 km^{2} (420 sq mi), considerably smaller than its extent of occurrence.

The habitat of the Bornean ferret badger is predominantly evergreen and montane forests. Although, they have also been observed in surrounding scrubland and slash and burn agriculture fields. They inhabit upland and highland areas, with all reliable recorded sightings occurring between 500 m (1,600 ft) and 3,000 m (9,800 ft) of elevation.

=== Population ===
Very little is known about the size of the Bornean ferret badger's population. The only known large scale collection of specimens occurred in the late 1960s to early 1970s, when 57 specimens were collected and are now displayed in the Sabah Museum. Most recorded sightings of the Bornean ferret badger have been of individuals, making population estimates impossible. Two camera-trapping studies have been conducted within the geographic and altitudinal range of the Bornean ferret badger, to determine the relative size of the population compared to other animal species in the area. The first camera-trap survey in Crocker Range National Park detected the Bornean ferret badger at a much lower rate than other similar-sized carnivores in the area. This suggests that even within its core distribution range, it is rare and potentially occurs at low densities. However, a separate survey in 2016 concluded the direct opposite, namely that the Bornean ferret badger "may be among the most numerous small carnivore species" in the area. However, camera-trap encounter rates cannot determine the true abundance nor the population size of animals on the ground.

The status of the Bornean ferret badger's population is also relatively unknown. There is no direct information on population trend, but it is "assumed to be in at least shallow decrease." This assumption is based on the extent of habitat conversion and encroachment experienced by the Bornean ferret badger, and the potential inability of it to "thrive in isolated slash and burn agriculture fields not surrounded by old-growth forests."

== Behaviour and biology ==
The Bornean ferret badger is "believed to be nocturnal and ground-dwelling". However, they are also known to be formidable climbers and have been observed foraging in trees. While little is known about the Bornean ferret badger's specific diet, it is an omnivore that forages on the ground for invertebrates, amphibians, insects, fruit, and carrion. It has also been observed that they eat earthworms.

The Bornean ferret badger, due to its nocturnal nature, is mainly active at night and at dusk. It spends most of its time at night foraging for food and when it is not foraging the Bornean ferret badger lives in a burrow. Despite its strong digging ability, the Bornean ferret badger does not dig its own burrow. Instead, it lives in pre-existing burrows dug by other animals.

The Bornean ferret badger is known to exhibit fierce behaviour when it is provoked or cornered. It exhibits the warning colouration of its masked face and dorsal stripe to scare potential predators. It has also been known to emit a pungent odour from its scent glands.

The breeding season of the Bornean ferret badger is relatively long and occurs annually, as females are able to reproduce at all times throughout the year. Male ferret badgers undergo a period of non-reproduction every year from September to December, during which they cease sperm production. The gestation period of female ferret badgers is between 57 and 80 days, with young normally being born in May and June. Female Bornean ferret badgers give birth to litters of between 1 and 5 offspring. The offspring are weaned and cared for by their mother for between 2 and 3 months in a burrow, until they are able to forage for themselves.

== Threats ==
=== Natural threats ===
The major natural threats to the Bornean ferret badger are all linked to the very small extent of occurrence of its population (4,200 km^{2}) and its concentration in a single forest environment. This makes it vulnerable to large scale, unpredictable events such as epidemics or natural disasters. A potential epidemic within the species is a serious threat to its population, as it is concentrated in one area with limited separation between population groups. Similarly, the island of Borneo experiences an extreme monsoon season and occasionally typhoons, that could potentially eliminate the ferret badger population.

=== Anthropogenic (man-made) threats ===
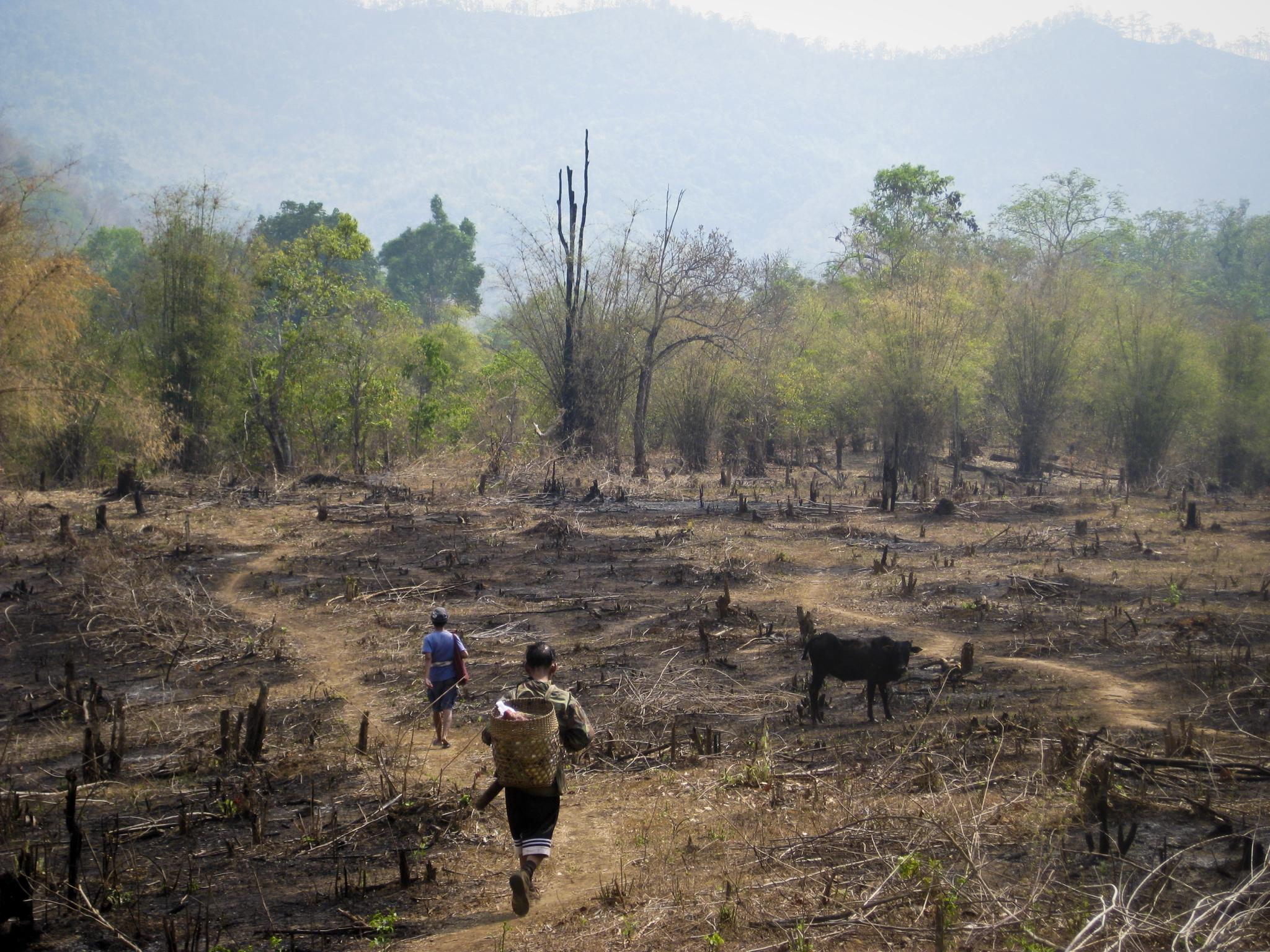
Slash-and-burn agriculture

Climate change is also likely to negatively impact the Bornean ferret badger population. Climate change increases the likelihood of extreme and unpredictable natural events such as typhoons that threatened the ferret badger. It will also have negative impacts on the Bornean ferret badger population, as higher temperatures from the effects of climate change result in upslope range shifts. Species such as the Bornean ferret badger that already live at high altitudes are unable to move to higher altitudes as temperatures rise, which could result in extinction.

Human encroachment on the Bornean ferret badger's habitat resulting in habitat degradation, is another threat to the ferret badger population. Kinabalu National Park and Crocker Range National Park are well-protected from human activities; however, surrounding habitat has been converted into slash and burn agriculture by local communities. Incidents such as illegal land clearing near Kinabalu National Park in 2011 place increased pressure on the already endangered Bornean ferret badger population. The negative impacts of human activity is reflected in declining incident records (such as road kills), which suggest the Bornean ferret badger's population is already being harmed by the increasing human encroachment on its habitat.

== Conservation ==
The habitat and distribution range of the Bornean ferret badger is protected by several conservation agreements. The Bornean ferret badger is currently listed on the Sabah Wildlife Conservation Enactment 1997, as Melogale personata instead of Melogale everetti. This piece of regional legislation covers the state of Sabah in Malaysian Borneo and aims to protect the endangered species in the region. The Sabah Wildlife Conservation Enactment 1997 focuses mainly on the threat of international trade, but at present this is not believed to be a conservation priority for the Bornean ferret badger. However, the listing of the Bornean ferret badger in the legislation under an obsolete name could complicate enforcement of its protected status.

=== Kinabalu National Park ===
There is no conservation plan specifically for the Bornean ferret badger in Kinabalu National Park; however, it benefits from the park's UNESCO World Heritage status. Under the World Heritage Convention (1975), Malaysia has committed to "do all they can with their own resources to protect their World Heritage properties". Legislation protecting Kinabalu National Park was established under the Parks Enactment of 1984 and Amendment of 2007. This resulted in Kinabalu National Park becoming a protected area, which is beneficial to the conservation efforts of the Bornean ferret badger. Kinabalu National Park is described as an "island in a sea of agriculture and developments". Given slash and burn agriculture and human encroachment are major threats to the Bornean ferret badger's population and distribution range, the protected status of Kinabalu National Park is significant to conservation efforts.

=== Crocker Range National Park ===
Crocker Range National Park falls within the distribution range of the Bornean ferret badger and plays an important role in its conservation. The park's "national park" status provides protection to the flora and fauna within it, including the Bornean ferret badger. This has and continues to limit the impacts of human encroachment on the Bornean ferret badger's habitat. This is significant to the conservation efforts of the Bornean ferret badger, as Crocker Range National Park is surrounded by numerous settlements of the Kadazan-Dusun and Murut people, which have moderately fast-growing populations that practice slash and burn agriculture.

=== Conservation priorities ===
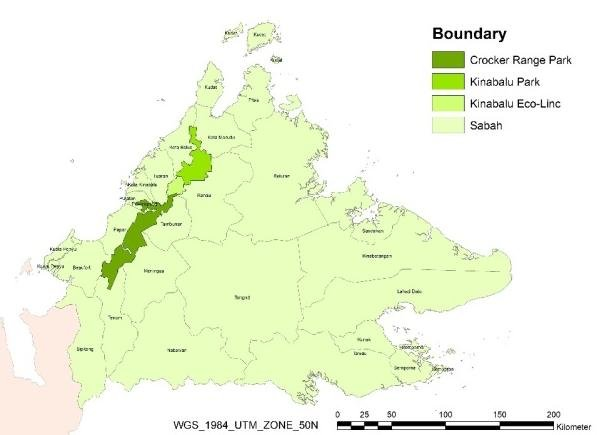
Kinabalu Ecolinc Project map

The Bornean ferret badger is thought to only inhabit Kinabalu National Park and Crocker Range National Park, meaning all conservation efforts should be focused in this region according to the IUCN.

Currently, the most significant conservation project that will benefit the Bornean ferret badger population is the Kinabalu Ecolinc Project. This project will restore the ecological linkage between the two fully protected areas of Kinabalu National Park and Crocker Range National Park. These are the sites of the only two known Bornean ferret badger populations and an ecological link between the populations would improve the conservation status of the species. "However, it is unknown if such a linkage is feasible, or if the land between the two national parks is too fragmented and degraded to be used habitually by the species."

Another conservation priority for the Bornean ferret badger is the establishment of a formal buffer zone with clearly specified land-use restrictions around Kinabalu National Park. This would reduce the impacts of human encroachment on the Bornean ferret badger's habitat, which has experienced significant losses of forest cover in the area surrounding Kinabalu National Park.
