= Vietnam ferret-badger =

Conservation status
- Data Deficient (IUCN 3.1)

Scientific classification
- Kingdom: Animalia
- Phylum: Chordata
- Class: Mammalia
- Infraclass: Placentalia
- Order: Carnivora
- Family: Mustelidae
- Genus: Melogale
- Species: M. cucphuongensis

Binomial name
- Melogale cucphuongensis T. Nadler, 2011
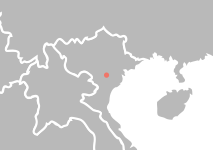
- Melogale cucphuongensis distribution

Species of carnivore

The Vietnam ferret-badger (Melogale cucphuongensis) is a member of the family Mustelidae native to Vietnam. It was described in 2011 and is known from only two specimens.

== Taxonomy ==
The Vietnam ferret-badger is a member of the genus Melogale, which contains another five species. Two of these, the Burmese ferret-badger and the Chinese ferret-badger, occur together with it in the same region. The Vietnam ferret-badger was assigned to a separate species by comparing the holotype to a limited number of specimens of these two species. As this does not take into account many other Melogale specimens held worldwide, it is as of 2016 unclear whether the name given to the species is valid with regard to earlier synonyms. Pending verification, the name M. cucphuongensis has been provisionally accepted by the IUCN in its assessment.

== Discovery ==
In March 2005, a living ferret-badger that looked different from all known ferret-badger species was confiscated by rangers from Cúc Phương National Park in Vietnam. This animal died and the carcass was disposed of. A year later, in January 2006, a freshly dead individual of the same phenotype was found at the Endangered Primate Rescue Center (EPRC) in Cúc Phương National Park. Due to several markedly different characteristics (namely its dark brown head and body, its black and white stripe running from its neck to its shoulders, and the shape of its skull), these specimens were assigned to a new species.

== Distribution and habitat ==
The only two specimens known come from a site that consists of a compound of buildings in a degraded lowland evergreen forest fringe (second specimen) and from a location near it (first specimen), in the Cúc Phương National Park in Northern Vietnam, in the Ninh Bình Province. It is not known whether this site is representative of the species' habitat. The site is situated on limestone, which has given rise to the speculation that the species might depend on a karst habitat, as do other animals in the region.

== Conservation ==
The Vietnam ferret-badger is currently classified as Data Deficient by the IUCN, and no specific threat estimate is deemed possible. The species is probably under hunting pressure, as the site is heavily hunted and one of the specimens had apparently escaped from a snare (although the presence of the ferret-badgers indicates that they may not be heavily impacted by this). Habitat loss due to deforestation is a general threat to ecosystems in the region, which likely applies to this species as well.
