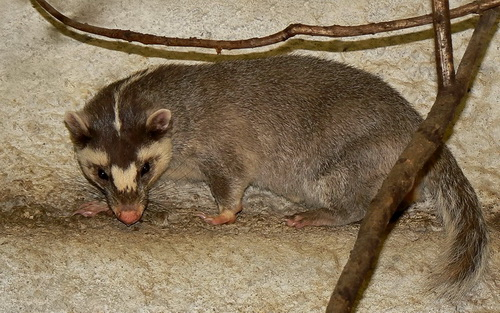
- Chinese ferret-badger (Melogale moschata) at Prague Zoo

Scientific classification
- Kingdom: Animalia
- Phylum: Chordata
- Class: Mammalia
- Order: Carnivora
- Family: Mustelidae
- Subfamily: Helictidinae; J.E. Gray, 1865
- Genus: Melogale; I. Saint-Hilaire, 1831

Type species
- Melogale personata

Species
- Melogale everetti; Melogale moschata; Melogale subaurantiaca; Melogale orientalis; Melogale personata; Melogale cucphuongensis
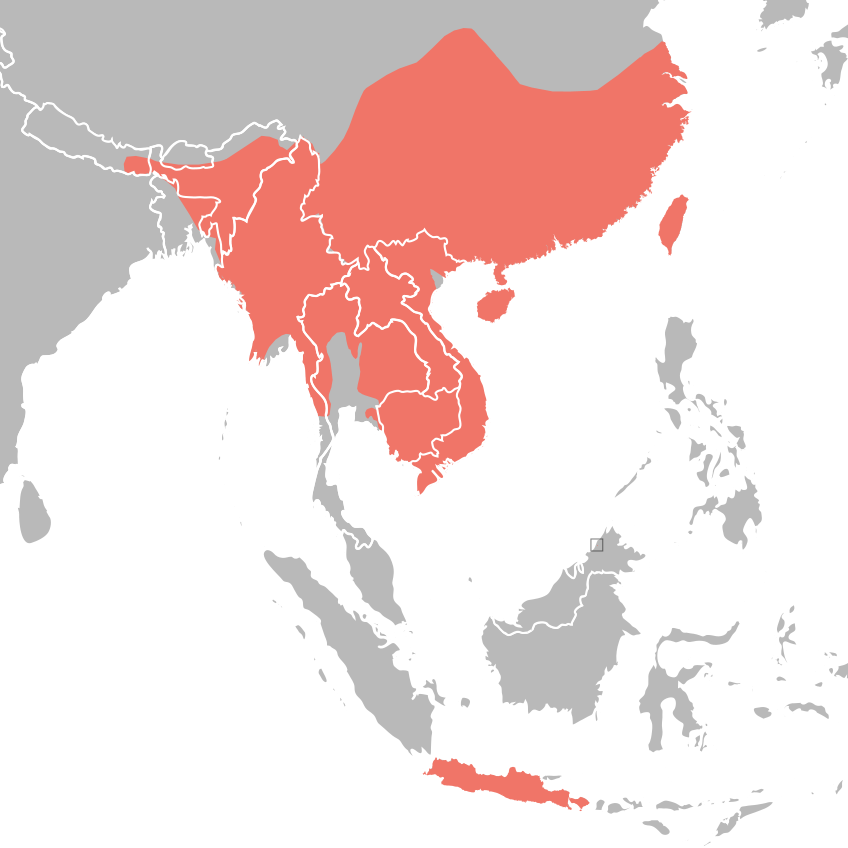
- Melogale distribution

= Ferret-badger =

Genus of carnivores

Ferret-badgers are the six species of the genus Melogale, which is the only genus of the monotypic mustelid subfamily Helictidinae.

- Bornean ferret-badger (Melogale everetti)
- Chinese ferret-badger (Melogale moschata)
- Formosan ferret-badger (Melogale subaurantiaca)
- Javan ferret-badger (Melogale orientalis)
- Burmese ferret-badger (Melogale personata)
- Vietnam ferret-badger (Melogale cucphuongensis)

== Description and etymology ==
The genus was described in 1931 by Isidore Geoffroy Saint-Hilaire (as Mélogale) with Melogale personata as its sole member. Sainte-Hilaire chose the genus name, which he translated to "belette blaireau" ("badger weasel") after the animal's resemblance to those other mustelids. He described M. personata as having a weasel-like shape but likened its head, claws, hair, and coloration to those of a badger (genus Meles). Sainte-Hilaire described M. personata as belonging to a distinct genus on the basis of its long, cone-shaped head.

== Human impact ==
The ferret-badger's impact on humans is through the spread of rabies. This has been documented in Taiwan and China but lack of prior documentation and research on ferret-badgers has proven a roadblock.

Genus Melogale – I. Saint-Hilaire, 1831 – five species
Common name	Scientific name and subspecies	Range	Size and ecology	IUCN status and estimated population
Bornean ferret-badger	M. everetti (Thomas, 1895)	Small parts of Borneo	Size: 33–44 cm (13–17 in) long, plus 15–23 cm (6–9 in) tail Habitat: Forest and shrubland Diet: Primarily eats invertebrates, amphibians, insects, fruit, and carrion	EN Unknown
Burmese ferret-badger	M. personata I. Saint-Hilaire, 1831 Five subspecies: M. p. laotum; M. p. nipalensis; M. p. personata; M. p. pierrei; M. p. tonquinia	Southeast Asia	Size: 33–44 cm (13–17 in) long, plus 15–23 cm (6–9 in) tail Habitat: Grassland, shrubland, and forest Diet: Primarily eats insects and snails, as well as small mammals, frogs, lizards, carrion, birds, eggs, and fruit	LC Unknown
Chinese ferret-badger	M. moschata (Gray, 1831) Seven subspecies: M. m. ferreogrisea; M. m. hainanensis; M. m. millsi; M. m. moschata; M. m. sorella; M. m. subaurantiaca; M. m. taxilla	East Asia	Size: 30–43 cm (12–17 in) long, plus 15–21 cm (6–8 in) tail Habitat: Forest, shrubland, and grassland Diet: Primarily eats insects, frogs, and carrion	LC Unknown
Javan ferret-badger	M. orientalis (Blanford, 1888) Two subspecies: M. o. orientalis; M. o. sundaicus	Parts of Java and Bali	Size: 35–40 cm (14–16 in) long, plus 14–17 cm (6–7 in) tail Habitat: Shrubland and forest Diet: Primarily eats invertebrates and insects	LC Unknown
Vietnam ferret-badger	M. cucphuongensis T. Nadler, 2011	Vietnam	Size: Unknown Habitat: Forest Diet: Unknown	DD Unknown
