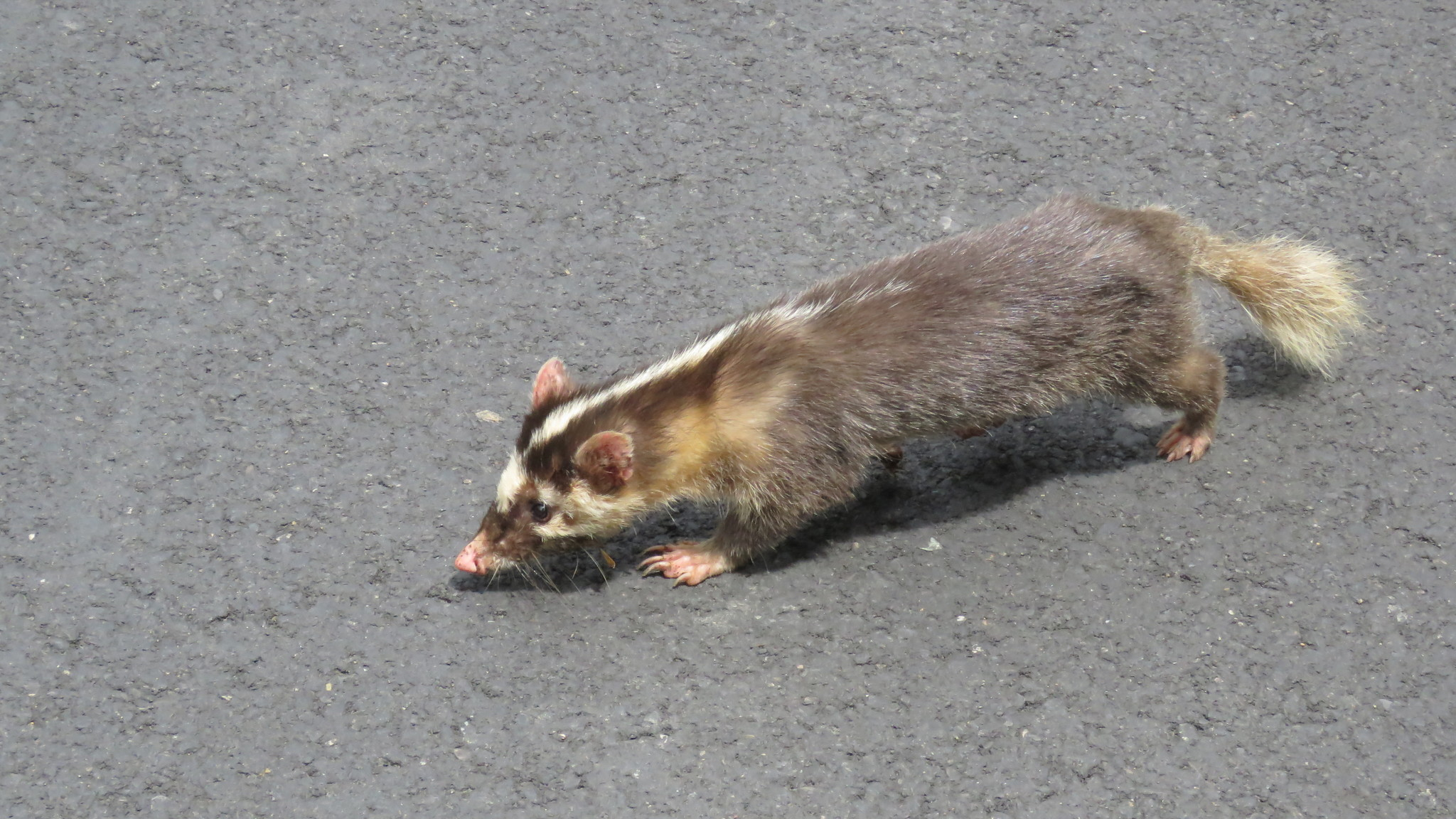

Scientific classification
- Kingdom: Animalia
- Phylum: Chordata
- Class: Mammalia
- Infraclass: Placentalia
- Order: Carnivora
- Family: Mustelidae
- Genus: Melogale
- Species: M. subaurantiaca

Binomial name
- Melogale subaurantiaca (Swinhoe, 1862)

= Formosan ferret-badger =

Species of mammal

The Formosan ferret-badger (Melogale subaurantiaca) is a mustelid species endemic to Taiwan.

== Taxonomy ==
It was formerly thought to be conspecific with the Chinese ferret-badger (M. moschata), but a 2019 genetic study found it to represent a distinct species, and the American Society of Mammalogists later reclassified it as a distinct species. However, many authorities like the IUCN Red List still consider it conspecific with M. moschata.

== Distribution ==
The species is endemic to the mainland island of Taiwan.

== Reproduction ==
Male Formosan ferret-badgers produce sperm between the months of February and September, and mate with females between March and October. The species is thought to have a litter size of two, and breeds once a year.

== Threats ==
A 2015 study analyzing specimens of M. subaurantiaca collected between 2010 and 2013 found evidence of rabies in just under half of the sampled individuals, indicating that a rabies epidemic hit the species at some point prior to the study. This was the first time rabies had been detected on Taiwan since it was declared rabies-free in 1961. The species is now thought to be a reservoir species for the rabies virus on Taiwan, and as of 2019, it has become an epidemic in eastern Taiwan; however, epidemics in western and southern Taiwan had subsided by then. Aside from the threats posed to the species, there have been reports of spillover from the ferret-badgers to pets and humans. Vaccination will be necessary to serve as a barrier to the disease and prevent further spillover.

== See also ==
- List of endemic species of Taiwan
