= Javan ferret-badger =

Conservation status
- Least Concern (IUCN 3.1)

Scientific classification
- Kingdom: Animalia
- Phylum: Chordata
- Class: Mammalia
- Order: Carnivora
- Family: Mustelidae
- Genus: Melogale
- Species: M. orientalis

Binomial name
- Melogale orientalis Blanford, 1888
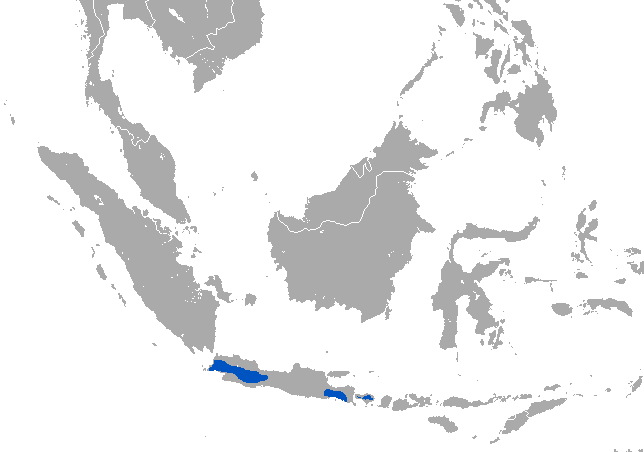
- Javan ferret-badger range

Synonyms
- Melogale personata ssp. orientalis Blanford, 1888

Species of carnivore

The Javan ferret-badger (Melogale orientalis) is a mustelid endemic to Java and Bali, Indonesia. It is listed as Least Concern on the IUCN Red List and occurs from at least 260 to 2,230 m (850 to 7,320 ft) elevation in or close to forested areas.

== Description ==
An adult Javan ferret-badger weighs between 1 and 2 kg (2.2 and 4.4 lb) with a body length of 35 to 40 cm (14 to 16 in) and a tail of 14.5 to 17 cm (6 to 7 in). The head is small with a narrow, blunt snout, long whiskers and large eyes. The body is low-slung with brown silky fur tinged with red and in some lights looks tawny or greyish. The back of the head and throat are darker brown and there are white markings on the face, neck, throat, chest and abdomen.

== Distribution and habitat ==
The Javan ferret-badger is endemic to the islands of Java and Bali in Indonesia. Its exact range is unknown, but it is present in hilly and mountainous areas and may also occur at lower altitudes. In western Java, it has been observed in Mount Halimun Salak National Park and in Gunung Gede Pangrango National Park. In Bali, it has been recorded primary forest on a forest track at an elevation of 1,180 m (3,870 ft) and in an area of secondary forest and rubber plantations not far from human habitations. Javan ferret badgers have been recorded in the wild in just 30 localities in the Province of Banten, West Java, Central Java, Yogyakarta, East Java and on Bali.

== Behaviour and ecology ==
Observations in Gunung Gede Pangrango National Park indicate that the Javan ferret-badger is mainly nocturnal. Small groups of adults and juveniles have been observed scavenging together for food scraps at picnic areas and turning over the leaf litter of the forest floor; they seemed undisturbed by the presence of humans, and one young individual even fed on biscuits held out on an observer's hand.

Data of litters offered for sale on online platforms suggests a peak in breeding from December to March.

== Threats and conservation ==
Much of Java's primary forest has been fragmented and degraded. However, the Javan ferret-badger is thought to be at least partially adaptable to habitat changes, as it has been recorded in secondary forests and plantations. Over a ten-year period from 2011 to 2020, Javan ferret badgers were observed offered for sale in eleven wildlife markets on Java and Bali, and on several online platforms.
