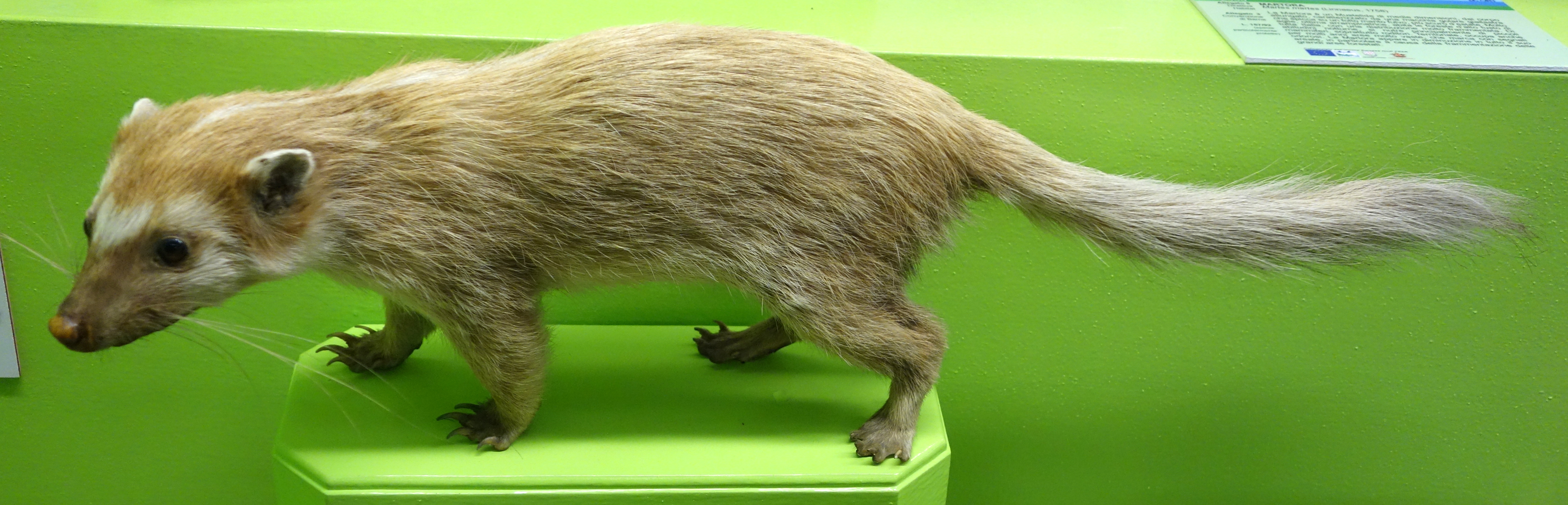
- Mounted specimen at the Natural History Museum of Genoa

Conservation status
- Least Concern (IUCN 3.1)

Scientific classification
- Kingdom: Animalia
- Phylum: Chordata
- Class: Mammalia
- Order: Carnivora
- Family: Mustelidae
- Genus: Melogale
- Species: M. personata

Binomial name
- Melogale personata I. Geoffroy Saint-Hilaire, 1831
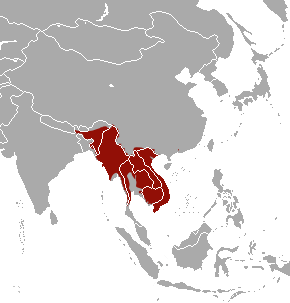
- Burmese ferret-badger range

= Burmese ferret-badger =

Species of carnivore

The Burmese ferret-badger (Melogale personata), also known as the large-toothed ferret-badger, is a mustelid native to Southeast Asia.

Little is known about the Burmese ferret-badger. Many of the published descriptions are of deceased individuals or records by camera traps.

== Description ==
The Burmese ferret-badger has a head and body length of 35–40 cm (14–16 in), a tail length of 15–21 cm (5.9–8.3 in) and a body weight of 1.5–3 kg (3.3–6.6 lb). The fur ranges from fawn brown to dark brown, with a white dorsal stripe. The face is marked with black and white patches, which are unique to each individual. The rear part of the tail is whitish.

The Burmese ferret-badger is very similar in appearance to the Chinese ferret-badger (Melogale moschata) and can only be reliably distinguished by dentition, specifically the larger size up the upper fourth premolar. While some sources have suggested that the two species can be distinguished by dorsal and facial markings, this does not appear to be reliable in all populations.

== Distribution and habitat ==
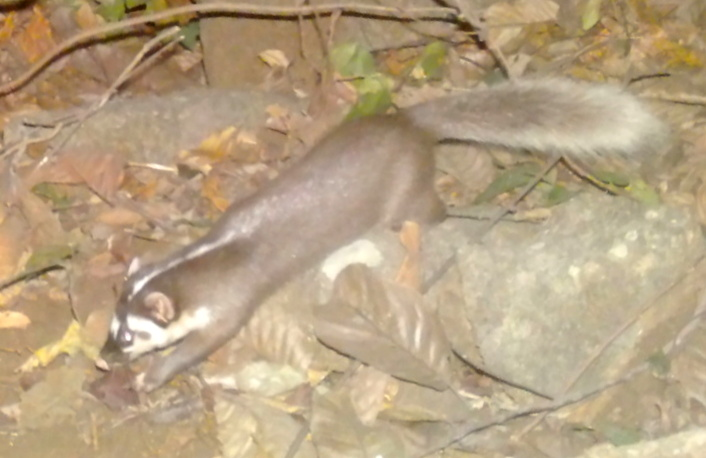
In Thailand

The Burmese ferret badger has been recorded in north-eastern India, Nepal, Myanmar, Thailand, Laos, Vietnam, Cambodia, Bangladesh, and Yunnan province in southwestern China. It inhabits evergreen forests, and is more commonly reported in disturbed habitat than in old-growth forests. Many reported sightings have been reported near residential or agricultural areas.

The exact distribution of the species is uncertain. The difficulty in determining the species' range is compounded by its strong resemblance to the Chinese ferret-badger, with which it overlaps in some areas and from which it cannot reliably be distinguished without examining its dentition.

== Description and taxonomy ==
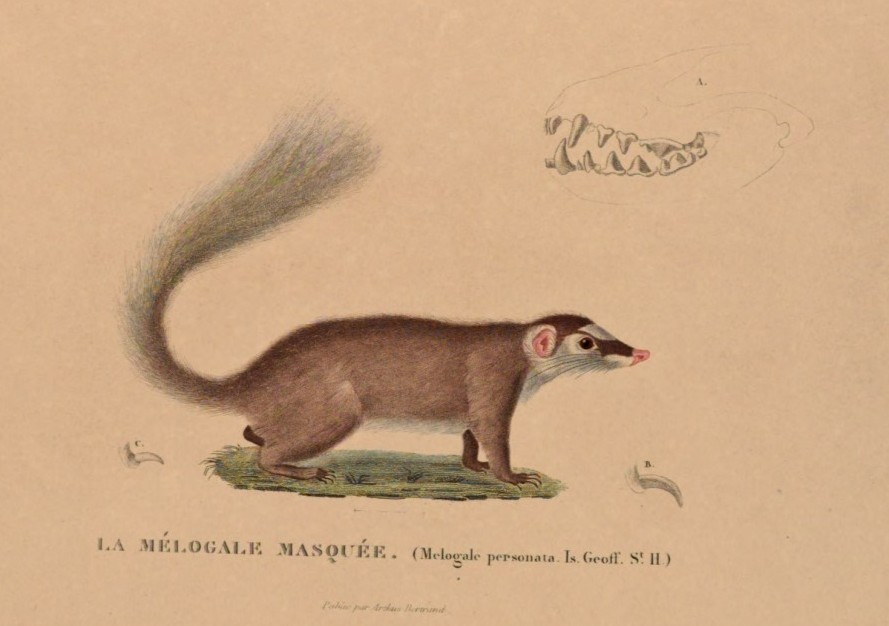
An illustration published with the original description of the species

Melogale personata was described by the French zoologist Isidore Geoffroy Saint-Hilaire in 1831 as the type species of the genus Melogale. According to Sainte-Hilaire the species name, personata, was chosen in reference to the animal's striking facial pattern. The holotype specimen is housed in the Muséum national d'Histoire naturelle.

Three subspecies are recognised:

- M. p. personata, northeastern India and Bangladesh to southern Myanmar and Thailand
- M. p. nipalensis, Nepal (previously described as a distinct species, M. nepalensis)
- M. p. pierrei, Cambodia, southern China, Laos and Vietnam.

== As a potential zoonotic disease vector ==
A tick collected from a road-killed Burmese ferret-badger was positive for a strain of Rickettsia japonica, a bacteria which causes spotted fever in humans, implicating M. personata as a potential reservoir for the pathogen. The Burmese ferret-badger has also been suggested as a possible reservoir for SARS coronavirus.

== Threats and conservation status ==
While there is no evidence to suggest that the Burmese ferret-badger is specifically targeted by hunters, it has been caught in traps targeting other species.

The Burmese ferret badger is listed as Least Concern on the IUCN Red List.
