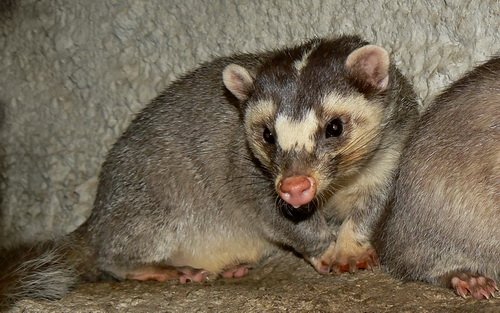
- At Prague Zoo

Conservation status
- Least Concern (IUCN 3.1)

Scientific classification
- Kingdom: Animalia
- Phylum: Chordata
- Class: Mammalia
- Infraclass: Placentalia
- Order: Carnivora
- Family: Mustelidae
- Genus: Melogale
- Species: M. moschata

Binomial name
- Melogale moschata (Gray, 1831)
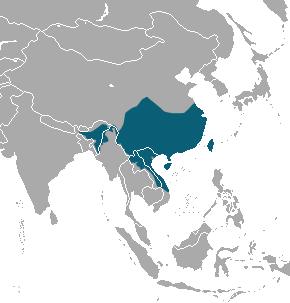
- Chinese ferret-badger range (also includes Formosan ferret-badger in Taiwan)

Synonyms
- Helictis subaurantiaca

= Chinese ferret-badger =

Species of carnivore

The Chinese ferret-badger (Melogale moschata), also known as the small-toothed ferret-badger, is a member of the Mustelidae, and widely distributed in Southeast Asia. It is listed as Least Concern on the IUCN Red List and considered tolerant of modified habitat.

The Chinese ferret-badger is densely distributed from Northeast India north to Central China south to northern Indochina. The Formosan ferret-badger (M. subaurantiaca) of Taiwan was formerly considered conspecific, but is now thought to be a distinct species.

== Description ==
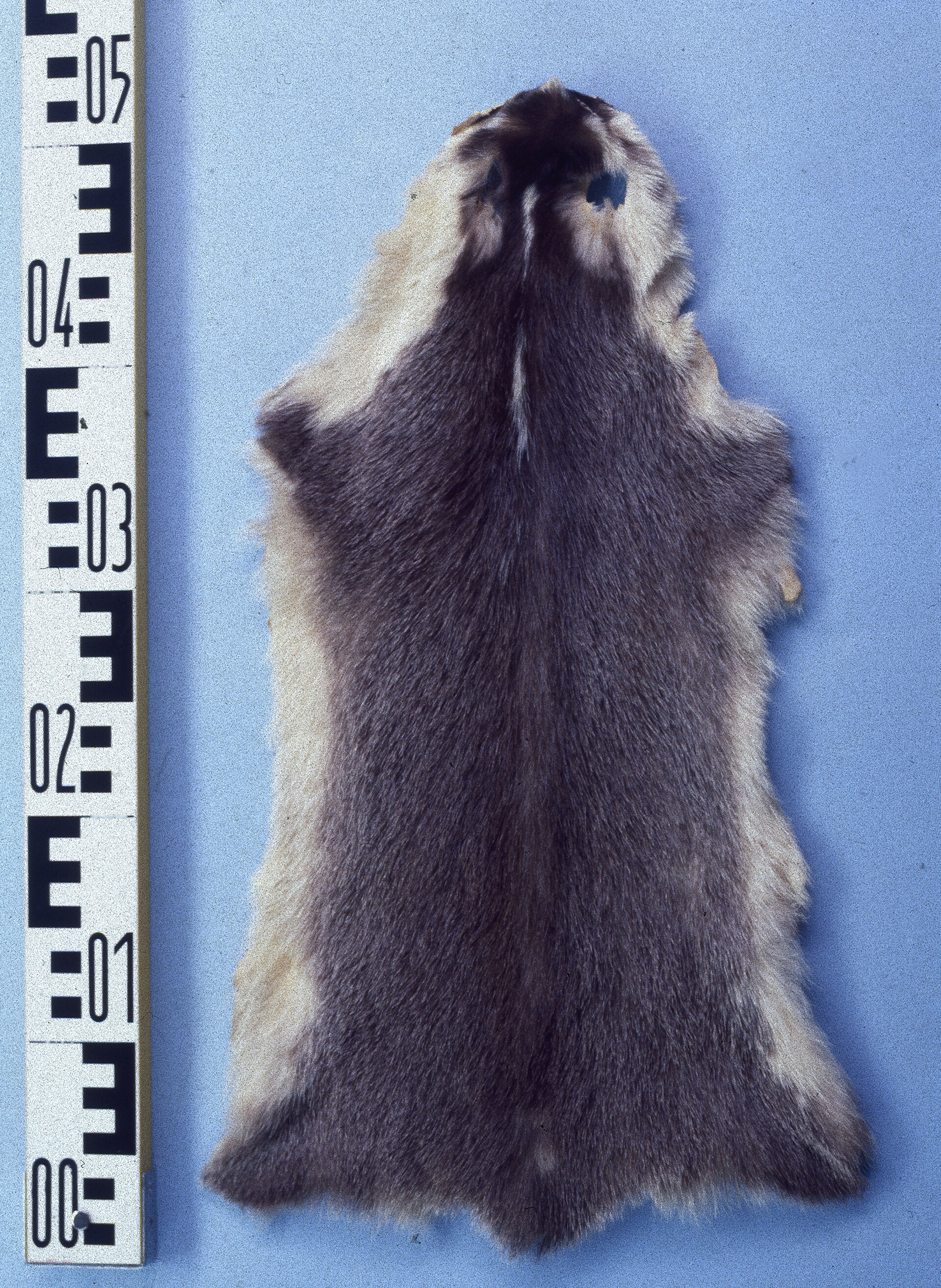
Fur skin of a Chinese ferret-badger

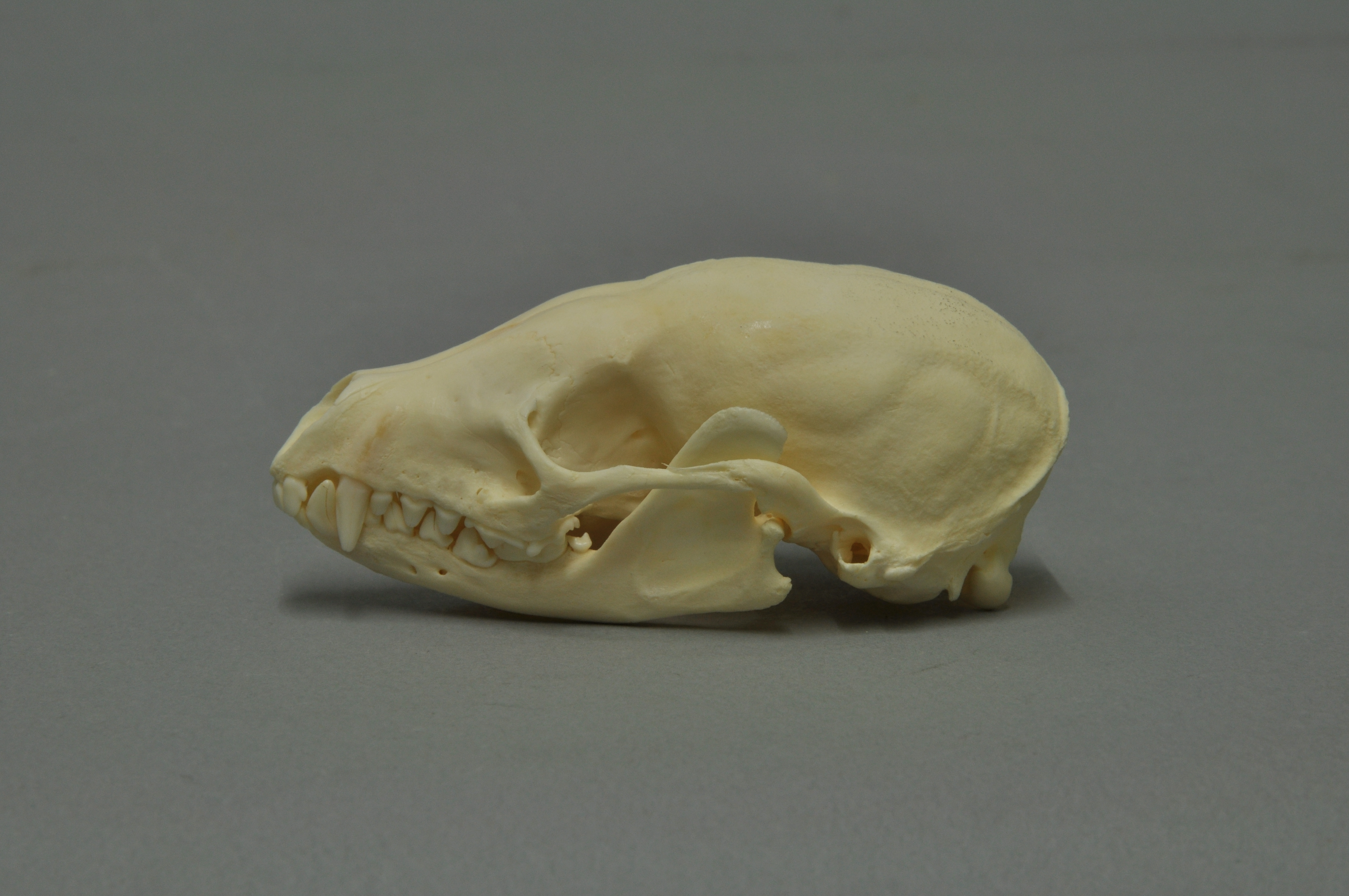
Skull of a Chinese ferret-badger

Distinctive mask-like face markings distinguish the Chinese ferret-badger from most other oriental mustelids, although the other members of the genus Melogale have similar facial markings. The average body size of the Chinese ferret-badger is 33 to 43 centimetres (13 to 17 in) with a tail of 15 to 23 centimetres (5.9 to 9.1 in).

== Distribution and habitat ==
The Chinese ferret-badger lives in grassland, open forests, and tropical rainforests from northeast India to southern China, including Hainan Island, and south to Hong Kong and northern Indochina. They tolerate human disturbance well, and temporarily reside in agricultural areas such as rice paddies, soybean, cotton, or grass fields.

The ferret-badger acclimates well to areas of human habitation, taking advantage of human-made sites suitable as resting spots, such as firewood stacks and rock piles, and using farmland and vegetable gardens as feeding sites. Ferret-badgers create limited conflicts with surrounding human populations, as they rarely prey on chickens or livestock, and tend to not damage property.

== Behaviour and ecology ==
The Chinese ferret-badger is active at dusk and at night. It is a good climber. When alarmed it emits foul-smelling anal secretions. It rests during the day in burrows, such as small rodents' dens, or natural formations, such as rock crevices. They also construct makeshift shelters in shallow depressions in the ground.

They have small home ranges that, according to the results of a study from 1994 to 1996, average around 10.6 ha (26 acres) in area. The home ranges of male and female ferret-badgers overlap, suggesting a lack of territoriality between members of the species. Despite their small home ranges, however, ferret-badgers are relatively nomadic creatures, moving from one resting spot to the next without establishing permanent residence. Ferret-badgers may establish single-use resting spots, or choose to inhabit a particular place for a period of several days.

=== Diet ===
The Chinese ferret-badger feeds on fruit, insects, small animals, and worms. Earthworms, amphibians and insects are important components of its diet. It also eats fleshy fruits such as of Chinese plum, oriental raisin tree, date-plum and Chinese kiwi.

=== Reproduction ===
Chinese ferret-badgers mate in March. The female gives birth to a litter of up to three young in May or June. The new-borns are blind and well-furred, with the same colour pattern as the adults. Their eyes open at about two weeks of age.

=== Diseases ===
The Chinese ferret-badger is associated with reported outbreaks of human rabies in southeastern China and Taiwan, which were first reported in 1997 and the most recent case in 2008. There have been no reported deaths in these cases; however, there is currently no rabies vaccine for ferret-badgers.

== Threats ==
Ferret-badgers are among the most hunted fur-bearing animals in Southern China, but maintain relatively high population densities in part due to their nearly-inedible meat and the low prices of their pelts.
