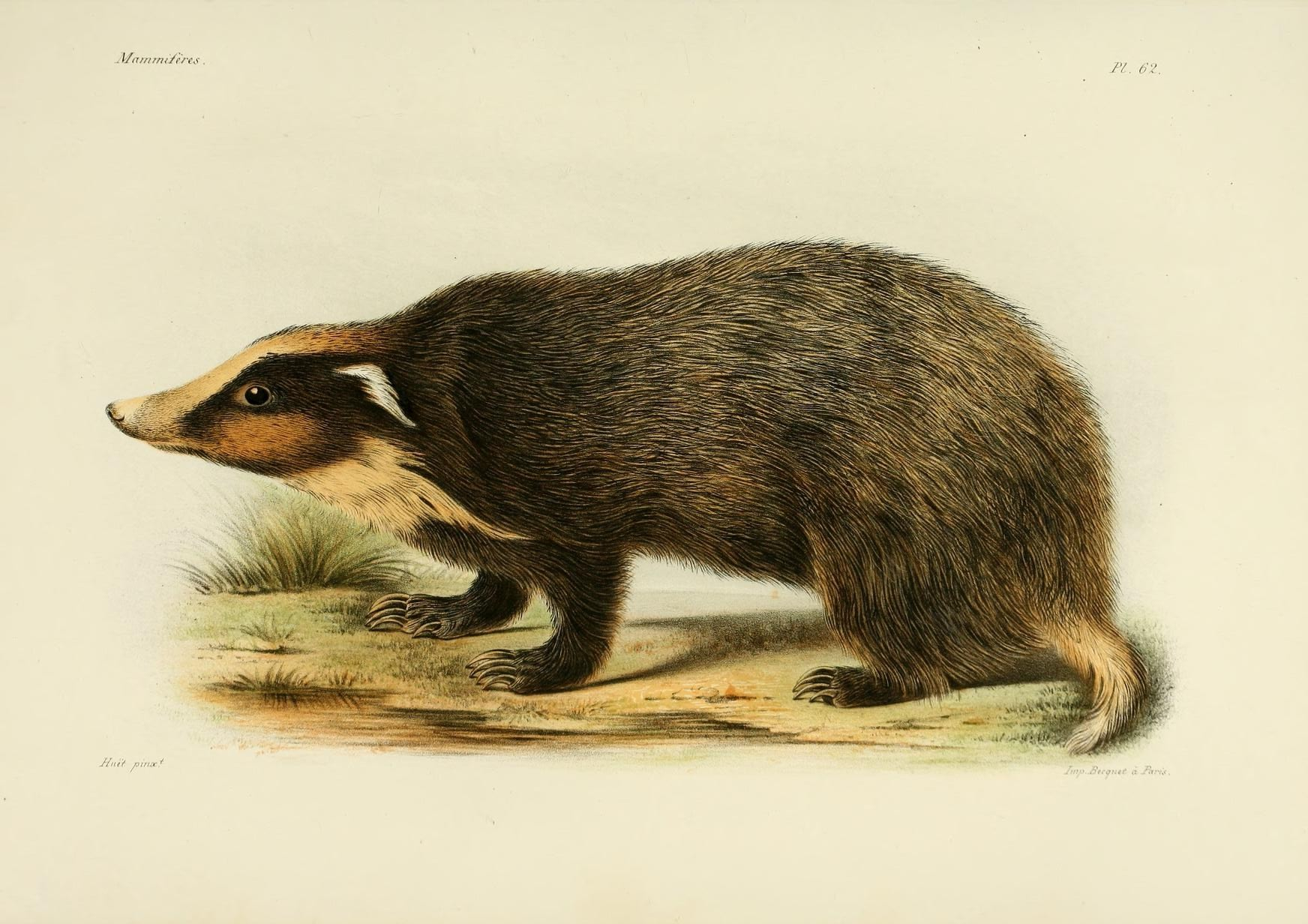

Conservation status
- Least Concern (IUCN 3.1)

Scientific classification
- Kingdom: Animalia
- Phylum: Chordata
- Class: Mammalia
- Order: Carnivora
- Family: Mustelidae
- Genus: Arctonyx
- Species: A. albogularis

Binomial name
- Arctonyx albogularis (Blyth, 1853)

= Northern hog badger =

Species of carnivore

The northern hog badger (Arctonyx albogularis) is a species of mustelid native to South and East Asia.

== Taxonomy ==
It was formerly considered a subspecies of the greater hog badger (A. collaris) when A. collaris was considered the only species in Arctonyx, but a 2008 study split the genus into three species, including A. albogularis and A. hoevenii (Sumatran hog badger).

== Description ==
The species is much smaller than the greater hog badger and has a more gracile skull. Elderly animals only have a moderately developed sagittal crest, in contrast to the two other species in the genus. It has a softer pelage with longer hairs than the other Arctonyx, with thick underfur during the winter months. It has blackish forequarters, with the mid-back, tail, and hindquarters either being white or mixed with white. It is darker than the greater hog badger but lighter than the Sumatran hog badger. The species displays significant geographical variation, and some forms may represent distinct subspecies.

== Distribution ==
The species is ranges from northeast India and Bangladesh northeast to most of eastern China. An isolated record is known from eastern Mongolia. The species may potentially exist in Nepal and Bhutan, but this remains unconfirmed.
