= Corumictis =

Corumictis Temporal range: Early - Late Oligocene 28.8–25.9 Ma

Scientific classification
- Domain: Eukaryota
- Kingdom: Animalia
- Phylum: Chordata
- Class: Mammalia
- Order: Carnivora
- Family: Mustelidae
- Genus: †Corumictis; Paterson et al., 2020
- Species: †C. wolsani

Binomial name
- †Corumictis wolsani Paterson et al., 2020

Extinct genus of mustelid

Corumictis is an extinct genus of mustelid from the Early Oligocene (Arikareean) of North America, specifically Oregon. It contains a single species Corumictis wolsani, which is notable for being the oldest currently known mustelid.

== Name ==
The generic name is derived from the Latin words Corum (northwest) and ictis (weasel). The specific name honors paleontologist Mieczysław Wolsan, who extensively studied the evolutionary history of fossil musteloids.

== Discovery ==
The skull of Corumictis was discovered around 2005 at the John Day Formation in northern Oregon, which dates to between 28.8 million and 25.9 million years ago. The skull was originally believed to have belonged to an ancient feline, but was re-examined by palaeontologist Ryan Paterson of Carlton University in Canada, who concluded that it was a mustelid instead.

== Description ==
Corumictis was very small, about the size of the living least weasel; its skull measured just 4 cm (1.6 in) long. It is considered closely allied with Plesictis and certain Oligobunine mustelids. Corumictis has very sharp teeth, and compared to modern mustelids it lacks an alisphenoid canal and a postprotocrista on its first molars. It retains a dorsally deep suprameatal fossa, a feature occasionally considered unique to procyonids.
