= Brachypsalis =

Brachypsalis Temporal range: Miocene

Scientific classification
- Domain: Eukaryota
- Kingdom: Animalia
- Phylum: Chordata
- Class: Mammalia
- Order: Carnivora
- Family: Mustelidae
- Subfamily: †Oligobuninae
- Genus: †Brachypsalis; Cope, 1890

Species
- B. hyaenoides B. matutinus B. modicus B. obliquidens B. pachycephalus

Extinct genus of carnivores

Brachypsalis is an extinct genus of mustelids, which existed during the Miocene period.

The genus was first described by E. D. Cope in 1890. A similar genus, Brachypsaloides, was later identified as synonymous with Brachypsalis. Cope assigned the genus to the family Mustelidae, whilst J. A. Baskin assigned it to the subfamily Oligobuninae in 1998.

Five species have been identified in the genus: B. hyaenoides, B. matutinus, B. modicus, B. obliquidens, and B. pachycephalus. A sixth species, B. simplicidens, was later determined to be synonymous with Megalictis ferox.
