= Zodiolestes =

Zodiolestes Temporal range: Miocene, 23–16 Ma

Scientific classification
- Domain: Eukaryota
- Kingdom: Animalia
- Phylum: Chordata
- Class: Mammalia
- Order: Carnivora
- Family: Mustelidae
- Subfamily: †Oligobuninae
- Genus: †Zodiolestes; Riggs, 1942

Species
- Zodiolestes daimonelixensis Riggs, 1942; Zodiolestes freundi Labs Hochstein 2007

Extinct genus of carnivores

Zodiolestes is a genus of mustelids, now extinct, which existed during the Miocene period.

The genus was first described in 1942, by E. S. Riggs, who identified the sister genus Promartes at the same time, and assigned to the family Procyonidae. In 1998 it was assigned to the subfamily Oligobuninae of the family Mustelidae. Two species have been identified in the genus: Z. daimonelixensis and Z. freundi.

Z. daimonelixensis showed digging adaptations, and one fossil was found curled up in the "corkscrew" burrow of the Miocene beaver, Palaeocastor. Zodiolestes was most likely a predator of these fossorial beavers. This situation was analogous to the modern day prairie dog (genus Cynomys) and its predator the black-footed ferret (Mustela nigripes).
