= Promartes =

Promartes Temporal range: Miocene

Scientific classification
- Domain: Eukaryota
- Kingdom: Animalia
- Phylum: Chordata
- Class: Mammalia
- Order: Carnivora
- Family: Mustelidae
- Subfamily: †Oligobuninae
- Genus: †Promartes; Riggs, 1942

Species
- P. darbyi; P. gemmarosae; P. lepidus (Matthew, 1907); P. olcotti Riggs, 1942 (type); P. vantasselensis

Extinct genus of carnivores

Promartes is a genus of mustelids, now extinct, which existed during the Miocene period.

== Taxonomy ==
The genus was first described in 1942, by E. S. Riggs, who identified the sister genus Zodiolestes at the same time, and assigned to the family Mustelidae. It belongs to the subfamily Oligobuninae. Five species have been identified in the genus: Promartes darbyi, P. gemmarosae, P. lepidus, P. olcotti, andP. vantasselensis, three of which were originally identified as members of Oligobunis.
