= Sumatran hog badger =

Conservation status
- Least Concern (IUCN 3.1)

Scientific classification
- Kingdom: Animalia
- Phylum: Chordata
- Class: Mammalia
- Order: Carnivora
- Family: Mustelidae
- Genus: Arctonyx
- Species: A. hoevenii

Binomial name
- Arctonyx hoevenii (Hubrecht, 1891)
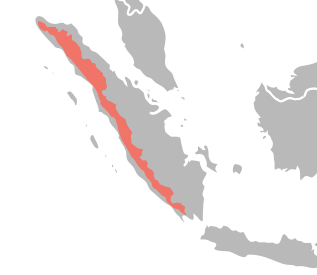
- Arctonyx hoevenii distribution

Species of carnivore

The Sumatran hog badger (Arctonyx hoevenii) is a species of mustelid endemic to the island of Sumatra in Indonesia.

== Taxonomy ==
Arctonyx hoevenii was formerly considered a subspecies of the greater hog badger (Arctonyx collaris), when it was considered the only species in the genus Arctonyx. However, in 2008, a study proposed splitting A. collaris into three species, with one of these being A. hoevenii. This finding was later followed by the American Society of Mammalogists.

== Description ==
The smallest species of Arctonyx, A. hoevenii grows to be about the size of a large housecat. Given its equatorial forest distribution, it also has sparser fur (for heat management) and a much darker pelage (for jungle camouflage) than the other two species in its genus. Their fur grows in a similar, albeit convergent, style to the raccoon dog of Japan and Northern Eurasia. The Sumatran hog badger is well-known for its "hog"-like snout, the feature which earns it its common name. Their claws, which are long, fairly sharp and well-adapted for digging and foraging, curve downwards much like a sun bear's claws, a species with which their range is shared.

== Distribution ==
The species is endemic to the high-altitude regions of Sumatra, namely the Barisan Range, which extends along the length of the island. Its range extends from lower foothills, beginning at around 700 metres (2,300 ft) up to the very highest areas on the island; in 1918, the skull of a Sumatran hog badger was discovered in the alpine zone of Gunung Kerinci. Their core habitat is generally montane and cloud forests and tropical subalpine meadows between 200 and 2,600 metres (660 and 8,530 ft) above sea level. Despite being restricted to a few select habitat types (on an island, no less) it is common throughout its range.
