= Oligobunis =

Oligobunis Temporal range: Miocene

Scientific classification
- Domain: Eukaryota
- Kingdom: Animalia
- Phylum: Chordata
- Class: Mammalia
- Order: Carnivora
- Family: Mustelidae
- Subfamily: †Oligobuninae
- Genus: †Oligobunis; Cope, 1881

Species
- O. crassivultus O. floridanus

Extinct genus of carnivores

Oligobunis is an extinct genus of mustelids, which existed during the Miocene epoch.

The genus was first described by E. D. Cope in 1881. Cope assigned the genus to the family Mustelidae, and J. A. Baskin assigned it to the subfamily Oligobuninae in 1998. Two species have been identified in the genus: O. crassivultus and O. floridanus. Three more - O. gemmarosae, O. lepidus, and O. vantasselensis - were later assigned to the genus Promartes. O. floridanus was a medium-sized badger type mustelid carnivore that filled the niche of small cats during the "cat gap" of the early to middle Miocene in North America. Its fossils have been discovered in Florida, Nebraska, and Oregon.
