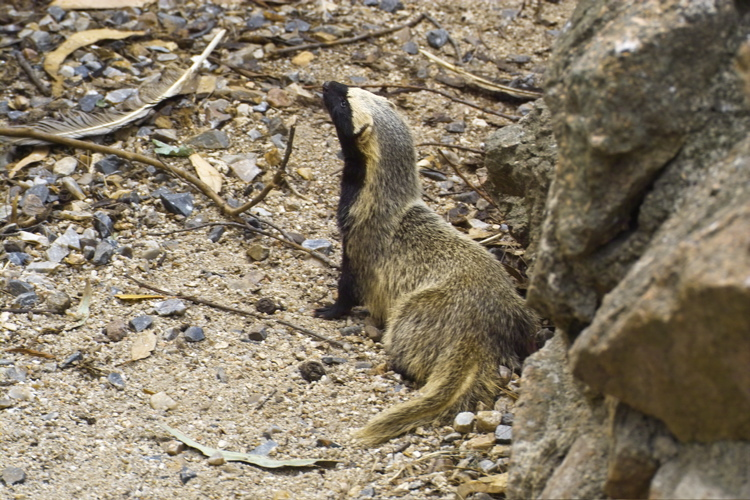

Scientific classification
- Kingdom: Animalia
- Phylum: Chordata
- Class: Mammalia
- Order: Carnivora
- Family: Mustelidae
- Subfamily: Ictonychinae
- Genus: Galictis; Bell, 1826

Type species
- Viverra vittata

Species
- Galictis cuja Galictis vittata
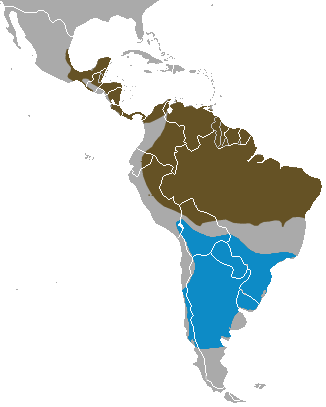
- Galictis range

= Galictis =

Grison

Genus of carnivores

A grison (/ˈɡrɪzən/, /ˈɡraɪsən/) is any mustelid in the genus Galictis. Native to Central and South America, the genus contains two extant species: the greater grison (Galictis vittata), which is found widely in South America, through Central America to southern Mexico; and the lesser grison (Galictis cuja), which is restricted to the southern half of South America.

== Names ==
The generic name Galictis joins two Greek words: galē (γαλῆ, "weasel") and iktis (ἴκτις, marten/weasel). Compare the word Galidictis (a mongoose genus).

The common name grison is from a French word for "gray", a variant of gris, also meaning "gray".

Locally, in Spanish, it is referred to as a huroncito (literally "little ferret") or grisón. In Portuguese, it is a furão.

== Description ==
Grisons measure up to 60 cm (24 in) in length, and weigh between 1 and 3 kg (2.2 and 6.6 lb). The lesser grison is slightly smaller than the greater grison. Grisons generally resemble a honey badger, but with a smaller, thinner body. The pelage along the back is a frosted gray with black legs, throat, face, and belly. A sharp white stripe extends from the forehead to the back of the neck.

== Habitat ==
They are found in a wide range of habitats from semi-open shrub and woodland to low-elevation forests. They are generally terrestrial, burrowing and nesting in holes in fallen trees or rock crevices, often living underground. They are omnivorous, consuming fruit and small animals (including mammals). Little is known about grison behaviour for multiple reasons, one of which is that their necks are so wide compared to their heads. This has made radio tracking problematic.

== Evolution ==
=== Extant species ===
Genus Galictis – Bell, 1826 – two species
Common name	Scientific name and subspecies	Range	Size and ecology	IUCN status and estimated population
Lesser grison	Galictis cuja (Molina, 1782) Four subspecies: G. c. cuja; G. c. furax; G. c. huronax; G. c. luteola	Brazil, Chile, Peru, Argentina, Uruguay, and Paraguay	Size: Habitat: Diet:	LC
Greater grison	Galictis vittata (Schreber, 1776) Five subspecies: G. v. vittata; G. v. andina; G. v. brasiliensis; G. v. canaster; † G. v. fossilis	southern Mexico in the north, to central Brazil, Peru, and Bolivia in the south	Size: Habitat: Diet:	LC

=== Fossils ===
Grisons first appeared in South America during the early Pleistocene about 2.5 million years ago. They may be descended from the fossil genera Trigonictis and Sminthosinus, which lived in North America during the mid to late Pliocene. There are at least three known fossil species, all of which were found in Argentina:

- † Galictis hennigi
- † Galictis sanandresensis
- † Galictis sorgentinii
