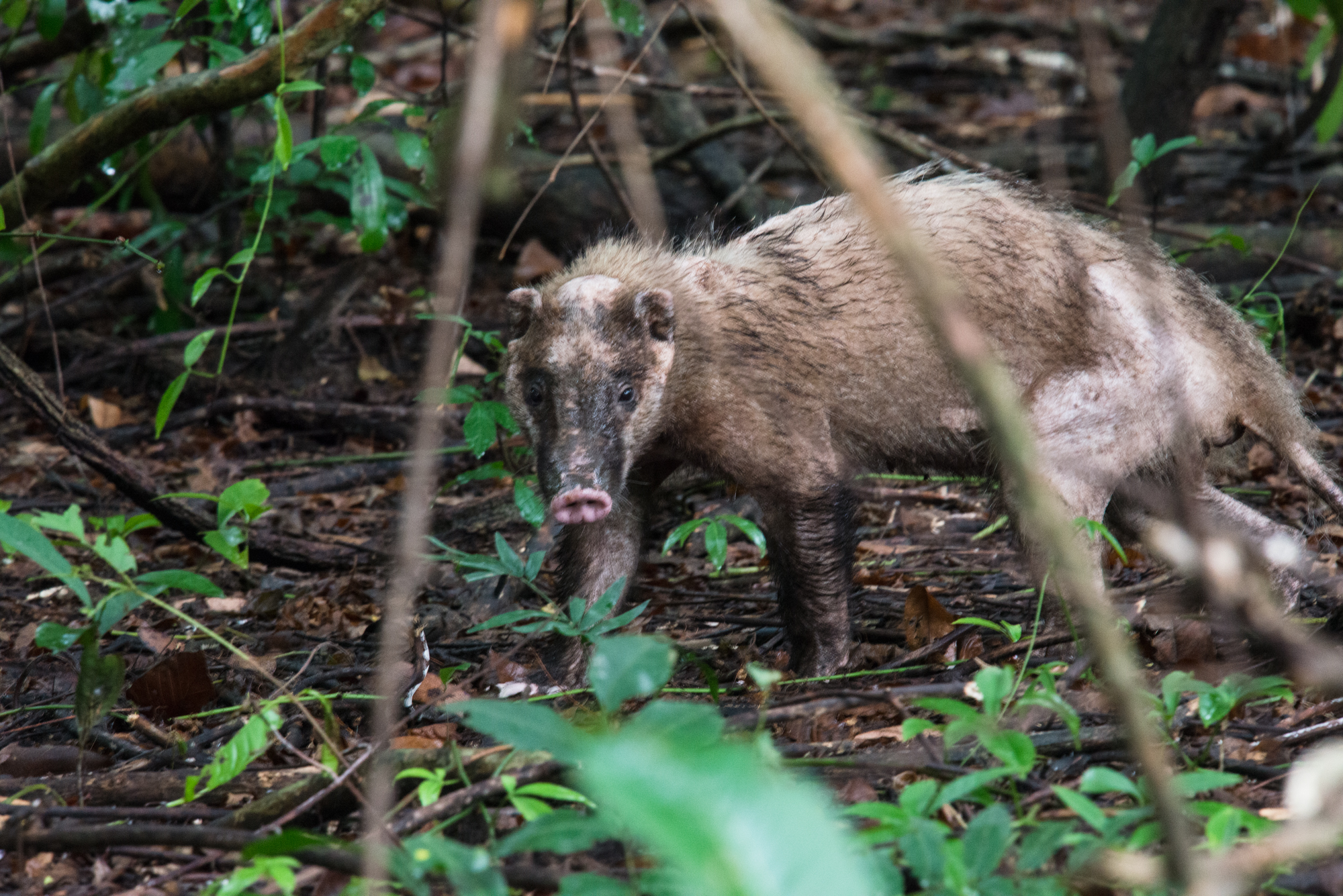
- A. collaris

Scientific classification
- Kingdom: Animalia
- Phylum: Chordata
- Class: Mammalia
- Order: Carnivora
- Family: Mustelidae
- Subfamily: Melinae
- Genus: Arctonyx; Cuvier, 1825

Type species
- Arctonyx collaris

Species
- A. albogularis; A. collaris; A. hoevenii
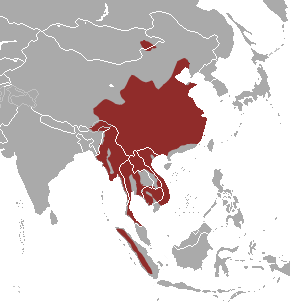
- Distribution of the genus Arctonyx

= Hog badger =

Common name for three species of mammal

Hog badgers are three species of mustelid in the genus Arctonyx. They represent one of the two genera in the subfamily Melinae, alongside the true badgers (genus Meles).

== Taxonomy ==
Arctonyx was formerly considered a monotypic genus containing one species, A. collaris, but a 2008 study found it to comprise 3 distinct species, a finding later followed by the American Society of Mammalogists.

== Species ==
Three species are known:

Image	Scientific name	Distribution
	Northern hog badger (A. albogularis)	South and East Asia.
	Greater hog badger (A. collaris)	Southeast Asia.
	Sumatran hog badger (A. hoevenii)	Sumatra in Indonesia.

== Conservation ==
The IUCN considers the greater hog badger (A. collaris), the northern hog badger (A. albogularis) and the Sumatran hog badger (A. hoevenii) as three separate species. The greater hog badger is listed as a Vulnerable species. The other two are listed as Least Concern.
