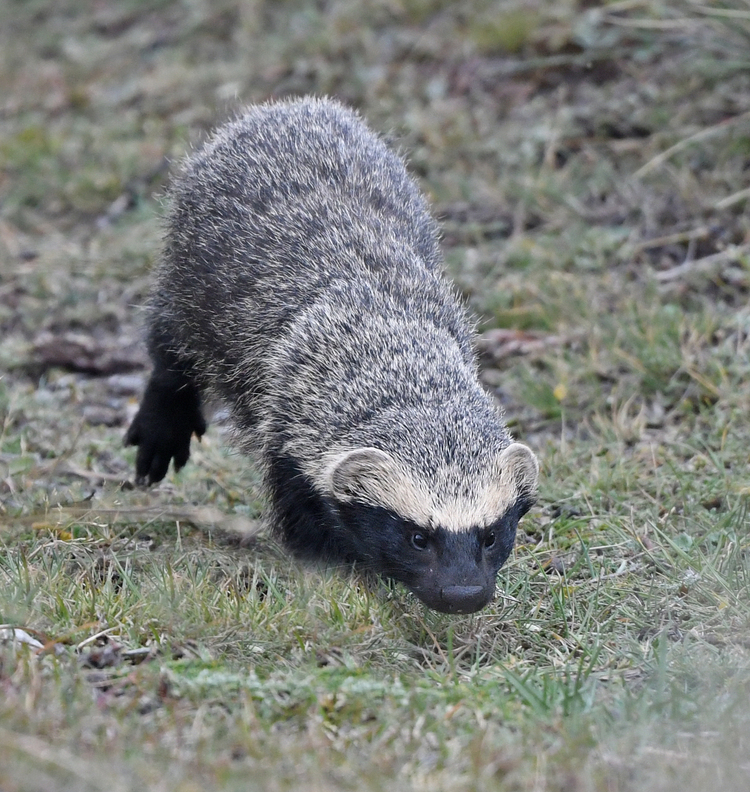

Conservation status
- Least Concern (IUCN 3.1)

Scientific classification
- Kingdom: Animalia
- Phylum: Chordata
- Class: Mammalia
- Order: Carnivora
- Family: Mustelidae
- Genus: Galictis
- Species: G. cuja

Binomial name
- Galictis cuja (Molina, 1782)
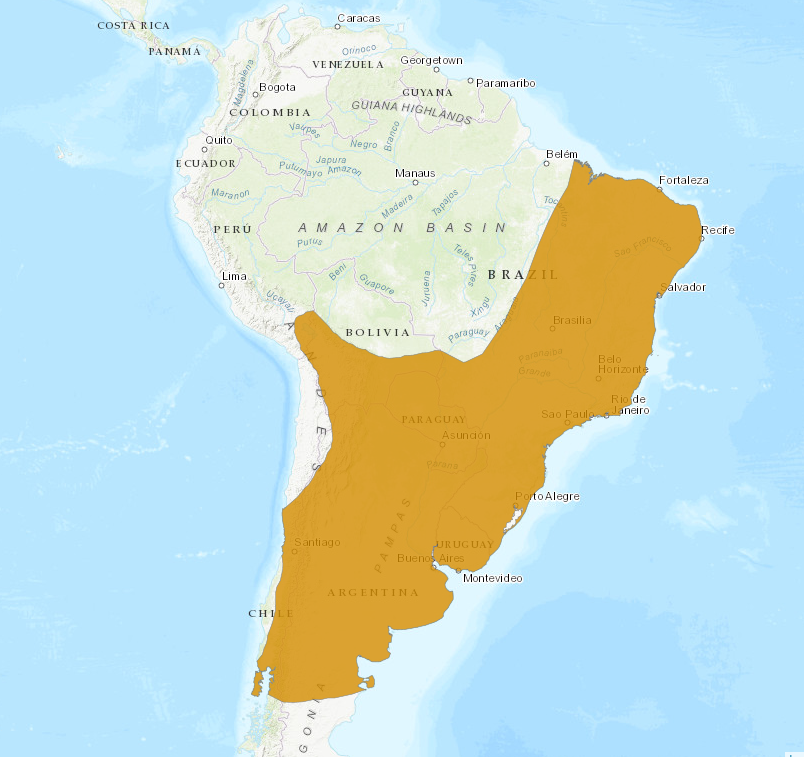
- Lesser grison range

= Lesser grison =

Species of carnivore

The lesser grison (Galictis cuja) is a species of mustelid from South America.

== Description ==
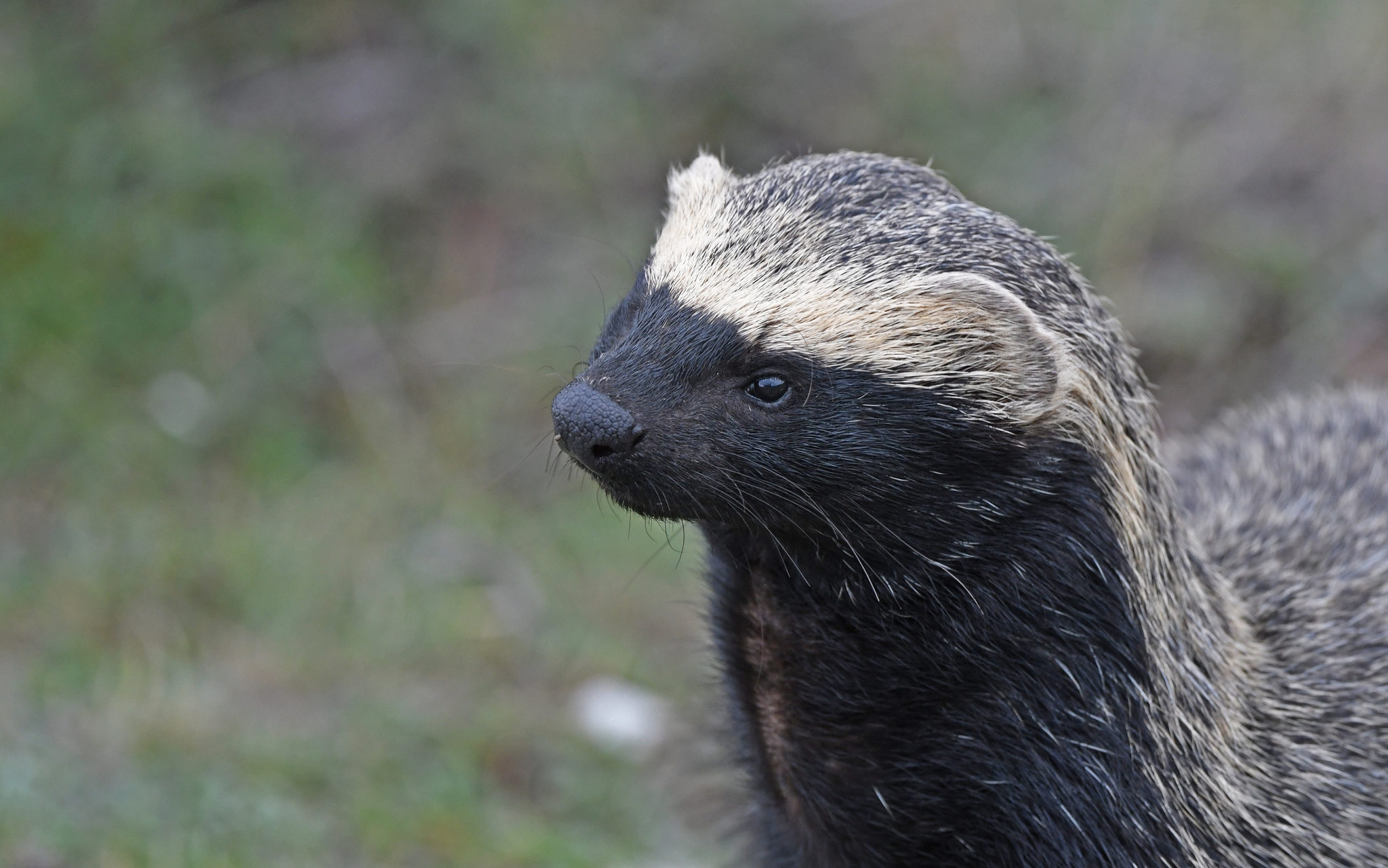
Close-up of head

Lesser grisons have a long, slender body, short legs, and a bushy tail. They have a long neck and a small head with a flattened forehead and rounded ears. They are smaller than the closely related greater grison, with a head-body length of 27 to 52 cm (11 to 20 in) and a tail 14 to 19 cm (5.5 to 7.5 in) long. Adults weigh from 1.2 to 2.4 kg (2.6 to 5.3 lb). Females are slighter smaller and more slender than males.

The top of the head, the back and flanks, and the tail have coarse black guard hairs with buff-coloured tips over a softer undercoat, giving them a grizzled, greyish colour. The remainder of the body is black or nearly so, apart from a pale, buff-coloured stripe running from the forehead to the shoulders along the lower margin of the grey furred area. The feet are webbed, with five toes ending in sharp, curved claws.

== Distribution and habitat ==
Lesser grisons are found throughout most of southern South America from sea level to as high as 4,200 m (13,800 ft) elevation. They are found in a wide range of habitats, although generally near water, including grasslands, forests, scrub, and mountain meadows. They are also known to inhabit agricultural land and pasture in some areas.

Four subspecies of Galictis cuja are recognised:

- G. c. cuja – southwestern Bolivia, western Argentina, central Chile
- G. c. furax – southern Brazil, northeastern Argentina, Uruguay, and Paraguay
- G. c. huronax – south-central Bolivia, eastern Argentina
- G. c. luteola – extreme southern Peru, western Bolivia and northern Chile

== Biology and behaviour ==
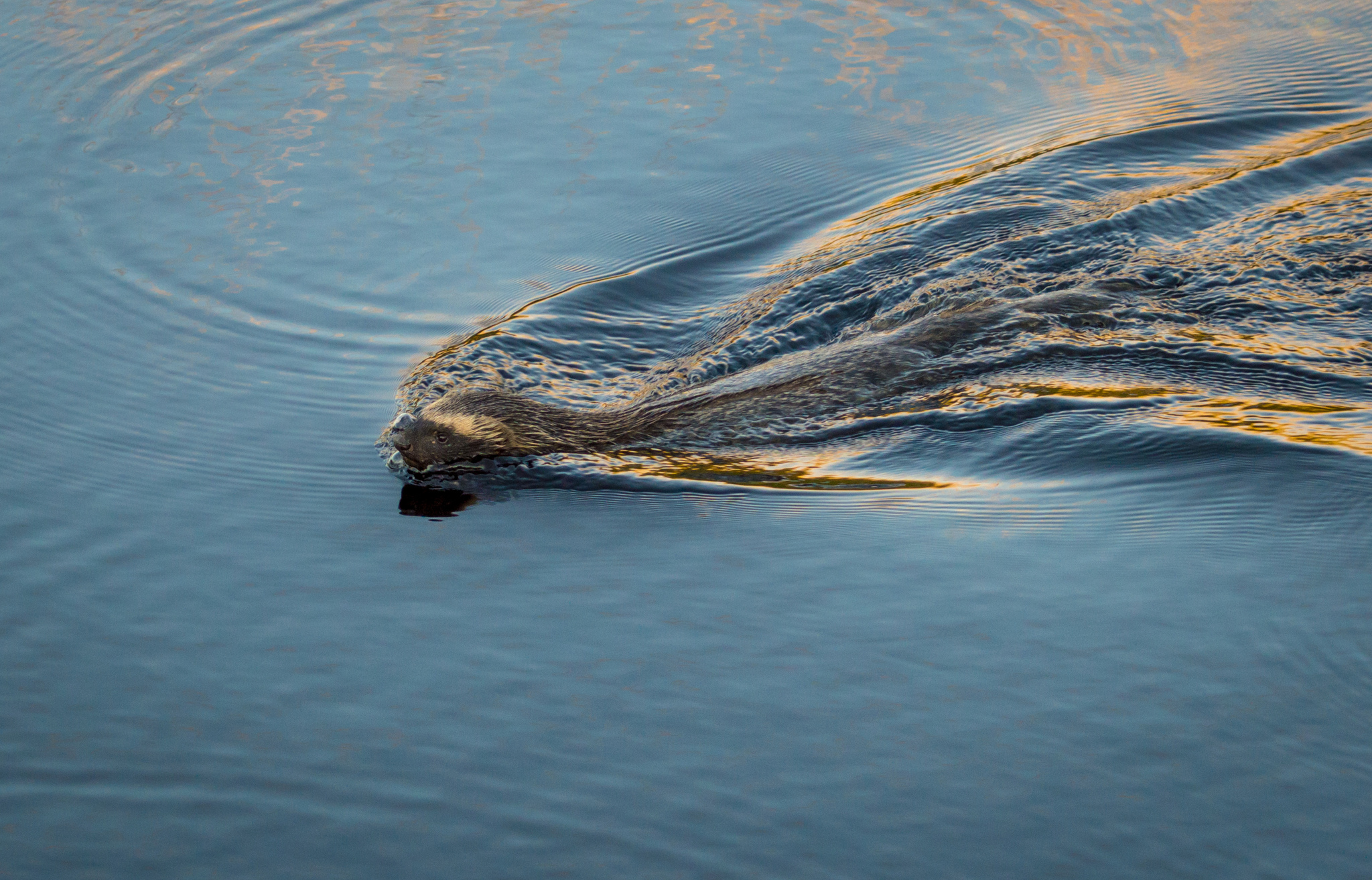
Swimming

Lesser grisons are carnivorous, feeding on small to medium-sized rodents, as well as rabbits, birds, frogs, lizards, and snakes. They can also eat fruits, such as avocados. They are among the major predators on cavies, including wild guinea pigs, and also of nesting grebes.

They are semiplantigrade, walking partly on the soles of their feet, and despite the webbing, their feet are adapted more for running and climbing than for swimming. They possess anal scent glands that spray a noxious chemical similar to, but probably weaker than, that of skunks. They are monogamous, hunting together when raising their litters of two to five young.

Lesser grisons hunt primarily during the day, locating their prey at least partly by scent. They are either solitary or live in small family groups of parents and offspring, which travel together in single file. They are said to be particularly fierce, and to play with their prey for up to 45 minutes before eating it. During the night, they sleep in hollow trees, natural crevices, or excavated burrows. Burrows may be as deep as 4 m (13 ft), and have entrances obscured by leaves.

The lesser grison was found to be a host of an intestinal acanthocephalan parasitic worm, Pachysentis gethi.

== Relations with humans ==
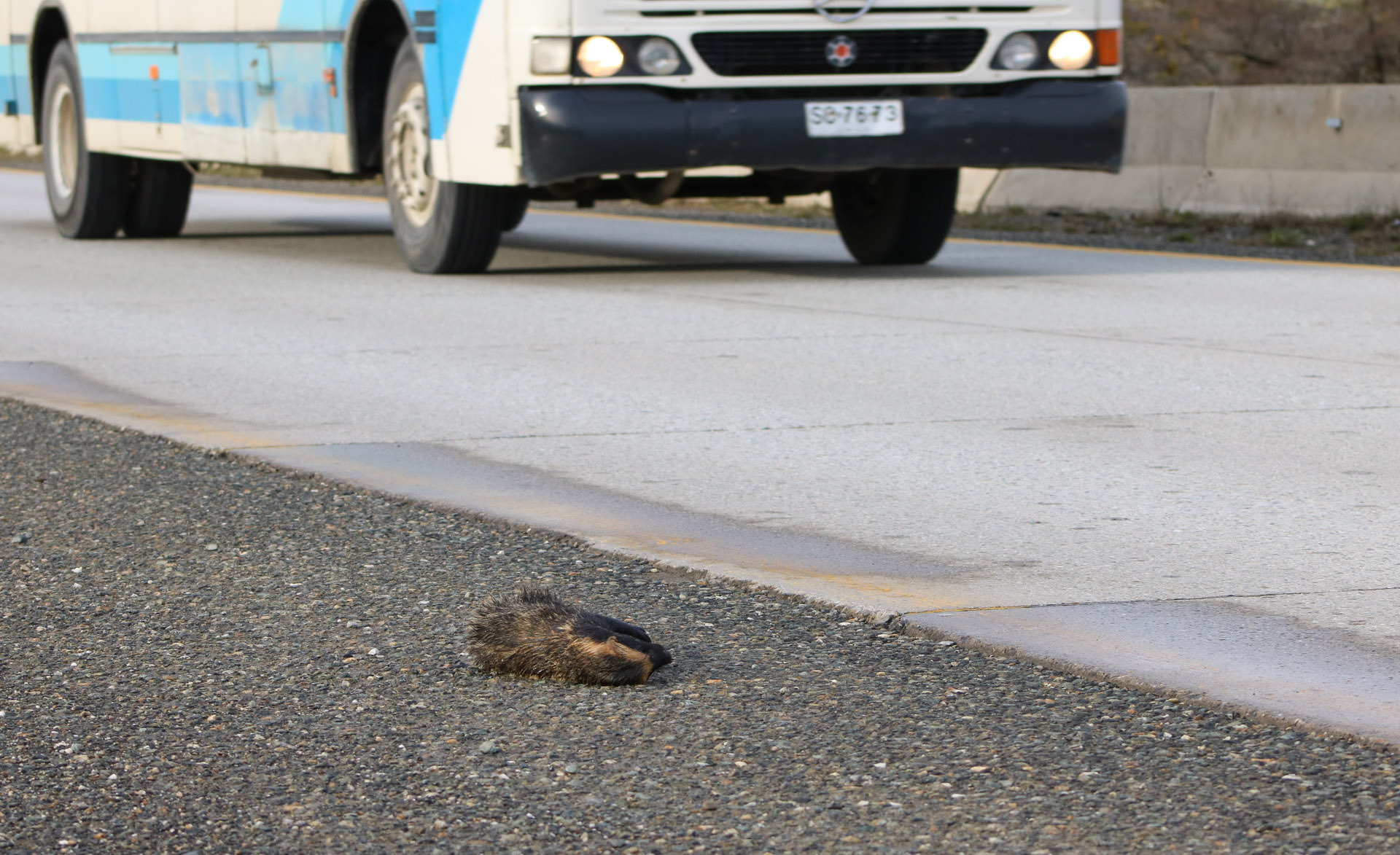
Roadkill

Lesser grisons can be tamed if raised from a young age. They were used in the past to hunt wild chinchillas, pursuing them down burrows in a similar manner to ferrets, although chinchillas are now too rare for this to be viable. They are still sometimes kept to control rodents on farms, although they may also be hunted, especially where they are thought to prey on domestic poultry. They have also been reported to be amongst the most frequent species among mammalian roadkill in Brazil.

Lesser grisons can act as a reservoir for Chagas disease.

The bodies of lesser grisons have also been used as magical charms in Bolivia, where their pelts are stuffed with wool and decorated with ribbons and paper to be used in ritual offerings to Pachamama. One apparent sacrificial burial from Argentina has been dated to 1,420 BP. It was interred together with human remains, wearing a decorated collar, placed on an animal pelt and associated with numerous other funerary goods and bodies of mice.
