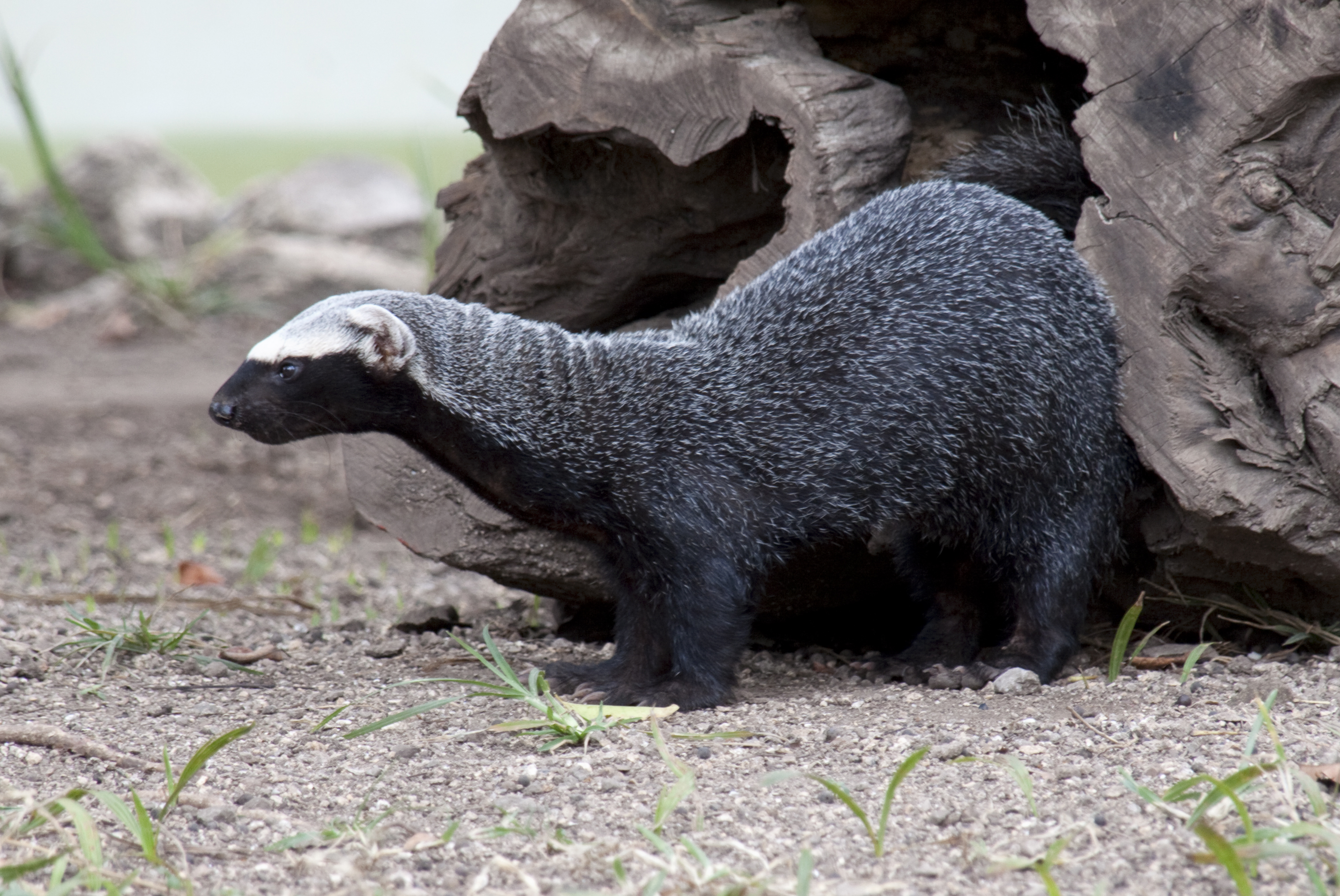

Conservation status
- Least Concern (IUCN 3.1)

Scientific classification
- Kingdom: Animalia
- Phylum: Chordata
- Class: Mammalia
- Order: Carnivora
- Family: Mustelidae
- Genus: Galictis
- Species: G. vittata

Binomial name
- Galictis vittata (Schreber, 1776)
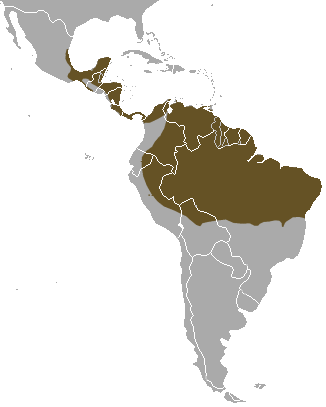
- Greater grison range

Synonyms
- Galictis allamandi Bell 1837

= Greater grison =

Species of carnivore

The greater grison (Galictis vittata) is a species of mustelid native to southern Mexico, Central America, and South America.

== Description ==
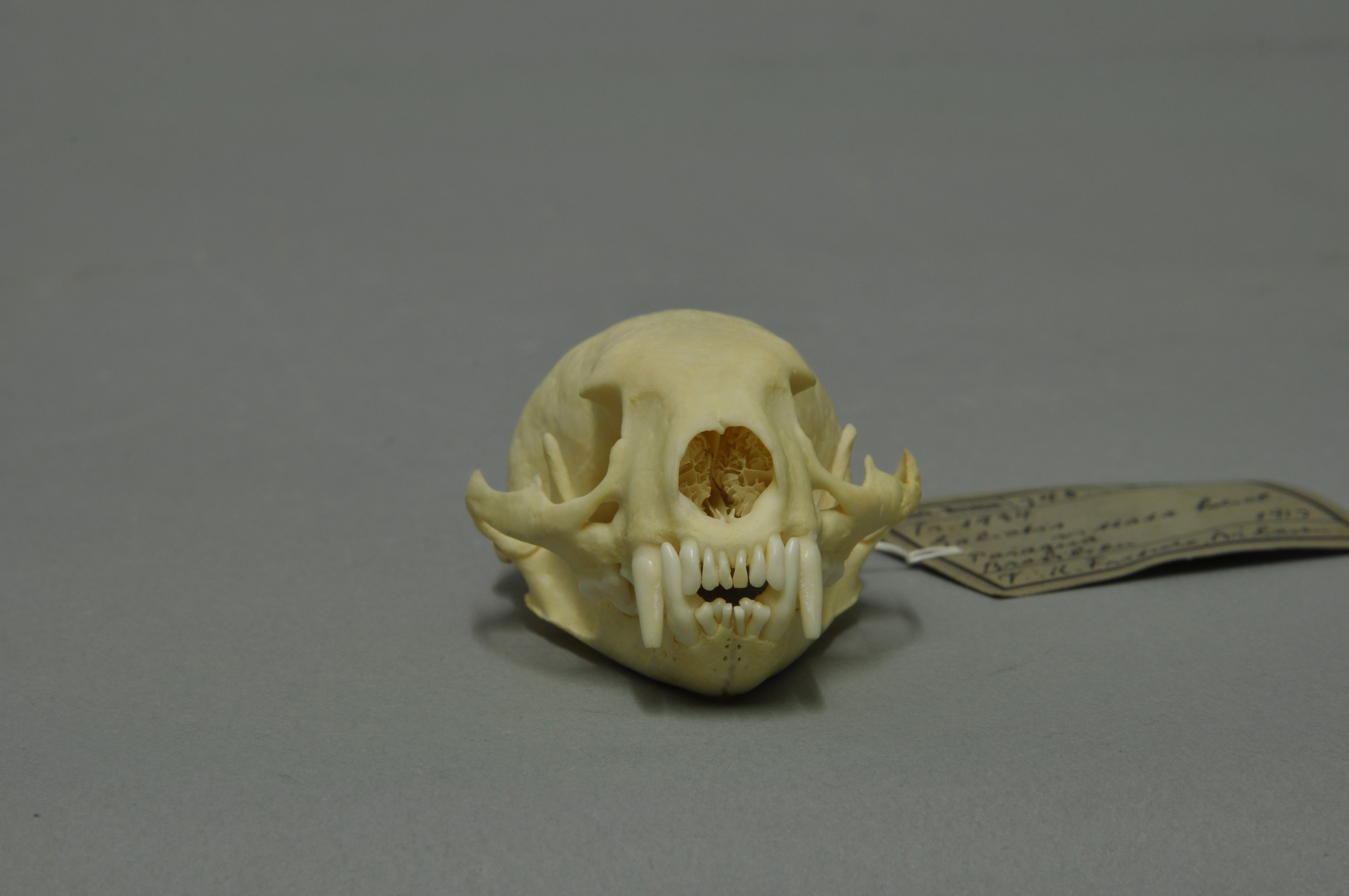
Skull of a greater grison

The greater grison is a slender animal with short legs, a long neck, and a short, bushy tail. It is similar in appearance to the closely related lesser grison, from which it can be most readily distinguished by its greater size, with a head-body length ranging from 45 to 60 cm (18 to 24 in). Adults weigh between 1.5 and 3.8 kg (3.3 and 8.4 lb) in the wild, but may become larger when reared in captivity.

The back, flanks, top of the head, and tail are grizzled grey in color, while the rest of the body is much darker, and usually solid black. A narrow, whitish stripe separates the darker and lighter fur on the head and shoulder, but not further back, where the two colors may, in some individuals, blur into one another. The tail is 14 to 20 cm (5.5 to 7.9 in) long and covered with bushy hair similar in color to that on the animal's back. The head is flattened and broad, with short, rounded ears, and dark brown to black eyes. The legs are muscular, with five webbed toes, each ending in a sharp, curved claw.

== Distribution and habitat ==
Greater grisons are native to North and South America, ranging from southern Mexico in the north, to central Brazil, Peru, and Bolivia in the south. They inhabit a wide range of forest and cerrado habitats, and are usually seen near rivers and streams. They are typically found at elevations below 500 m (1,600 ft), but they may be found as high as 2,000 m (6,600 ft) in some parts of the Bolivian Andes. In some regions, they may also be found in cultivated areas, such as plantations and rice paddies. Four living and one fossil subspecies are recognised:

- G. v. vittata – northern South America
- G. v. andina – Peru and Bolivia
- G. v. brasiliensis – Brazil
- G. v. canaster – Central America and southern Mexico
- † G. v. fossilis – Pleistocene Brazil

== Behaviour ==
Greater grisons are primarily terrestrial, although they can climb trees and swim well. They are mostly diurnal, and only occasionally active at night. They live alone or in pairs, with home ranges of at least 4.2 km^{2} (1.6 sq mi), and a very low population density, such that they are rarely encountered in the wild. They spend the night sleeping in cavities in hollow logs, beneath tree roots, or in the abandoned burrows of other animals.

Little is known of their diet, although it consists largely of small vertebrates, such as fish, amphibians, birds, and other mammals. While hunting, they move in a zigzag pattern, making short bounds and occasionally stopping to look around with their heads raised and sniffing the air. When moving more cautiously, they press their bodies close to the ground in a movement that has been described as snake-like. They have been reported to respond to threats with a series of grunts that rise in intensity and frequency until they become rapid barks and finally a single loud scream with their teeth bared.

== Biology ==
Like many other mustelids, greater grisons possess anal scent glands that secrete a yellowish or greenish musk. Although not especially noxious in comparison with those of other species, this can be sprayed at attackers or used to mark the grison's territory.

Litters of up to four young are born from March to September, after a gestation period of 39 days. Newborn young weigh less than 50 g (1.8 oz), and are initially blind, although with a short coat of hair already bearing the adult pattern. Their eyes open after two weeks, and they begin to eat solid food at three weeks, reaching the adult size in just four months. They have lived for at least 10 years in captivity.
