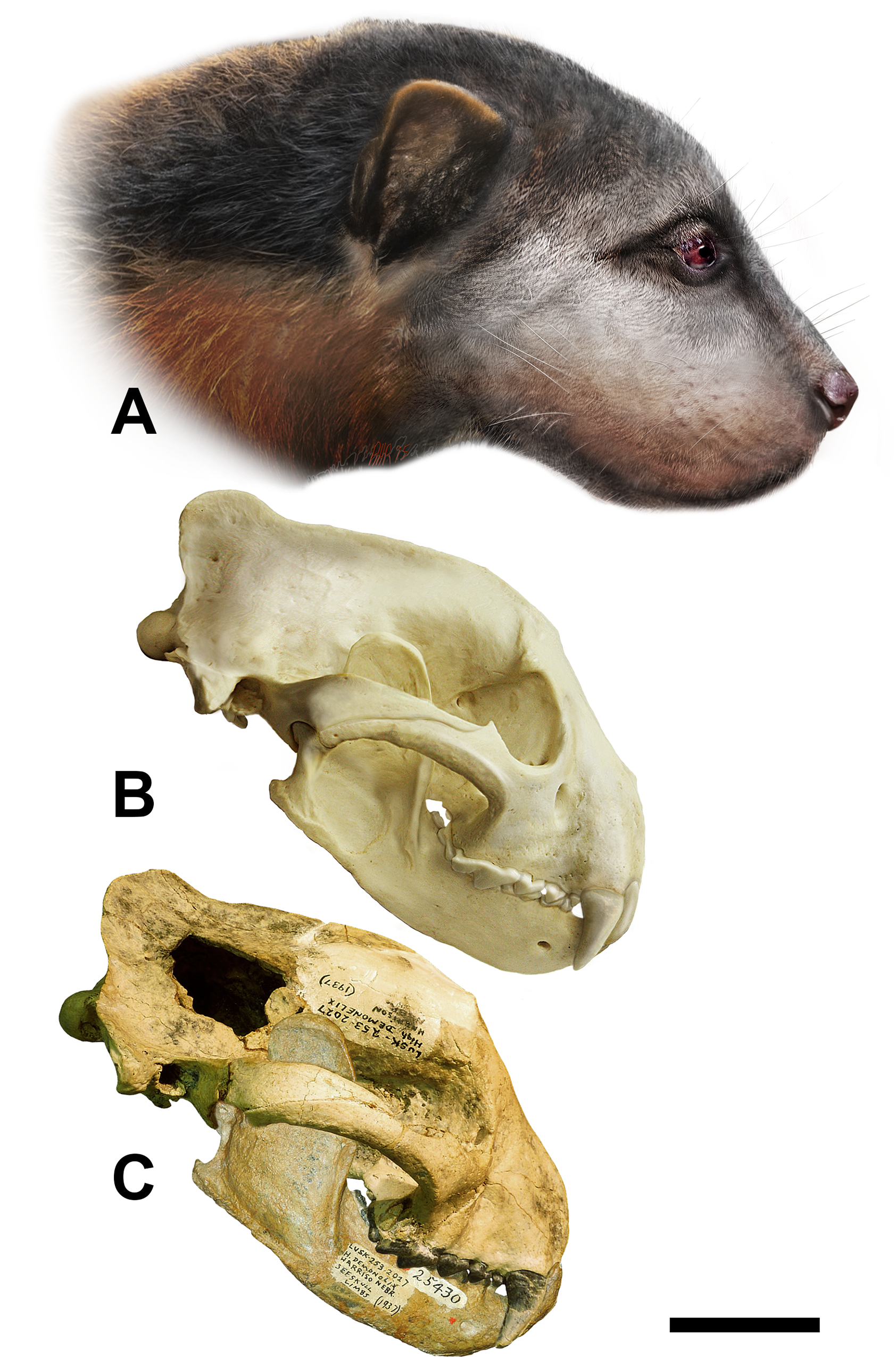
- Life restoration, reconstructed skull, and skull AM 25430 of Megalictis ferox

Scientific classification
- Kingdom: Animalia
- Phylum: Chordata
- Class: Mammalia
- Order: Carnivora
- Family: Mustelidae
- Subfamily: †Oligobuninae

Genera
- Brachypsalis; Floridictis; Megalictis; Oligobunis; Parabrachypsalis; Promartes; Zodiolestes

= Oligobuninae =

Oligobuninae Temporal range: Miocene

Extinct subfamily of carnivores

Oligobuninae is an extinct subfamily of the family Mustelidae known from Miocene deposits in North America.

The subfamily was described by J. A. Baskin in 1998; of the genera that he assigned to this clade, seven are recognized today - Brachypsalis, Megalictis, Oligobunis, Promartes, Zodiolestes, Floridictis and Parabrachypsalis - representing thirteen separate species. Potamotherium, usually considered to belong to Oligobuninae, has been reclassified as a basal pinnipedomorph in the family Semantoridae, which also includes Puijila and Semantor.
