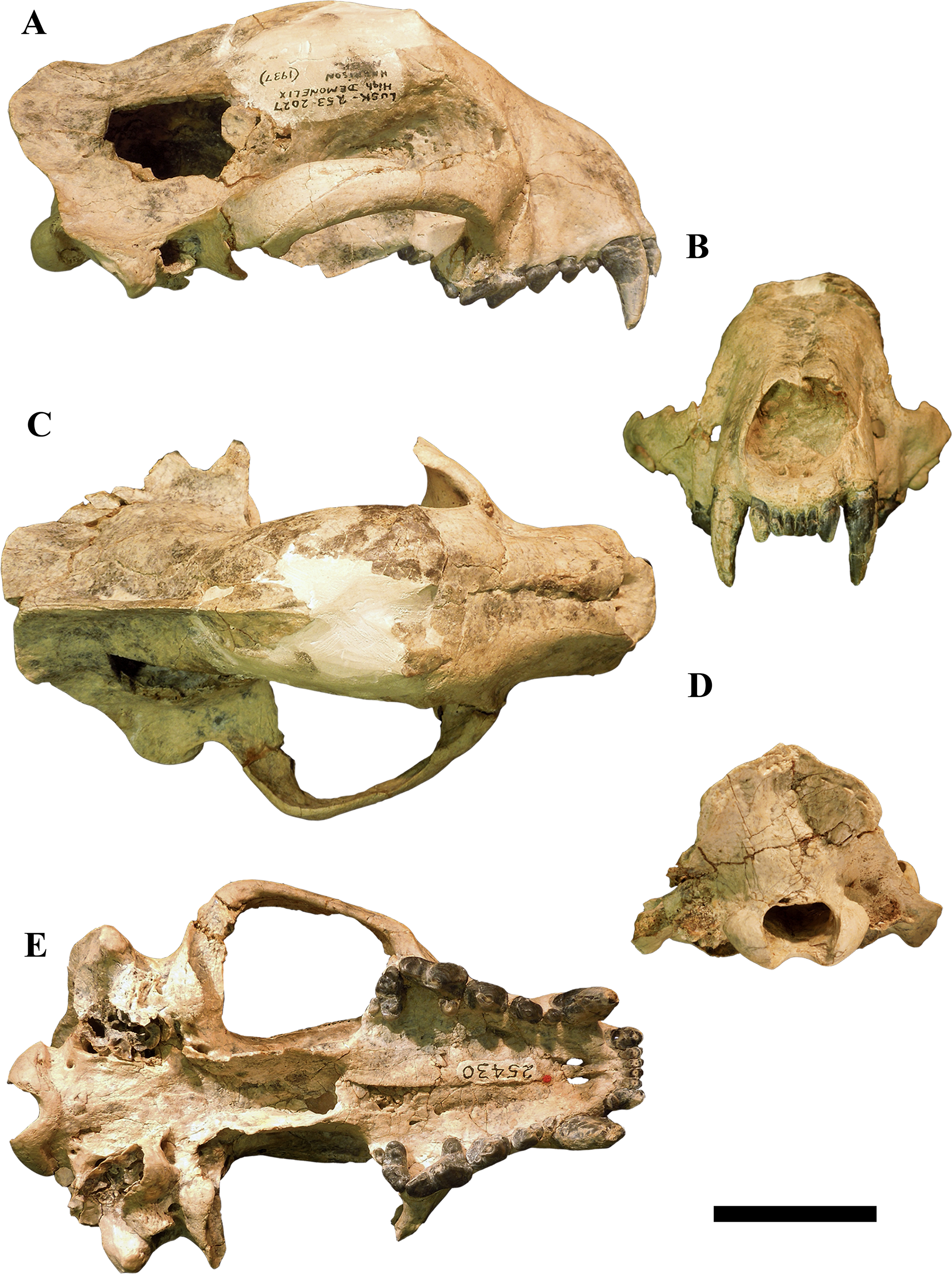
- Skull AM 25430 of M. ferox

Scientific classification
- Kingdom: Animalia
- Phylum: Chordata
- Class: Mammalia
- Order: Carnivora
- Family: Mustelidae
- Subfamily: †Oligobuninae
- Genus: †Megalictis

Species
- M. ferox Matthew, 1907; M. frazieri; M. petersoni

Synonyms
- Aelurocyon; Paroligobunis

= Megalictis =

Megalictis Temporal range: Early Miocene, 22.7–18.5 Ma

Extinct genus of carnivores

Megalictis (meaning "great weasel") is an extinct genus of large predatory mustelids that existed in North America during the "cat gap" from the Late Arikareean (Ar4) in the Miocene epoch. It is thought to have resembled a huge, jaguar-sized ferret, weighing up to 60–100 kilograms (130–220 lb).

== History of discovery ==
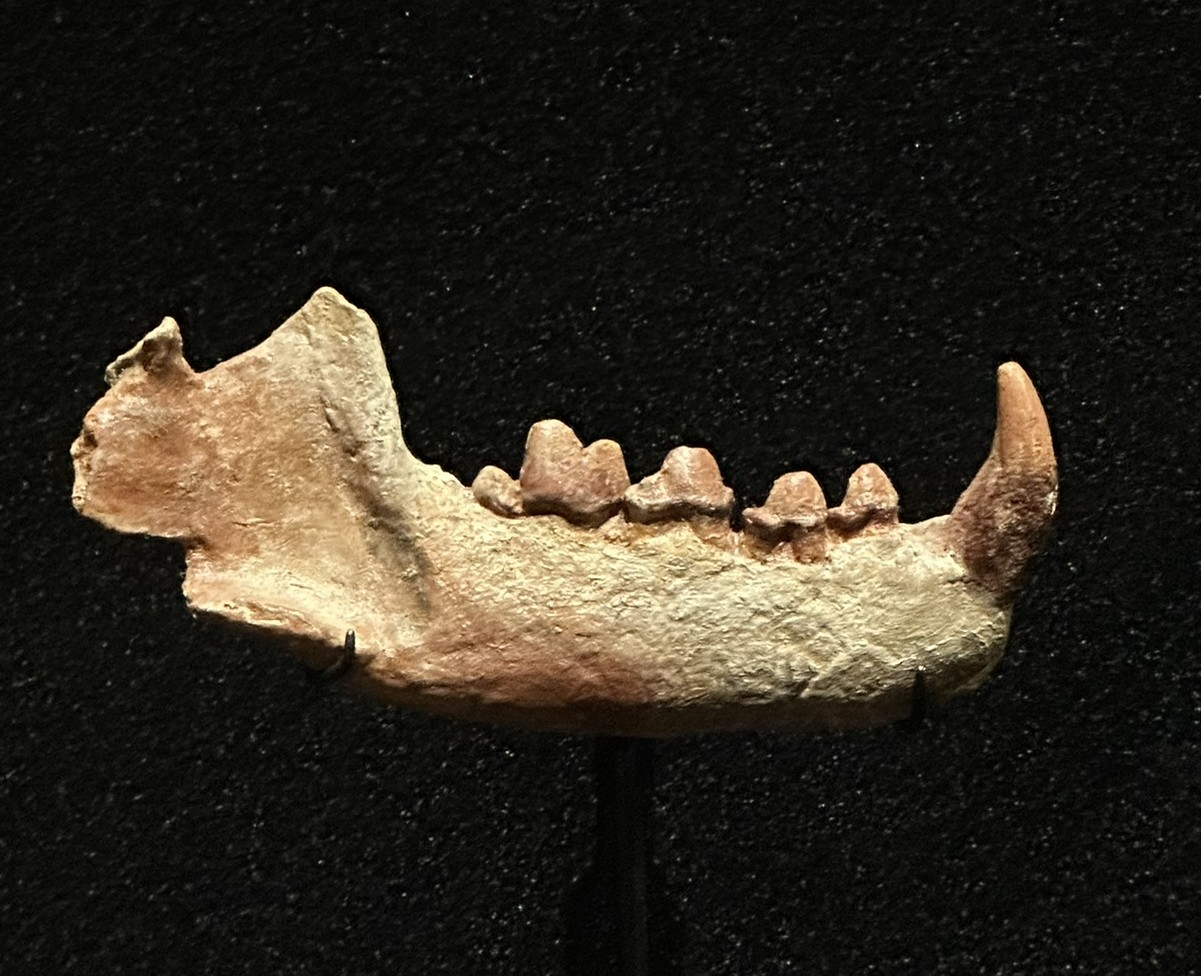
M. frazieri jaw, Florida Museum of Natural History

The genus Megalictis was first described by W. D. Matthew in 1907, and assigned to the family Mustelidae. Two similar genera discovered at the same time, Aelurocyon (Peterson, 1907) and Paroligobunis (Peterson, 1910) were identified as synonymous with Megalictis in 1996 though Paroligobunis was re-established as a separate genus in 1998. P. R. Bjork, in 1970, assigned the genus to the subfamily Mellivorinae, whilst J. A. Baskin reassigned it to Oligobuninae in 1998. Three species have been identified in the genus: M. ferox, M. petersoni, and M. frazieri, whilst two more, Megalictis brevifacies and Megalictis simplicidens, have since been determined to be synonymous with M. ferox. Other synonyms of M. ferox include Aelurocyon brevifacies, Brachypsalis simplicidens and Paroligobunis simplicidens.

Specimens of M. ferox have been found at ten sites in South Dakota, Nebraska and Wyoming, dated to the Harrisonian period - from 24.8 to 20.6 million years ago. The 19 specimens so far identified have a wide range of sizes, which is believed to be evidence of extreme sexual dimorphism, a phenomenon where males and females of the species will grow to different sizes; a 1996 study rejected the possibility of multiple "morphologically uniform" but differently sized species as unlikely. However, later studies identified significant morphological variation in the joints of the forearms, which would not be consistent with sexual dimorphism. Andersson suggests that the identification of all of these as a single species may need revision.

== Description ==
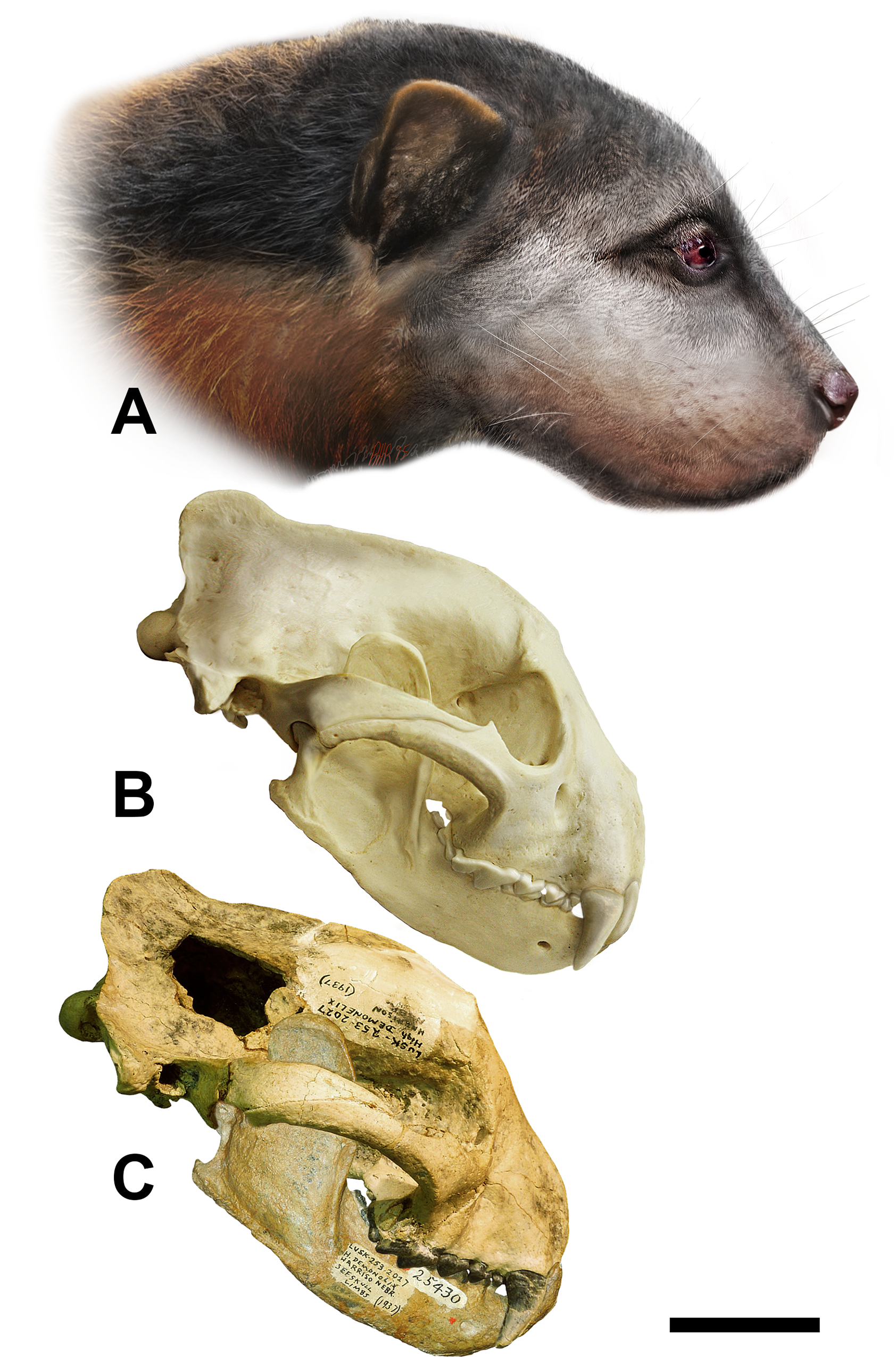
Life restoration, reconstructed skull, and skull AM 25430 of M. ferox

Megalictis was one of the largest terrestrial mustelids ever recorded, surpassing in size other mustelids like Ekorus, Eomellivora, and Plesiogulo. Recovered skulls of Megalictis ferox had similar condylobasal lengths to small modern jaguars, ranging from 189.5 to 241.1 mm (7.46 to 9.49 in) in length, and were almost as wide in mastoid width as those of some black bears, ranging from 106.1 to 136 mm (4.18 to 5.35 in) wide. The enlarged anterior edge of the coronoid process confers a wide gape relative to its short rostral length, suggesting Megalictis possessed a powerful bite force; together with blunt, stout postcanine teeth, Megalictis was well equipped to engage in osteophagy, similar to modern hyenas and wolverines. It has been described as having short stout legs, with short feet and long non-retractible claws, similar to a modern ferret but about twice the size, and noted that "the teeth indicate an animal fully as predaceous as the wolverine, but the skeleton points to more fossorial habits". Research comparing the joints of the forelegs to modern mammalian carnivores suggests that it waited in ambush and grappled with its prey, rather than hunting it down by pursuit like a modern cheetah.
