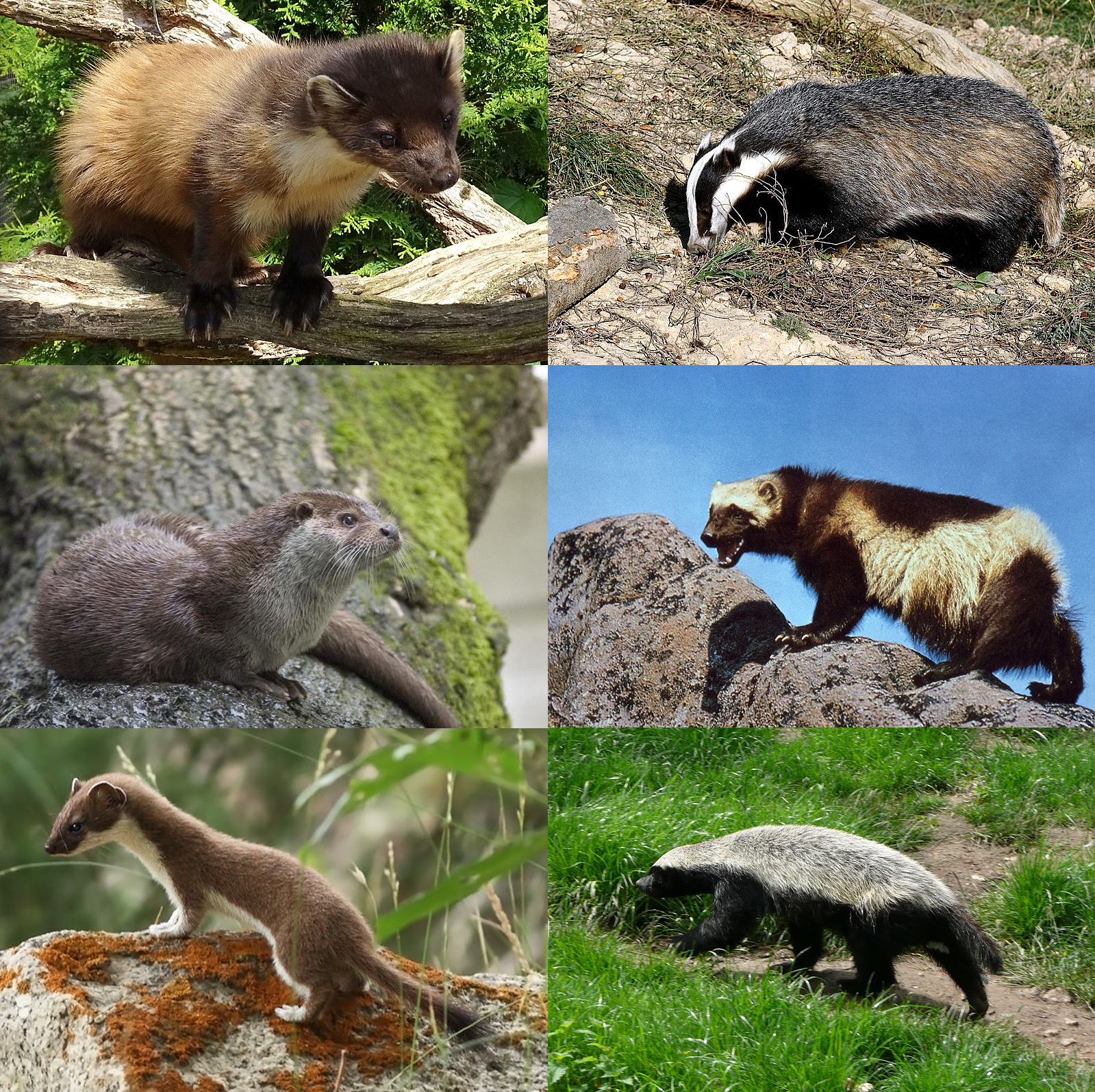

Scientific classification
- Kingdom: Animalia
- Phylum: Chordata
- Class: Mammalia
- Order: Carnivora
- Superfamily: Musteloidea
- Family: Mustelidae; G. Fischer de Waldheim, 1817

Type genus
- Mustela Linnaeus, 1758

Subfamilies
- Guloninae (martens, tayra, fisher, wolverine); Helictidinae (ferret-badgers); Ictonychinae (grisons, African polecats); Lutrinae (otters); Melinae (Eurasian badgers); Mellivorinae (honey badger); Mustelinae (weasels); Taxidiinae (American badger); †Oligobuninae
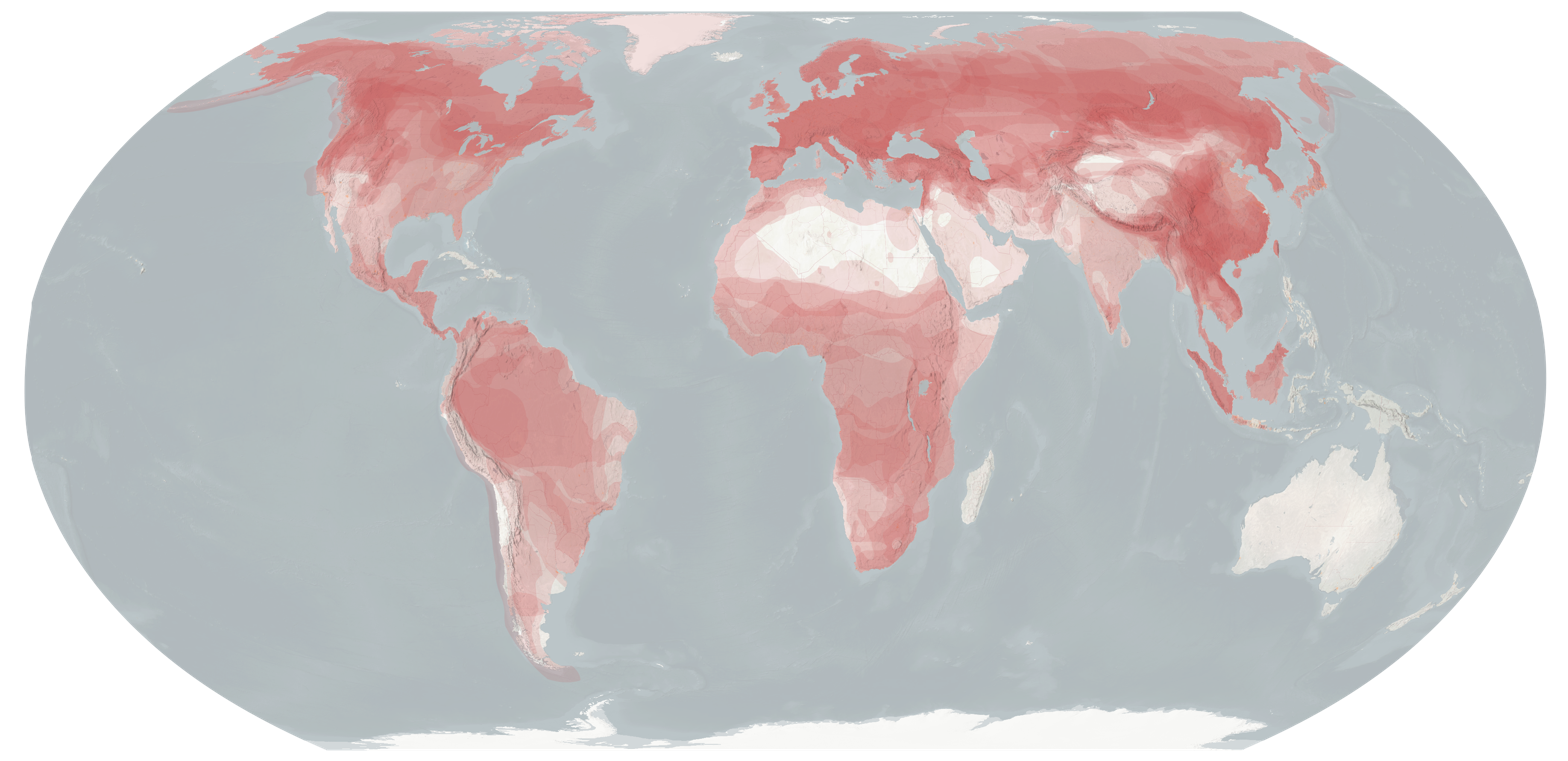
- The native distribution and density of extant mustelid species.

= Mustelidae =

Mustelidae Temporal range: Oligocene–Recent

Family of mammals

The Mustelidae (/mʌˈstɛlɪdiː/; from Latin mustela, weasel) are a diverse family of carnivoran mammals, including weasels, badgers, otters, sea otters, polecats, martens, grisons and wolverines. Otherwise known as mustelids (/ˈmʌstɪlɪdz/), they form the largest family in the suborder Caniformia of the order Carnivora with between 66 to 70 species in nine subfamilies.

== Variety ==
Mustelids vary greatly in size and behaviour. The smaller variants of the least weasel can be under 20 cm (8 in) in length, while the giant otter of Amazonian South America can measure up to 1.7 m (5 ft 7 in) and sea otters can exceed 45 kg (99 lb) in weight. Wolverines can crush bones as thick as the femur of a moose to get at the marrow, and have been seen attempting to drive bears away from their kills. The sea otter uses rocks to break open shellfish to eat. Martens are largely arboreal, while European badgers dig extensive tunnel networks, called setts. Only one mustelid has been domesticated: the ferret.

Tayra are also kept as pets (although they require a Dangerous Wild Animals licence in the UK), or as working animals for hunting or vermin control. Others have been important in the fur trade—the mink is often raised for its fur.

Mustelidae is one of the oldest and most species-rich families in the order Carnivora. Mustelid-like forms appeared about 40 million years ago (Mya), roughly coinciding with the appearance of rodents. The common ancestor of modern mustelids appeared about 18 Mya.

== Characteristics ==
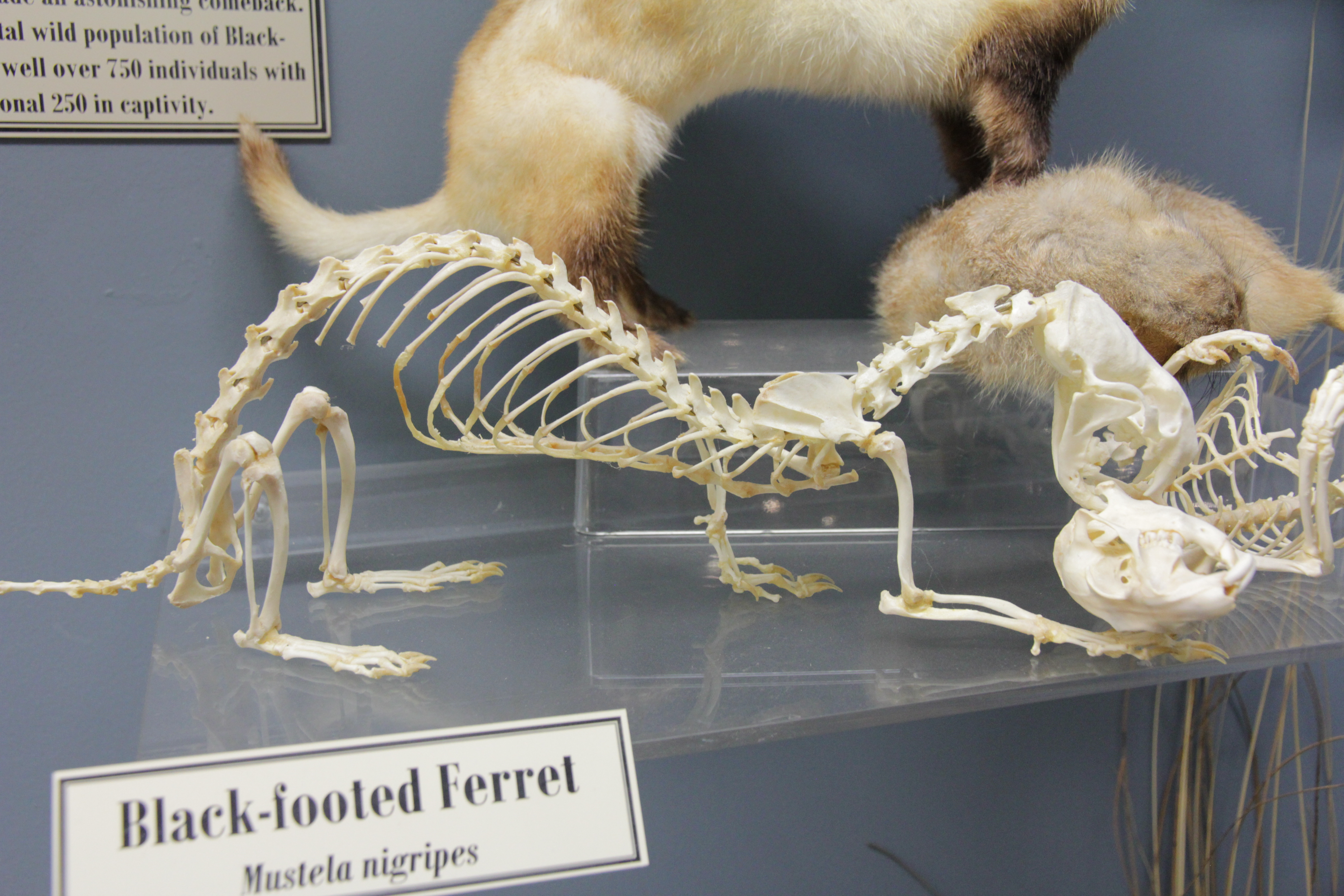
Skeleton of a black-footed ferret (Mustela nigripes) on display at the Museum of Osteology

Within a large range of variation, the mustelids exhibit some common characteristics. They are typically small animals with elongated bodies, short legs, short skulls, short, round ears, and thick fur.

Mustelids' long, slender body structure is adapted to three main lifestyles: terrestrial; arboreal; and aquatic/semi-aquatic. They exhibit digitigrade or plantigrade locomotion, with five toes on each foot, enabling them to move in different ways (i.e., digging, climbing, swimming).

Most mustelids are solitary, nocturnal animals, and are active year-round. Their dense fur, often serving as natural camouflage, undergoes seasonal changes to help them adjust to varying environmental conditions.

With the exception of the sea otter they have anal scent glands that produce a strong-smelling secretion the animals use for sexual signalling and marking territory.

=== Reproduction ===
Mustelids exhibit sexual dimorphism, with males being larger than females, but degree varies between species as well as geographically within species. Male mustelids have a bifurcated penis and baculum. Most mustelid reproduction involves embryonic diapause. The embryo does not immediately implant in the uterus, but remains dormant for some time. No development takes place as long as the embryo remains unattached to the uterine lining. As a result, the normal gestation period is extended, sometimes up to a year. This allows the young to be born under favourable environmental conditions. Reproduction has a large energy cost, so it is to a female's benefit to have available food and mild weather. The young are more likely to survive if birth occurs after previous offspring have been weaned.

=== Diet ===
Mustelids are predominantly carnivorous, although some eat vegetable matter at times. While not all mustelids share an identical dentition, they all possess teeth adapted for eating flesh, including the presence of shearing carnassials. One characteristic trait is a meat-shearing upper-back molar that is rotated 90°, towards the inside of the mouth.

With variation between species, the most common dental formula is 3.1.3.13.1.3.2, for a total of 34 teeth.

== Ecology ==
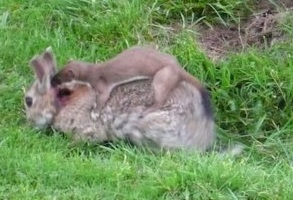
Stoat killing a rabbit

The fisher, tayra, and martens are partially arboreal, while badgers are fossorial. A number of mustelids have aquatic lifestyles, ranging from semiaquatic minks and river otters to the fully aquatic sea otter, which is one of the few nonprimate mammals known to use tools while foraging. It uses "anvil" stones to crack open the shellfish that form a significant part of its diet. It is a "keystone species", keeping its prey populations in balance so some do not outcompete the others and destroy the kelp in which they live.

The black-footed ferret is entirely dependent on another keystone species, the prairie dog. A family of four ferrets eats 250 prairie dogs in a year; this requires a stable population of prairie dogs from an area of some 500 acres (200 ha).

== Animals of similar appearance ==
Skunks were previously included as a subfamily of the mustelids, but DNA research placed them in their own separate family (Mephitidae).

Mongooses bear a striking resemblance to many mustelids, but belong to a distinctly different suborder—the Feliformia (all those carnivores sharing more recent origins with the cats) and not the Caniformia (those sharing more recent origins with the dogs). Because mongooses and mustelids occupy similar ecological niches, convergent evolution has led to similarity in form and behaviour.

== Human uses ==
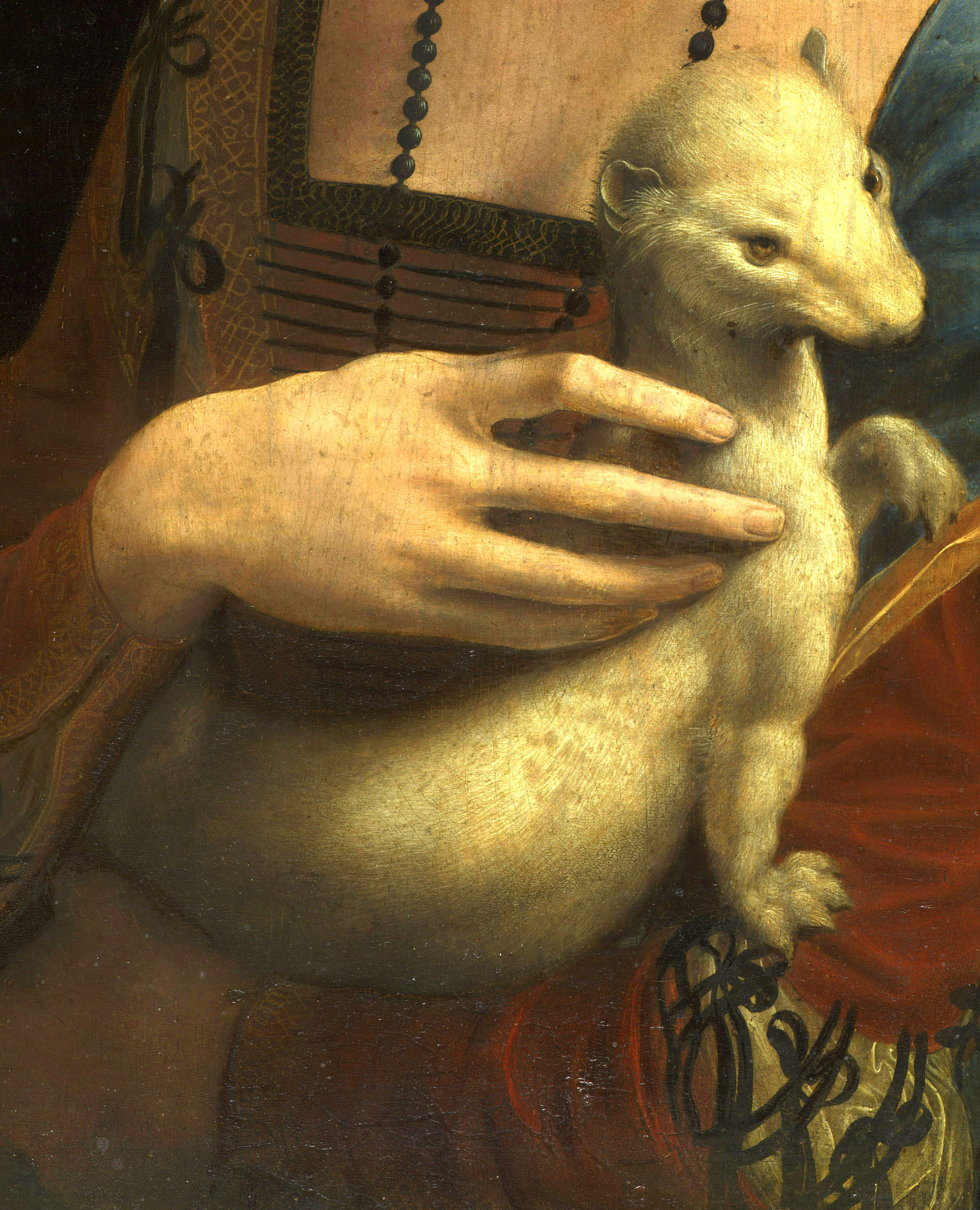
Detail from Leonardo da Vinci's Lady with an Ermine (c. 1489–1490)

Several mustelids, including the mink, the sable (a type of marten), and the stoat (ermine), possess furs that are considered beautiful and valuable, so have been hunted since prehistoric times. From the early Middle Ages, the trade in furs was of great economic importance for northern and eastern European nations with large native populations of fur-bearing mustelids, and was a major economic impetus behind Russian expansion into Siberia and French and English expansion in North America. In recent centuries fur farming, notably of mink, has also become widespread and provides the majority of the fur brought to market.

One species, the sea mink (Neogale macrodon) of New England and Canada, was driven to extinction by fur trappers. Its appearance and habits are almost unknown today because no complete specimens can be found and no systematic contemporary studies were conducted.

The sea otter, which has the densest fur of any animal, narrowly escaped the fate of the sea mink. The discovery of large populations in the North Pacific was the major economic driving force behind Russian expansion into Kamchatka, the Aleutian Islands, and Alaska, as well as a cause for conflict with Japan and foreign hunters in the Kuril Islands. Together with widespread hunting in California and British Columbia, the species was brought to the brink of extinction until an international moratorium came into effect in 1911.

Today, some mustelids are threatened for other reasons. Sea otters are vulnerable to oil spills and the indirect effects of overfishing; the black-footed ferret, a relative of the European polecat, suffers from the loss of American prairie; and wolverine populations are slowly declining because of habitat destruction and persecution. The rare European mink (Mustela lutreola) is one of the most endangered mustelid species.

The ferret, a domesticated form of the European polecat, is a fairly common pet.

== Evolution and systematics ==
Mustelidae is a subfamily in Musteloidea, a superfamily of mammals that is united by shared skull and teeth characteristics. Mustelids are believed to have separated from their next closest related family, Procyonidae, around 29 million years ago.

The oldest known mustelid from North America is Corumictis wolsani from the early and late Oligocene (early and late Arikareean, Ar1–Ar3) of Oregon. Middle Oligocene Mustelictis from Europe might also be a mustelid.

Other early fossils of the mustelids were dated at the end of the Oligocene to the beginning of the Miocene. Which of these forms are Mustelidae ancestors and which should be considered the first mustelids is unclear.

The fossil record indicates that mustelids appeared in the late Oligocene period (33 Mya) in Eurasia and migrated to every continent except Antarctica and Australia (all the continents that were connected during or since the early Miocene). They reached the Americas via the Bering land bridge.

=== Classification ===
The 69 recent mustelids (67 extant species) are classified into eight subfamilies in 22 genera:

Subfamily Taxidiinae
- Genus Taxidea
  - American badger, T. taxus

Subfamily Mellivorinae

- Genus Mellivora
  - Honey badger, M. capensis

Subfamily Melinae

- Genus Arctonyx
  - Northern hog badger, A. albogularis
  - Greater hog badger, A. collaris
  - Sumatran hog badger, A. hoevenii
- Genus Meles
  - Japanese badger, M. anakuma
  - Asian badger, M. leucurus
  - European badger, M. meles
  - Caucasian badger, M. canescens

Subfamily Helictidinae

- Genus Melogale
  - Vietnam ferret-badger, M. cucphuongensis
  - Bornean ferret-badger, M. everetti
  - Chinese ferret-badger, M. moschata
  - Javan ferret-badger, M. orientalis
  - Burmese ferret-badger, M. personata
  - Formosan ferret-badger, M. subaurantiaca

Subfamily Guloninae

- Genus Eira
  - Tayra, E. barbara
- Genus Gulo
  - Wolverine, G. gulo
- Genus Martes
  - American marten, M. americana
  - Pacific marten, M. caurina
  - Yellow-throated marten, M. flavigula
  - Beech marten, M. foina
  - Nilgiri marten, M. gwatkinsii
  - European pine marten, M. martes
  - Japanese marten, M. melampus
  - Sable, M. zibellina
- Genus Pekania
  - Fisher, P. pennanti

Subfamily Ictonychinae

- Genus Galictis
  - Lesser grison, G. cuja
  - Greater grison, G. vittata
- Genus Ictonyx
  - Striped polecat, I. striatus
- Genus Lyncodon
  - Patagonian weasel, L. patagonicus
- Genus Poecilictis
  - Saharan striped polecat, P. libyca
- Genus Poecilogale
  - African striped weasel, P. albinucha
- Genus Vormela
  - Marbled polecat, V. peregusna

Subfamily Lutrinae (otters)

- Genus Aonyx
  - African clawless otter, A. capensis
  - Asian small-clawed otter, A. cinerea
  - Congo clawless otter, A. congicus
- Genus Enhydra
  - Sea otter, E. lutris
- Genus Lontra
  - North American river otter, L. canadensis
  - Marine otter, L. felina
  - Neotropical otter, L. longicaudis
  - Southern river otter, L. provocax
- Genus Lutra
  - Eurasian otter, L. lutra
  - Hairy-nosed otter, L. sumatrana
  - † Japanese otter. L. nippon
- Genus Hydrictis
  - Spotted-necked otter, H. maculicollis
- Genus Lutrogale
  - Smooth-coated otter, L. perspicillata
- Genus Pteronura
  - Giant otter, P. brasiliensis

Subfamily Mustelinae (weasels, ferrets, and mink)

- Genus Mustela
  - Mountain weasel, M. altaica
  - M. mopbie
  - Stoat (Beringian ermine), M. erminea
  - Steppe polecat, M. eversmannii
  - Domestic ferret, M. furo
  - Haida ermine, M. haidarum
  - Japanese weasel, M. itatsi
  - Yellow-bellied weasel, M. kathiah
  - European mink, M. lutreola
  - Indonesian mountain weasel, M. lutreolina
  - Black-footed ferret, M. nigripes
  - Least weasel, M. nivalis
  - Malayan weasel, M. nudipes
  - European polecat, M. putorius
  - American ermine, M. richardsonii
  - Siberian weasel, M. sibirica
  - Back-striped weasel, M. strigidorsa
- Genus Neogale
  - Amazon weasel, N. africana
  - Colombian weasel, N. felipei
  - Long-tailed weasel, N. frenata
  - American mink, N. vison
  - †Sea mink, N. macrodon

Fossil mustelids Extinct genera of the family Mustelidae include:

- Archaeomeles
- Brachypsalis
- Chamitataxus
- Corumictis
- Cyrnaonyx
- Dehmictis
- Ekorus
- Enhydriodon
- Eomellivora
- Galanthisictis
- Hoplictis
- Megalictis
- Oligobunis
- Oaxacagale
- Plesictis
- Sthenictis
- Sonitictis
- Teruelictis
- Trochictis
- Zdanskyictis

== Gallery ==
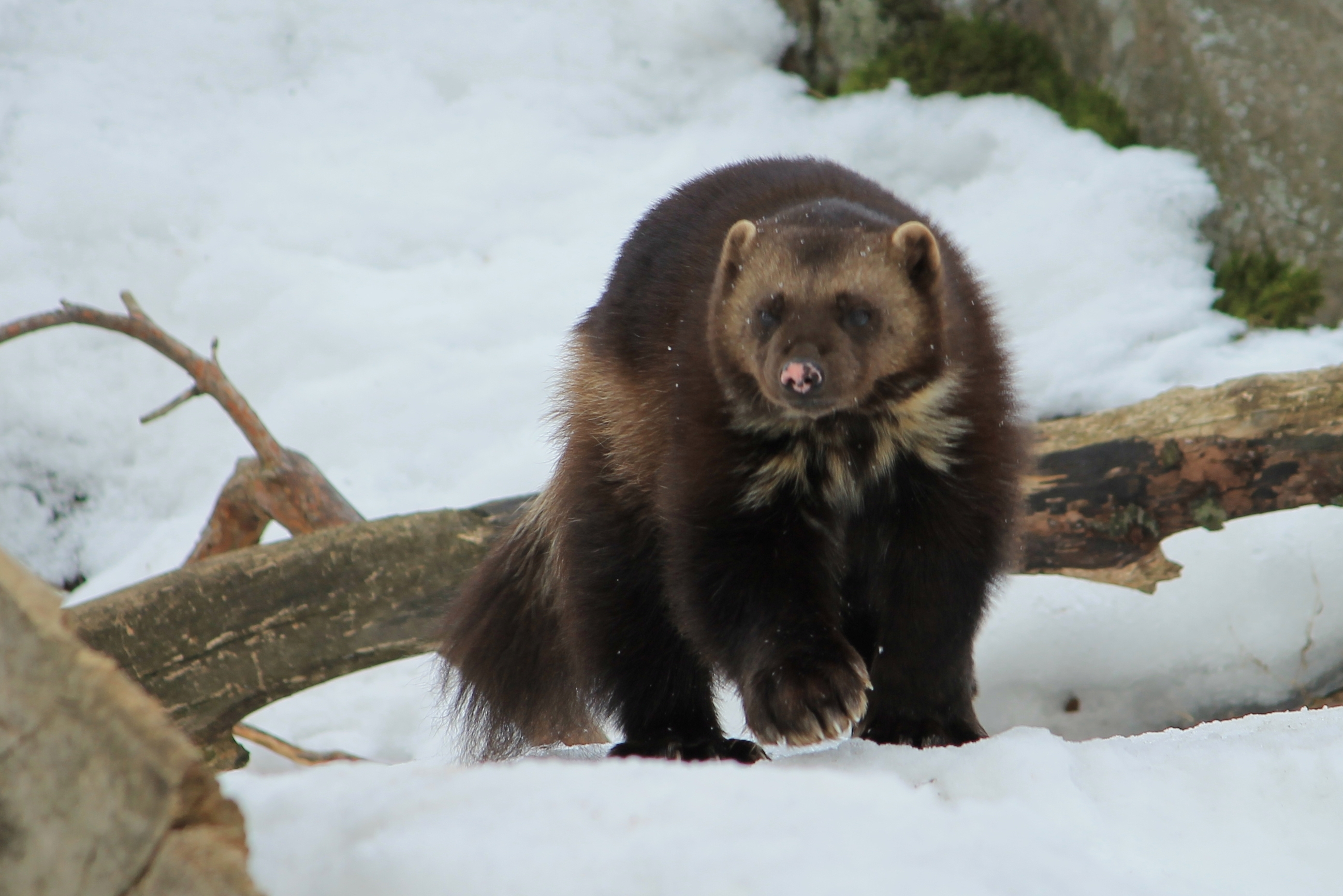
Female wolverine (Gulo gulo).

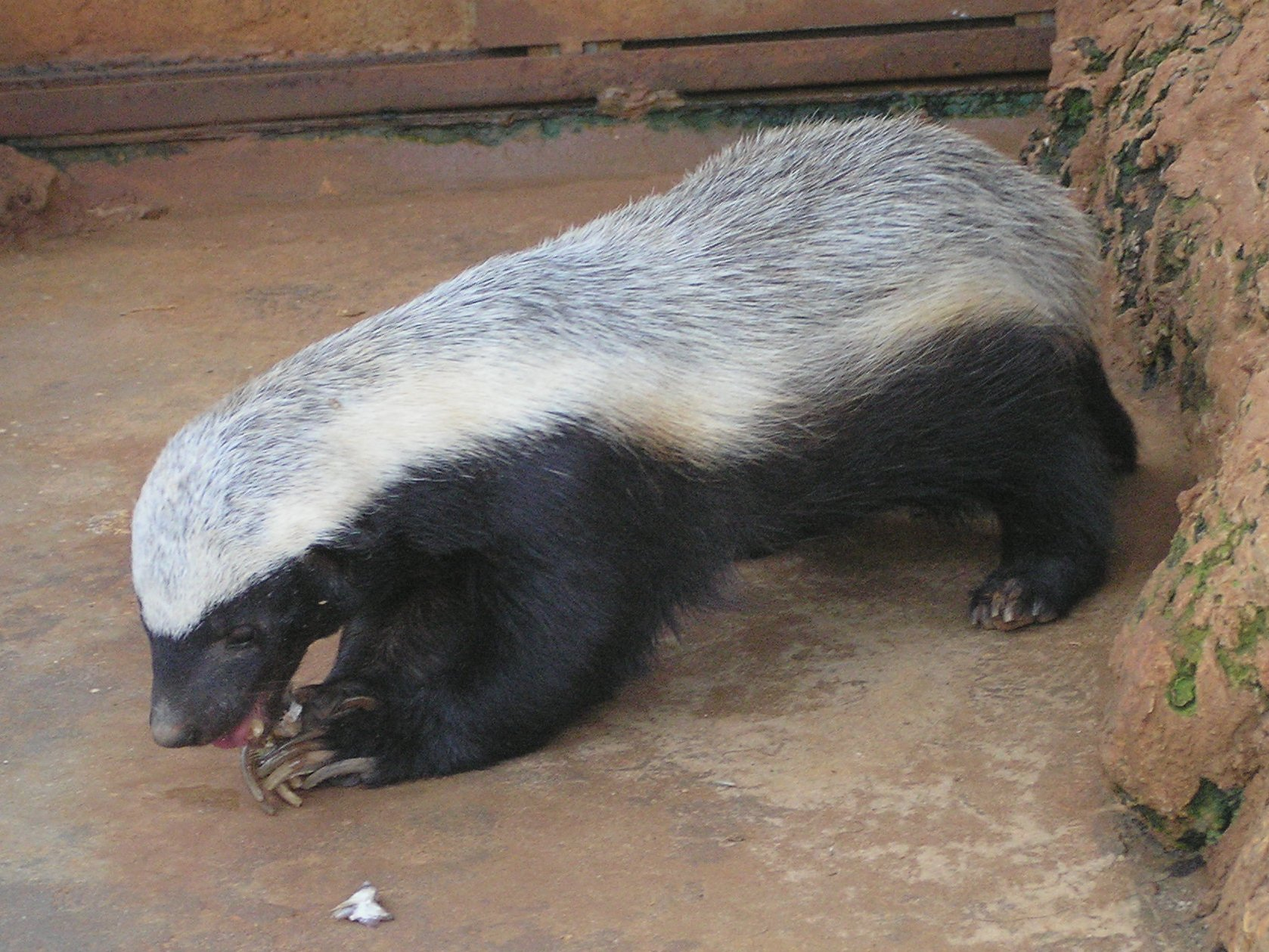
Honey badger, (Mellivora capensis)

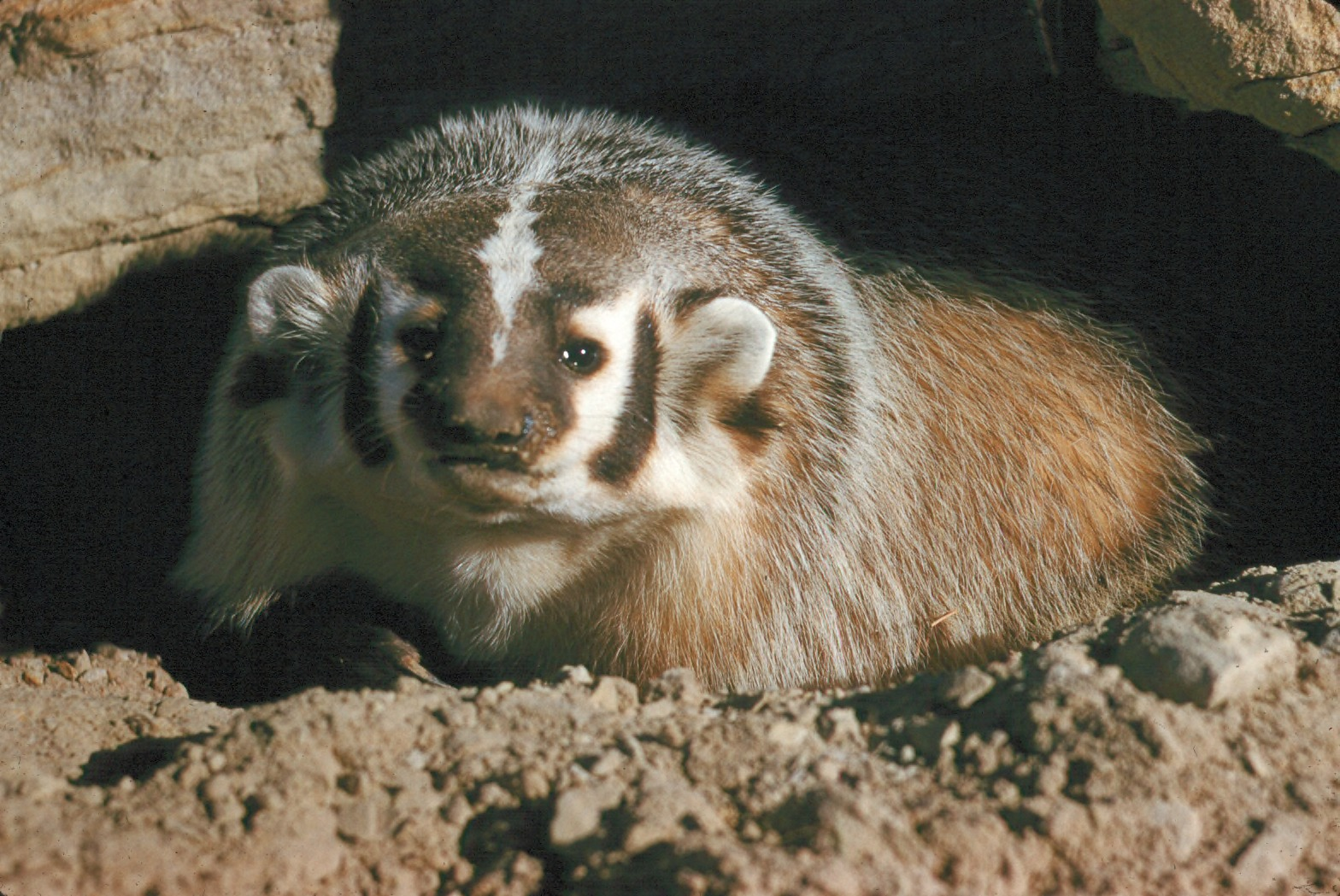
American badger, (Taxidea taxus)

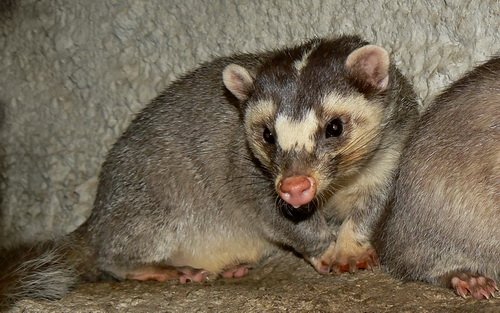
Chinese ferret badger, (Melogale moschata)

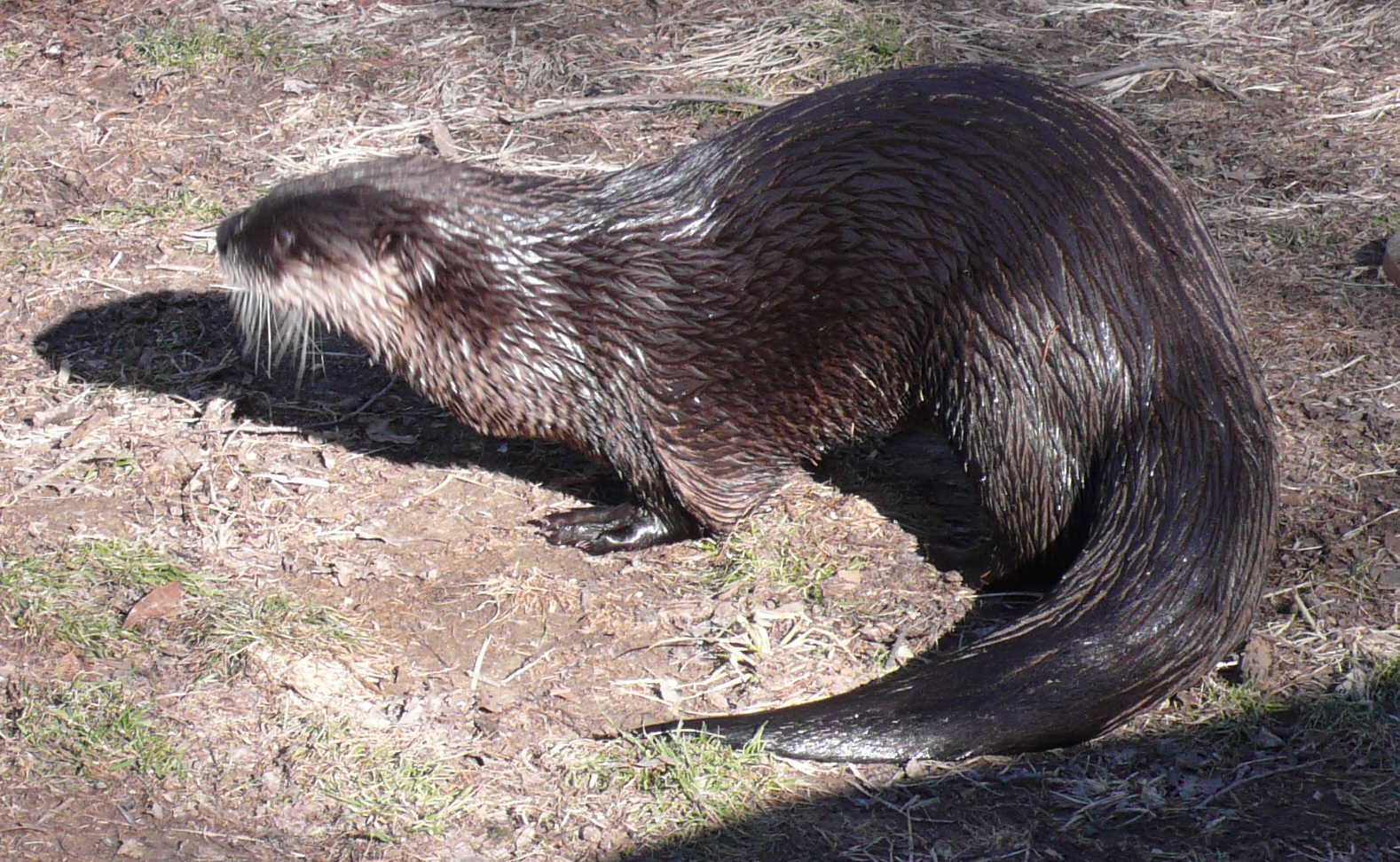
North American river otter, (Lontra canadensis)

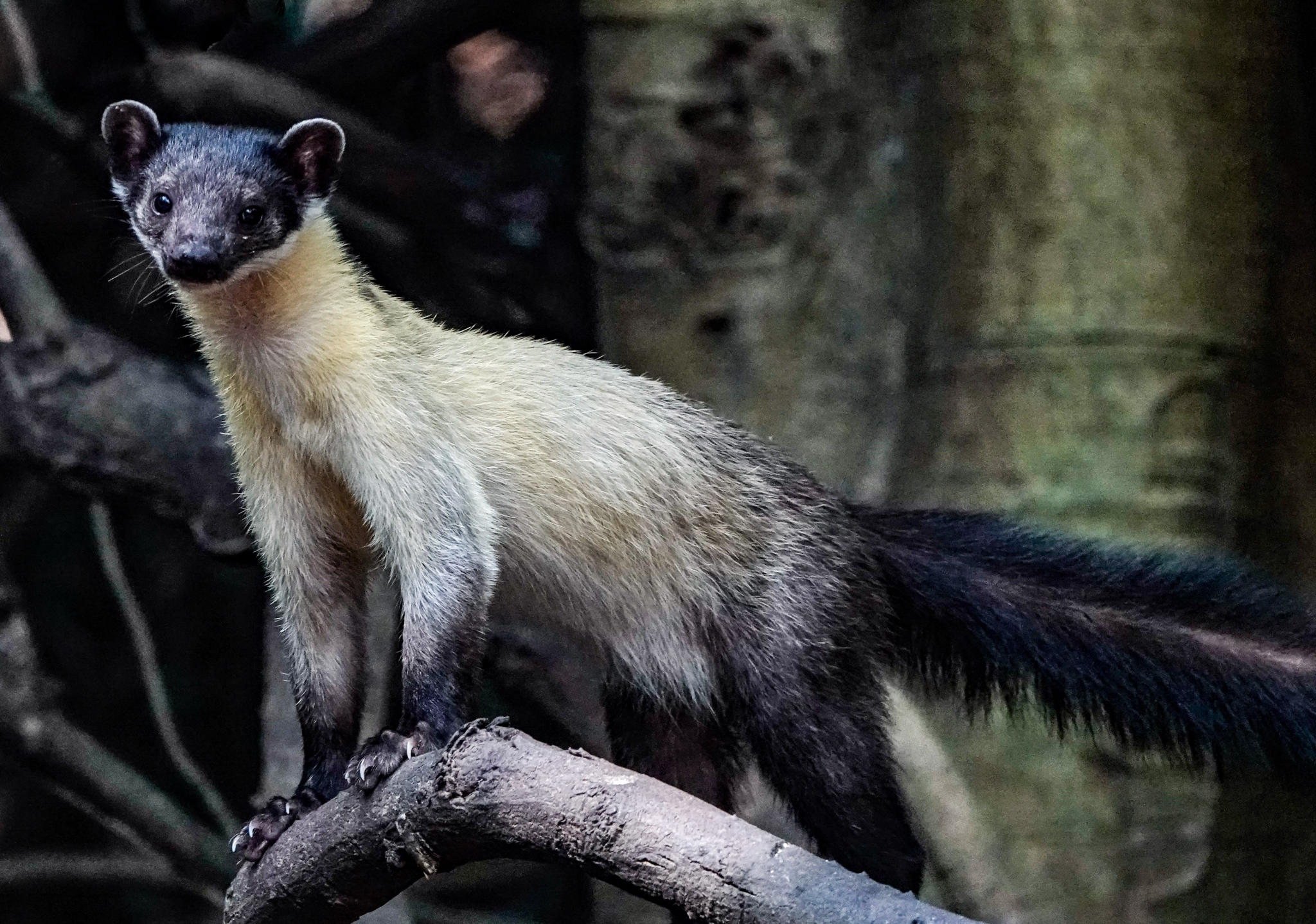
Yellow-throated marten, (Martes flavigula)

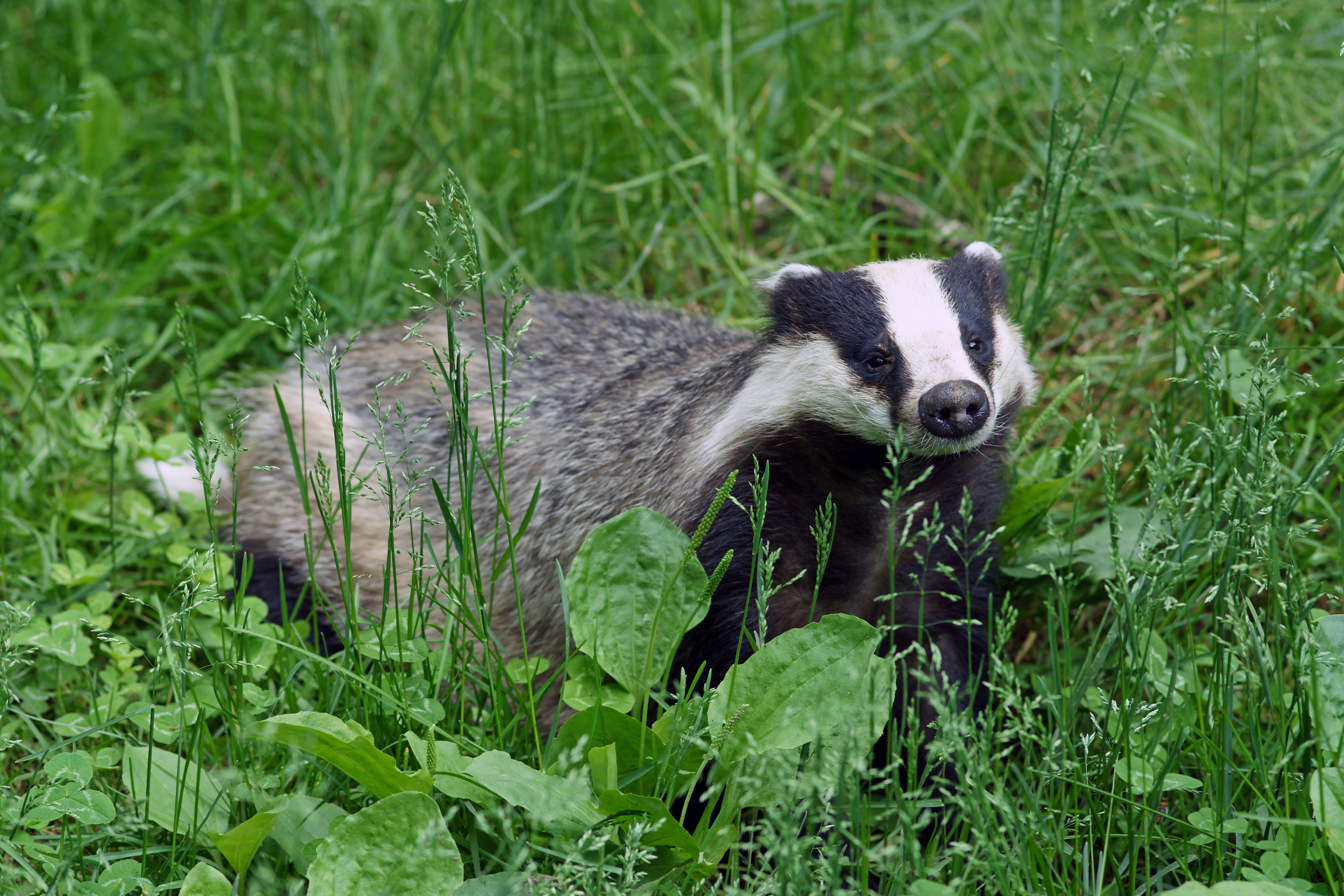
European badger, (Meles meles)

=== Phylogeny ===
Multigene phylogenies constructed by Koepfli et al. (2008) and Law et al. (2018) found that Mustelidae comprises eight living subfamilies. The early mustelids appear to have undergone two rapid bursts of diversification in Eurasia, with the resulting species spreading to other continents only later.

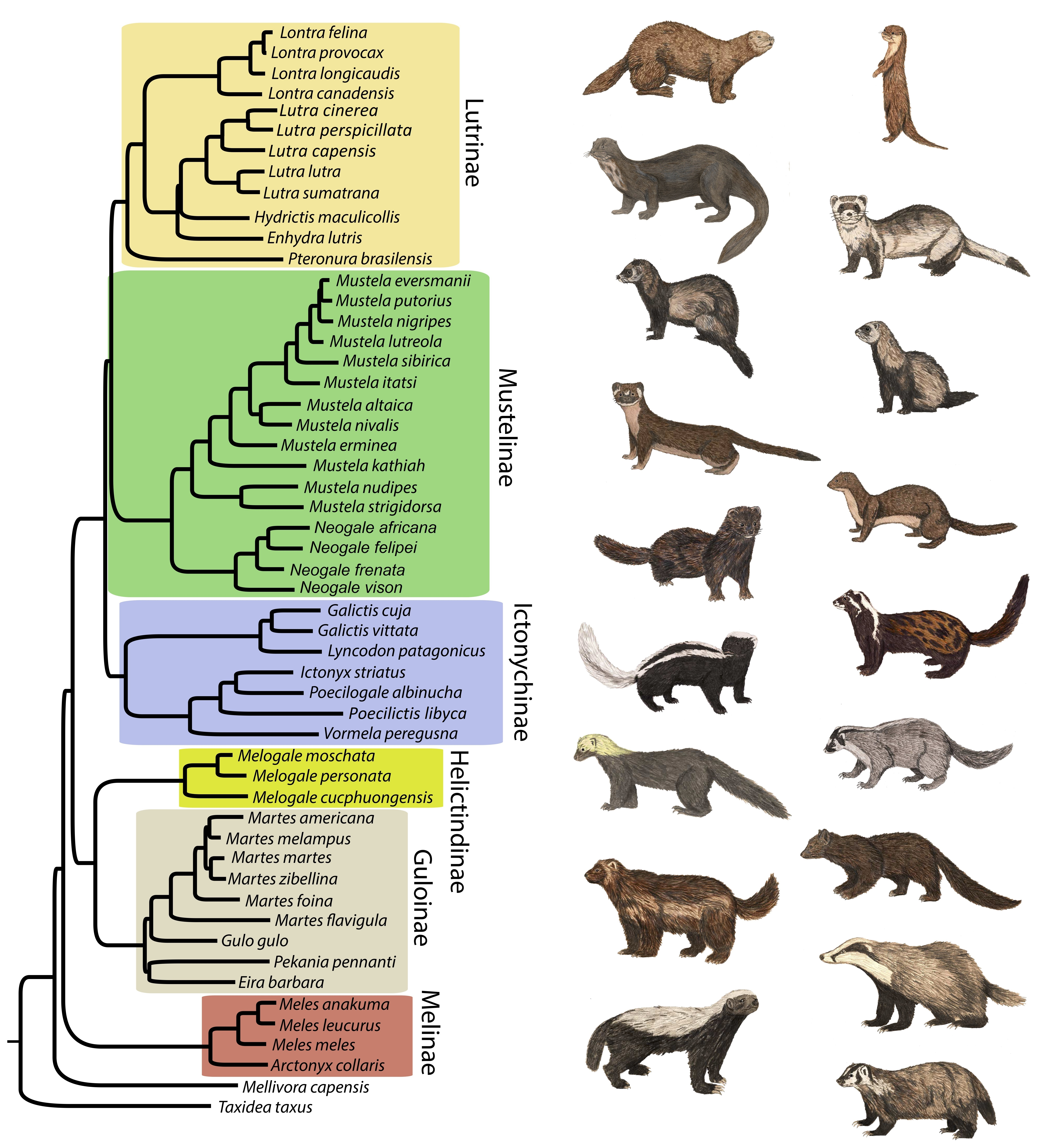
Phylogenetic tree of Mustelidae. Contains 53 of the 79 putative mustelid species.

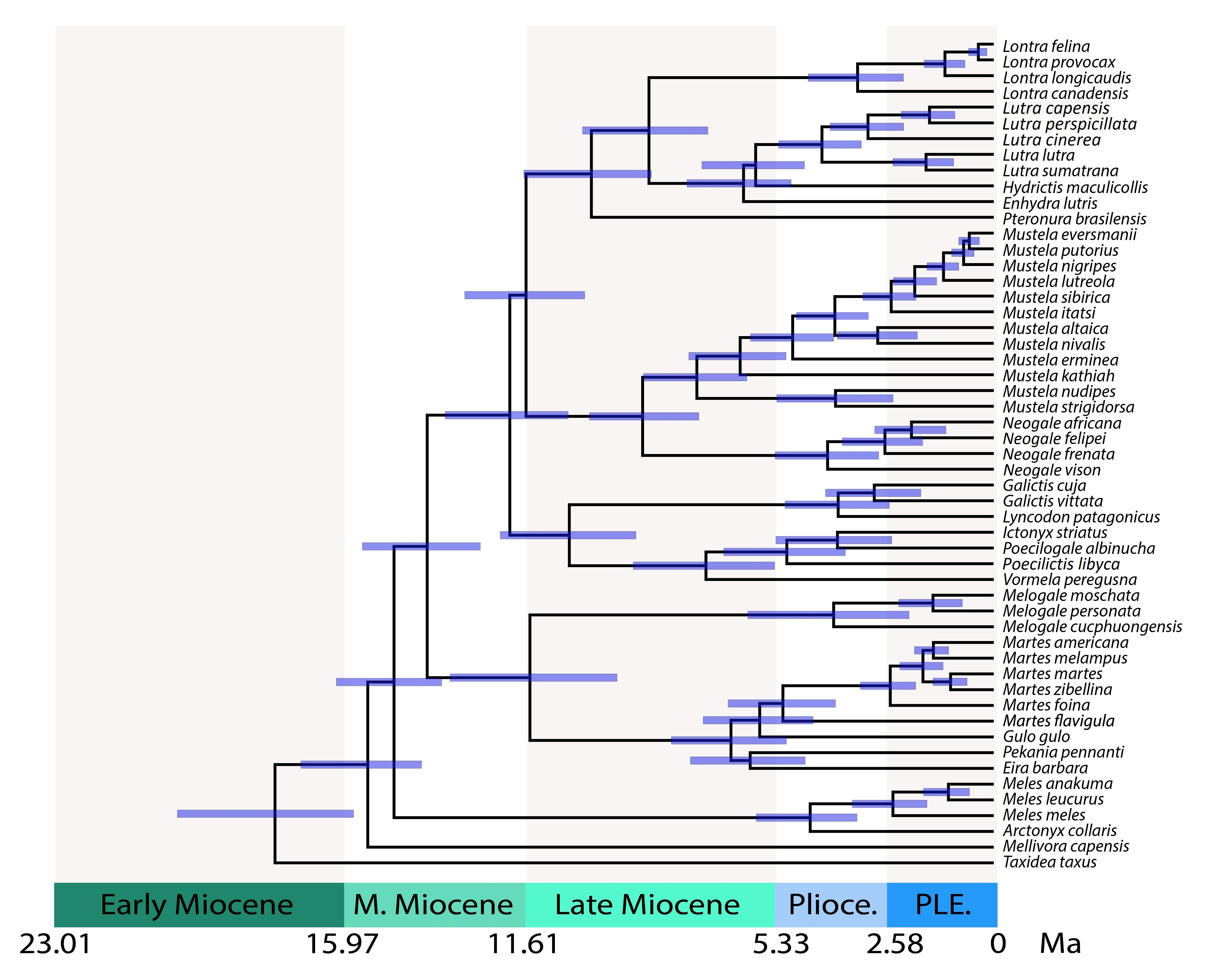
Time-calibrated tree of Mustelidae showing divergence times between lineages. Split times include: 28.8 million years (Ma) for mustelids vs. procyonids; 17.8 Ma for Taxidiinae; 15.5 Ma for Mellivorinae; 14.8 Ma for Melinae; 14.0 Ma for Guloninae + Helictidinae; 11.5 Ma for Guloninae vs. Helictidinae; 12.0 Ma for Ictonychinae; 11.6 Ma for Lutrinae vs. Mustelinae.

Mustelid species diversity is often attributed to an adaptive radiation coinciding with the mid-Miocene climate transition. Contrary to expectations, Law et al. (2018) found no evidence for rapid bursts of lineage diversification at the origin of the Mustelidae, and further analyses of lineage diversification rates using molecular and fossil-based methods did not find associations between rates of lineage diversification and mid-Miocene climate transition as previously hypothesized.

== Bibliography ==
- Macdonald, David; Barrett, Pricilla (1993). "Order Carnivora - Family Mustelidae". Collins Field Guide Mammals of Britain & Europe. London: HarperCollinsPublishers. pp. 109–131. ISBN 9780002197793.
- Whitaker, John O. (12 October 1980). The Audubon Society Field Guide to North American Mammals. Alfred A. Knopf. p. 745. ISBN 978-0-394-50762-0.
