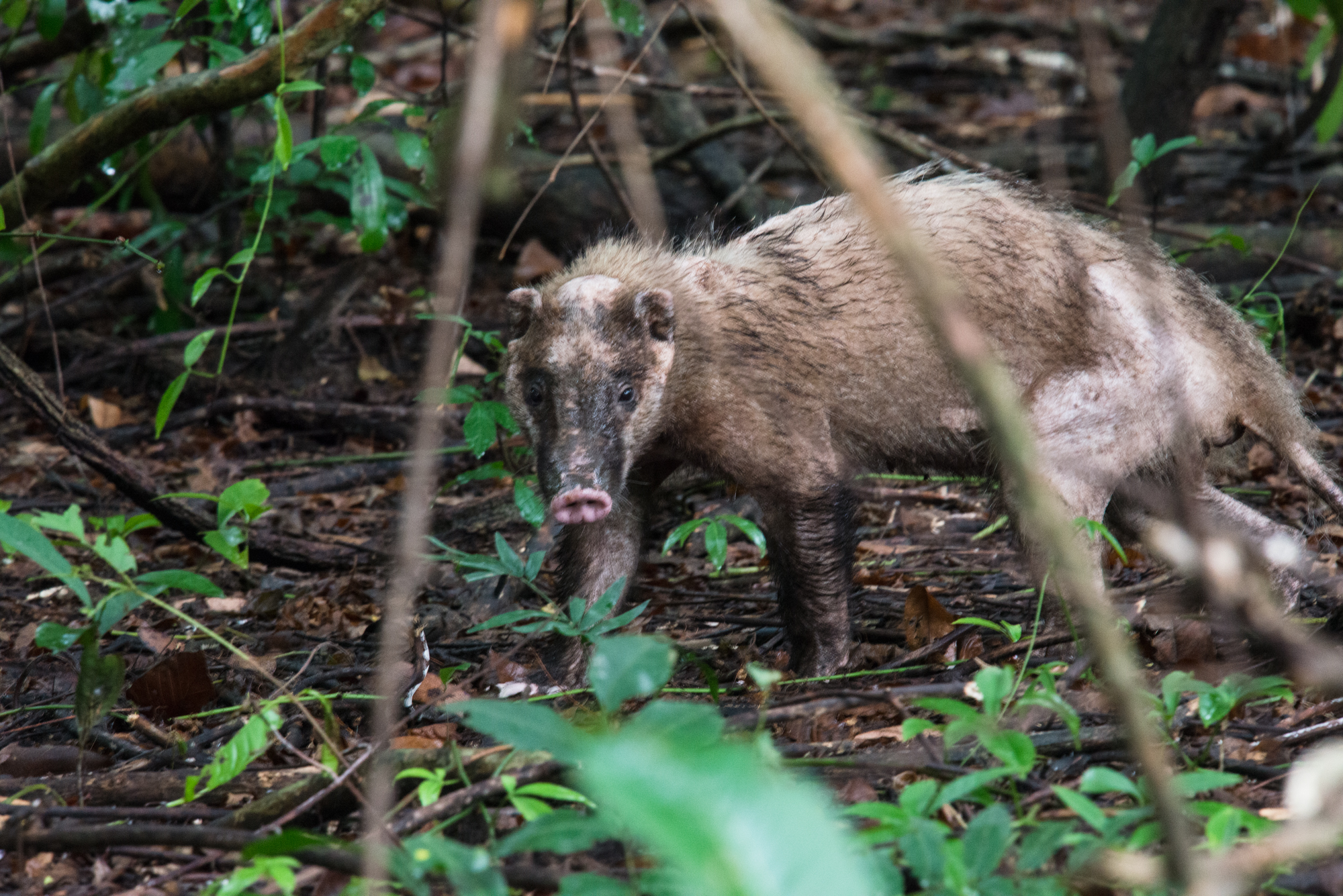
- Greater hog badger in Huai Kha Khaeng Wildlife Sanctuary, Thailand

Conservation status
- Vulnerable (IUCN 3.1)

Scientific classification
- Kingdom: Animalia
- Phylum: Chordata
- Class: Mammalia
- Infraclass: Placentalia
- Order: Carnivora
- Family: Mustelidae
- Genus: Arctonyx
- Species: A. collaris

Binomial name
- Arctonyx collaris Cuvier, 1825
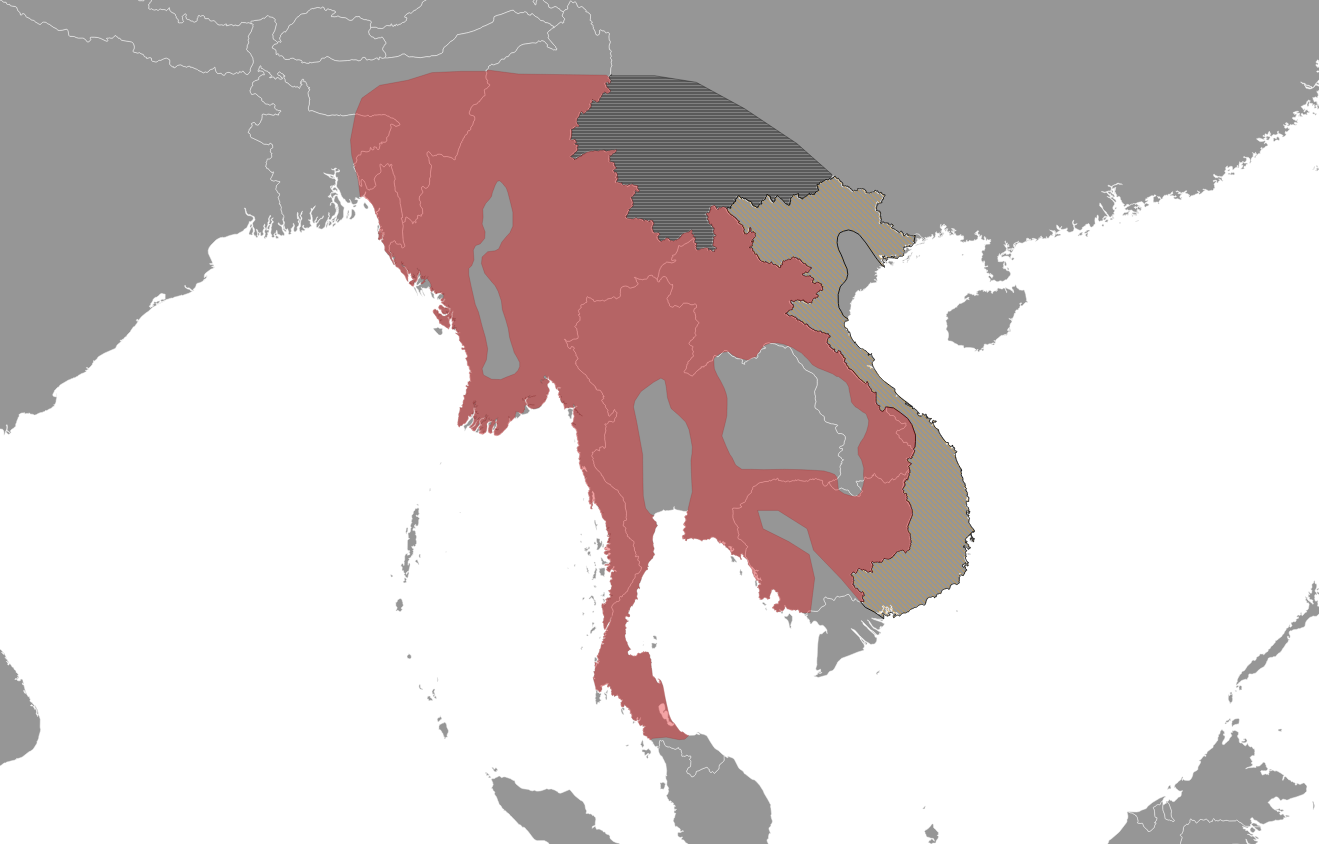

= Greater hog badger =

Species of carnivore

The greater hog badger (Arctonyx collaris) is a very large terrestrial mustelid native to Southeast Asia. It is listed as Vulnerable in the IUCN Red List of Threatened Species because the global population is thought to be declining due to high levels of poaching.

== Taxonomy ==
It was formerly thought to be the only species in the genus Arctonyx, displaying heavy variation throughout its wide range, leading it to be classified as having many subspecies. However, a 2008 study found that Arctonyx should be split into three species. The following subspecies were formerly recognized, but are now thought to be conspecific with little distinction between one another:

- Greater hog badger A. c. collaris (Cuvier, 1825) – lives in the Eastern Himalayas;
- Indochinese hog badger A. c. dictator (Thomas, 1910) – lives in southern Thailand and Indochina;
- Burmese hog badger A. c. consul (Pocock, 1940) – occurs from Assam to Myanmar.

== Description ==
The greater hog badger has medium-length brown hair, a stocky body, white throat, two black stripes on an elongated white snout, with a pink, pig-like nose. The snout-to-rump length is 65–104 cm (26–41 in), the tail measures 19–29 cm (7.5–11.4 in) and the body weight is 7–14 kg (15–31 lb).

With weights regularly reported between 8.4 to 12 kg (19 to 26 lb), it is one of the world's largest terrestrial extant mustelids (by average body mass). It is perhaps only second or third to the wolverine, rivaling the European badger; However, hog badgers are not known to rival the weights of the European badger during autumn hyperphagia.

A hog badger's appearance generally resembles the European badger, but having a pronounced pig-like snout, and with larger claws on the front feet. Its tail has long white hairs, and its front feet have white claws.

== Distribution and habitat ==
The greater hog badger is considered fairly common in Thailand and most of mainland Southeast Asia, living in tropical evergreen forests and grasslands. They are also to be found in the Terai of the Indian subcontinent; from the Yamuna River east, through the states of Haryana, Uttarakhand, Uttar Pradesh, Bihar, Assam and West Bengal. The range also encompasses areas of lower Himalayan foothills in parts of Bangladesh, Bhutan, and Nepal, in addition to the Brahmaputra River basin. Its distribution in Myanmar is considered patchy.

== Behaviour and ecology ==
The hog badger is active by day and not very wary of humans. Analysis of numerous camera trap pictures from Myanmar show no peak activity at either day or night.

The hog badger is omnivorous; its diet consists of fruits, roots and small animals. A study conducted in Laos found that the native clouded leopards eat a large proportion of greater hog badgers, accounting for 28% of their diet.
