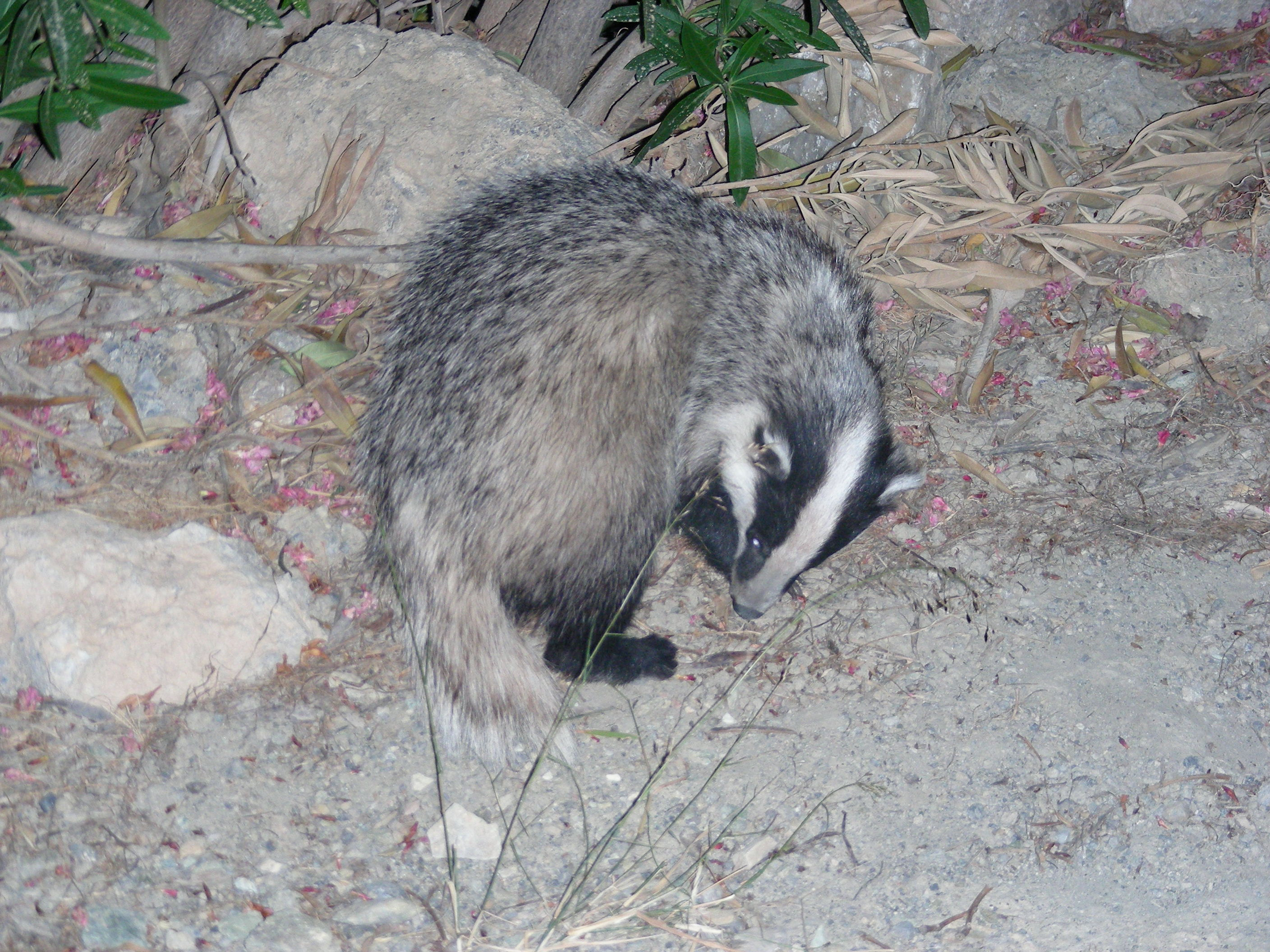

Scientific classification
- Domain: Eukaryota
- Kingdom: Animalia
- Phylum: Chordata
- Class: Mammalia
- Order: Carnivora
- Family: Mustelidae
- Genus: Meles
- Species: M. canescens

Binomial name
- Meles canescens Blanford, 1875
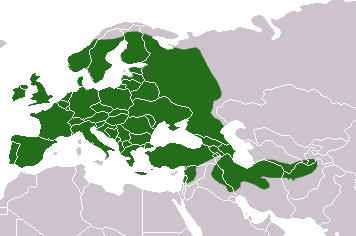
- European badger range (also includes Caucasian badger range)

= Caucasian badger =

Species of mammal native to Western Asia

The Caucasian badger (Meles canescens) or Southwest Asian badger is a species of badger native to Western Asia and some islands in the Mediterranean Sea.

== Taxonomy ==
The Caucasian badger was formerly thought to be a subspecies of the European badger (M. meles), along with the other subspecies also classified within it. However, a 2013 study found significant genetic divergence between both species. It is thought that both diverged during the Pleistocene, between 2.37 million years ago to 450,000 years ago. The American Society of Mammalogists recognises it as a distinct species.

== Description ==
This species is smaller than the European badger, with a dirty-greyish back and brown highlights; its head is identical to the European badger, though with weaker crests; its upper molars are elongated in a similar way as the Asian badger's. Its fur can be distinguished from the Asian and Japanese badgers by its facial mask, which resembles that of the European badger.

== Distribution ==
The Caucasian badger ranges from Anatolia north to the Caucasus Mountains, south to the Levant and west-central Iran, and east through the Tian Shan mountains. It also occurs on the Mediterranean islands of Crete and Rhodes. The boundary of its range to the European badger is thought to be in the North Caucasus, but a clear boundary has not been defined, as both are known to be sympatric in some places, and potential hybrids have been identified. It was also recorded in Afghanistan.

== Taxonomy ==
Of the eight European badger subspecies recognized in 2005, four are now thought to belong to the Caucasian badger.

Subspecies	Source	Description	Distribution
Transcaucasian badger (M. c. canescens)	Blanford, 1875 minor (Satunin, 1905) ponticus (Blackler, 1916)	A small subspecies with a dirty-greyish back and brown highlights; its head is identical to the common badger, though with weaker crests; its upper molars are elongated in a similar way as the Asian badger's.	Transcaucasia, the Kopet Dag, Turkmenistan, Iran, Afghanistan and Asia Minor
Cretan badger (M. c. arcalus)	Miller, 1907		Crete
Rhodes badger (M. c. rhodius)	Festa, 1914		Rhodes
Fergana badger (M. c. severzovi)	Heptner, 1940 bokharensis (Petrov,1953)	A small subspecies with a relatively pure, silvery-grey back with no yellow sheen. The head stripes are wide and occupy the whole ear. Its skull exhibits several features which are transitory between the Asian and European badger.	Right tributaries of the Panj and upper Amu Darya rivers, the Pamir-Alay system, the Fergana Valley and adjoining mountains
