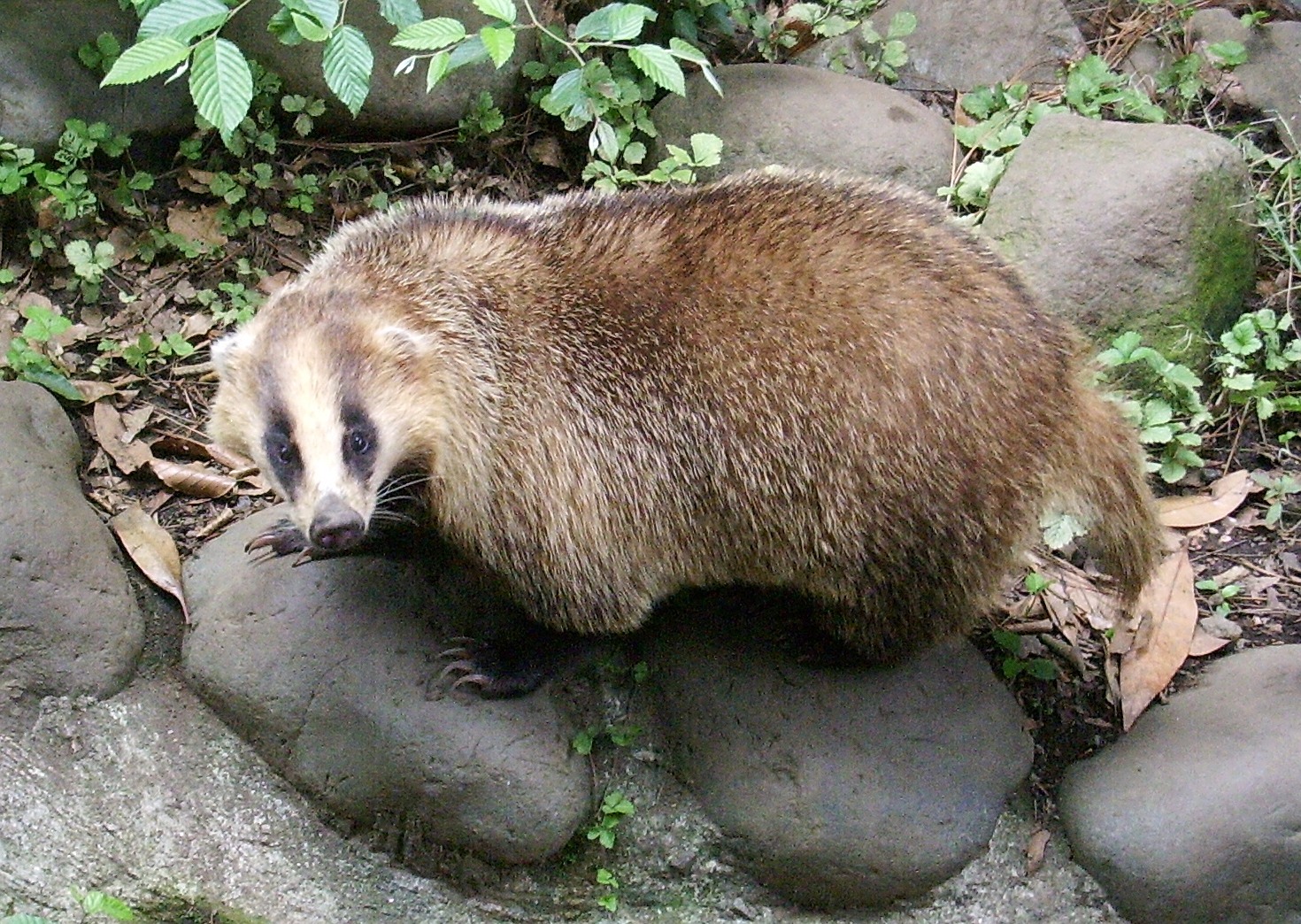
- At Inokashira Park Zoo, Tokyo

Conservation status
- Least Concern (IUCN 3.1)

Scientific classification
- Kingdom: Animalia
- Phylum: Chordata
- Class: Mammalia
- Order: Carnivora
- Family: Mustelidae
- Genus: Meles
- Species: M. anakuma

Binomial name
- Meles anakuma Temminck, 1844
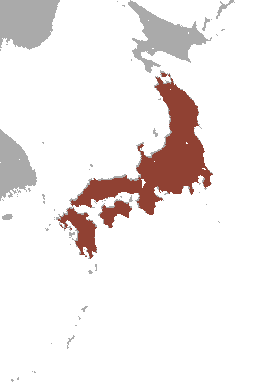
- Japanese badger range

= Japanese badger =

Species of carnivore

The Japanese badger (Meles anakuma) is a species of carnivoran of the family Mustelidae, the weasels and their kin. Endemic to Japan, it is found on Honshu, Kyushu, Shikoku, and Shōdoshima. It is assigned to the genus Meles with its close relatives, the European (M. meles), Caucasian (M. canescens) and Asian (M. leucurus) badgers. In Japan, it is called by the name anaguma (穴熊, 貛) meaning "hole-bear", or mujina (むじな, 狢, 貉).

== Description ==
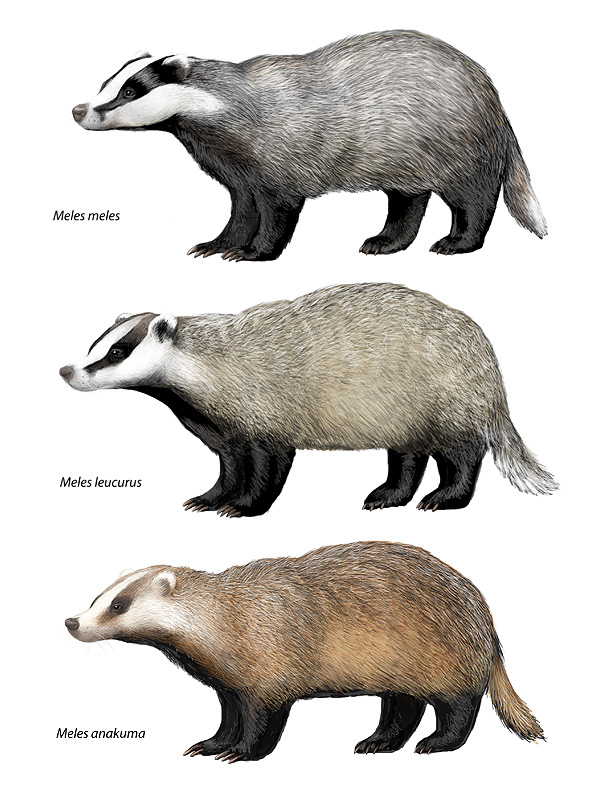
Comparative illustration of European badger (top), Asian badger (centre) and Japanese badger (bottom)

At an average length of 79 cm (31 in) in males and 72 cm (28 in) in females, the Japanese badger is generally smaller and less sexually dimorphic (except in the size of the canine teeth) than its European counterparts. Tail length is between 14 and 20 cm (5.5 and 7.9 in). This species is similar or mildly larger than the Asian badger. Adults usually weigh from 3.8 to 11 kg (8.4 to 24.3 lb). The average weight of female Japanese badgers in one study from the Tokyo area was found to be 6.6 kg (15 lb) while that of males was 7.76 kg (17.1 lb). In Yamaguchi Prefecture, the average spring weight of female and male Japanese badgers was 4.4 kg (9.7 lb) and 5.7 kg (13 lb) respectively. The torso is blunt and limbs are short. The front feet are equipped with powerful digging claws. The claws on the hind feet are smaller. The outer coat has long gray-brown hair. Ventral hair is short and black. The face has characteristic black-white stripes that are not as distinct as in the European badger. The dark color is concentrated around the eyes. The skull is smaller than the European badger.

== Origin ==
The absence of badgers from Hokkaido, and the presence of related M. leucurus in Korea, suggest that the ancestral badgers reached Japan from the southwest via Korea. Genetic studies indicate that there are substantial differences between Japanese and Asian badgers, which were formerly considered conspecific, and that the Japanese badger is genetically more homogenous.

== Habits ==
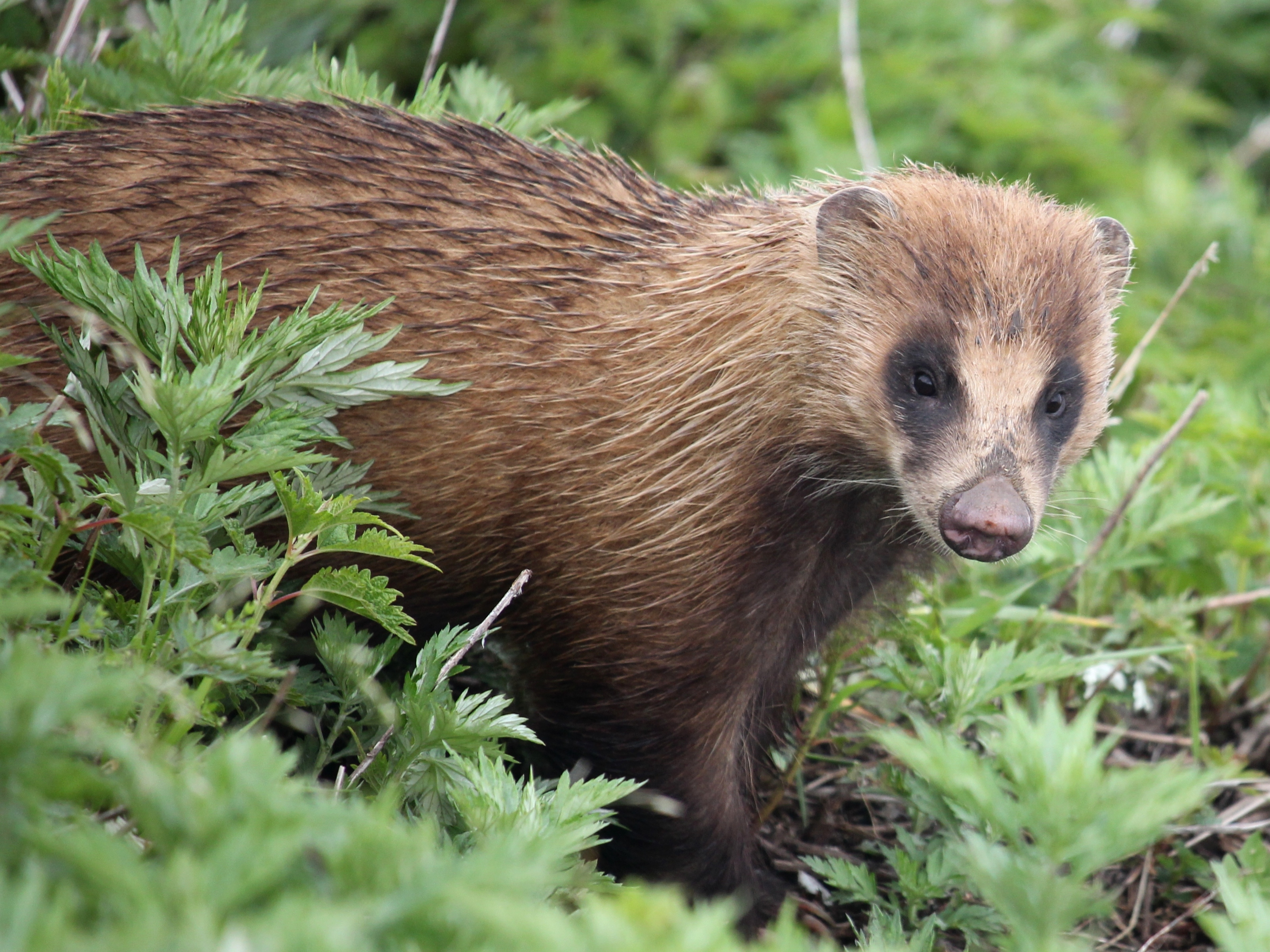
On Mount Ibuki

Like other members of Meles, the Japanese badger is nocturnal and hibernates during the coldest months of the year. Beginning at 2 years of age, females mate and give birth to litters of two or three cubs in the spring (March–April). They mate again shortly afterwards, but delay implantation until the following February. The Japanese badger is more solitary than the European badger; it does not aggregate into social clans, and mates do not form pair bonds. During mating season, the range of a male badger overlaps with those of 2 to 3 females. Badgers with overlapping ranges may communicate by scent marking.

== Habitats ==
This badger species is found in a variety of woodland and forest habitats.

== Diet ==
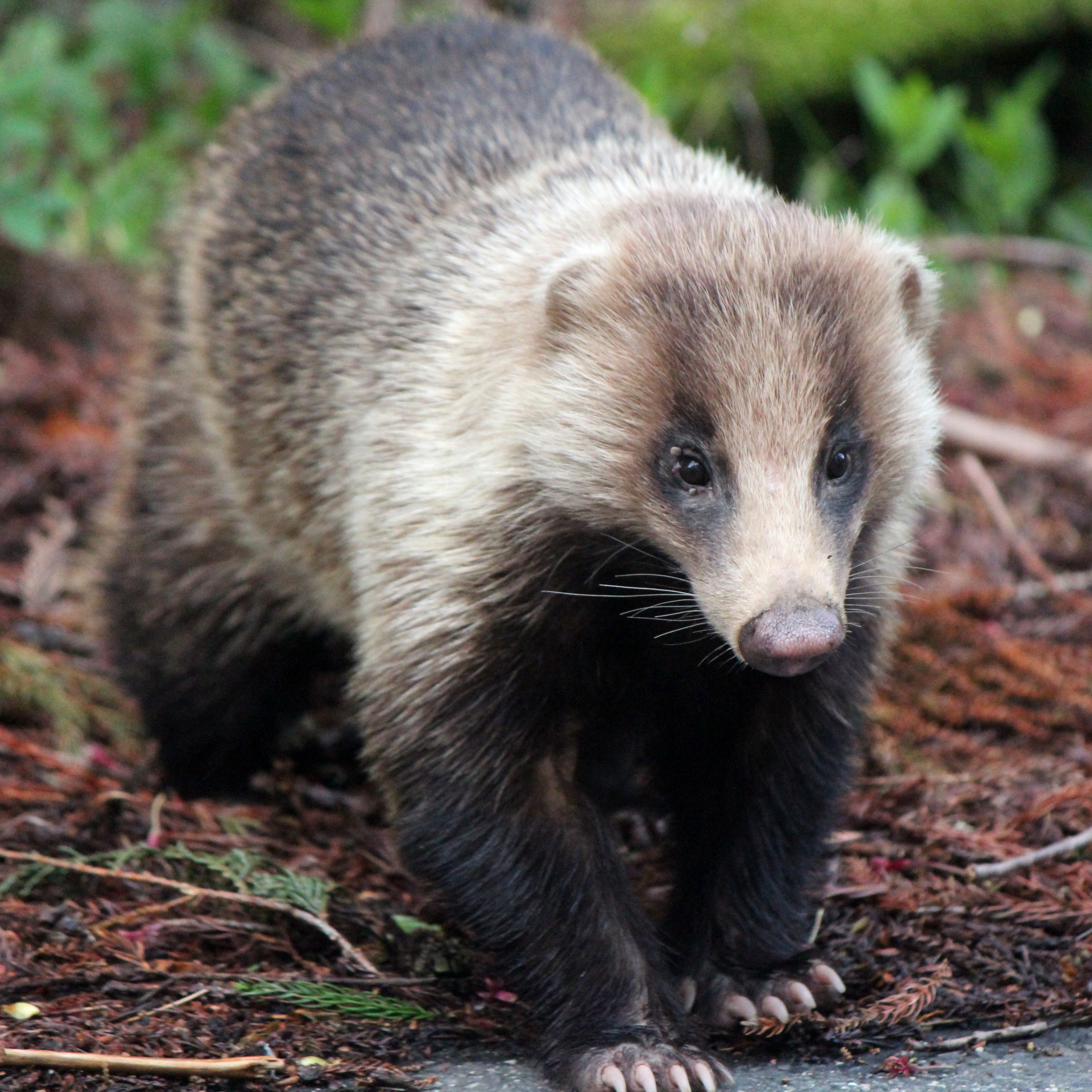
On Mount Gozaisho

Similar to other badgers, the Japanese badger's diet is omnivorous; it includes earthworms, beetles, berries and persimmons. The Japanese badger's diet varies depending on seasonal availability. Based on fecal analysis, studies have shown that earthworm consumption is highest in the warmer seasons, coupled with berries, persimmons, and small insects in the summer months. When earthworms are less abundant in cooler months, the Japanese badger consumes more wild berries, like Rubus palmatus and Rubus hirsutus, while consuming the most persimmons during the fruit's peak availability in the fall season.

== Threats ==
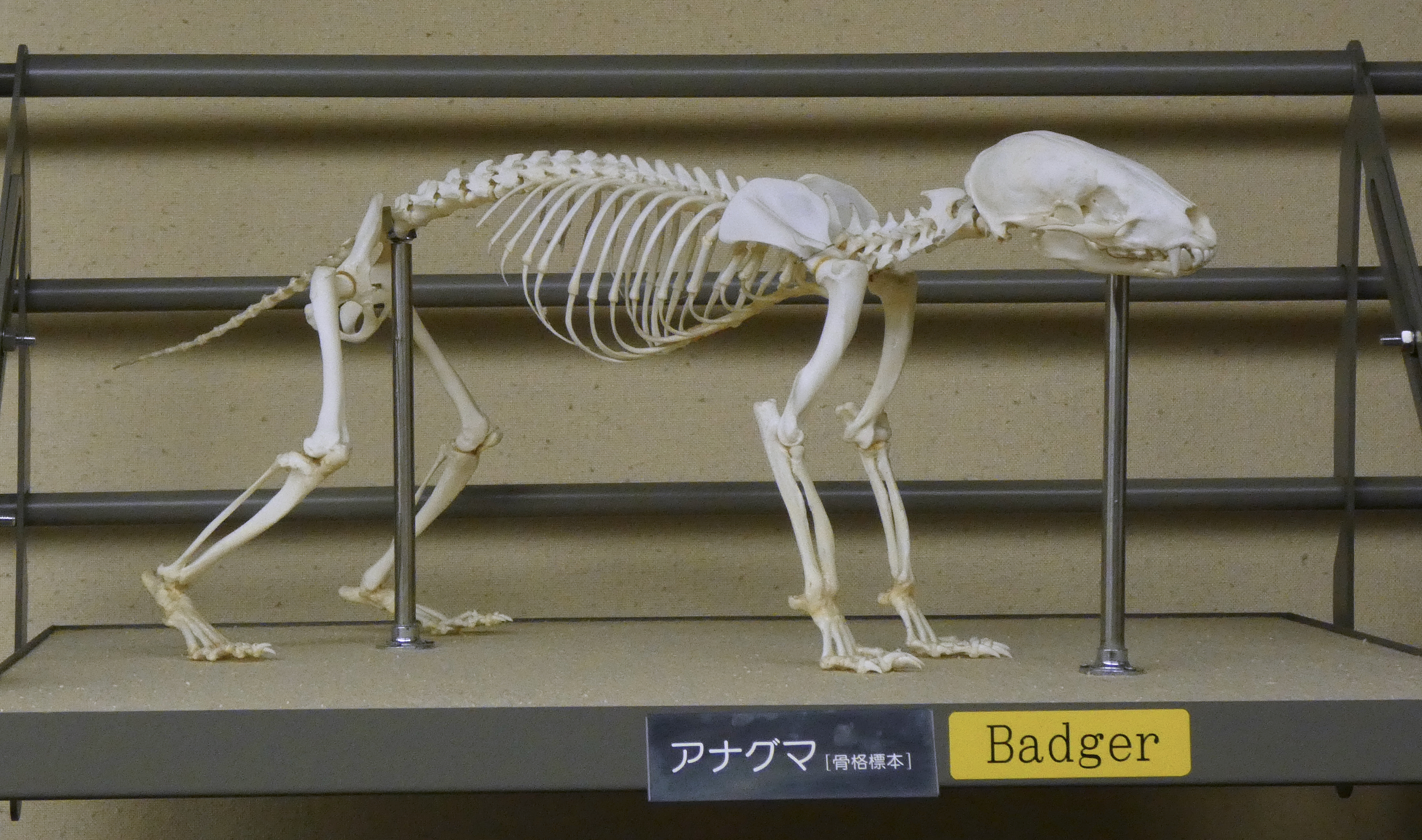
Skeleton at Higashiyama Zoo and Botanical Gardens

Although it remains common, the range of Meles anakuma has shrunk recently. Covering an estimated 29 per cent of the country in 2003, the area had decreased 7 per cent over the previous 25 years. Increased land development and agriculture, as well as competition from introduced raccoons are threats. Hunting is legal but has declined sharply since the 1970s.

In 2017, concern was raised by an upsurge in badger culling in Kyushu. Apparently encouraged by local government bounties and increased popularity of badger meat in Japanese restaurants, it is feared the culling may have reached an unsustainable level.

== Folklore ==
In Japanese mythology, badgers are shapeshifters known as mujina. In the Nihon Shoki, mujina were known to sing and shapeshift into other humans.

== See also ==
- Blakiston's Line, the faunal boundary line drawn between Hokkaidō in the north and Honshū, south of it, while certain animal species can only be found north of the line, certain other species can only be found south of it.
