= Trypanosoma pestanai =

Scientific classification
- Domain: Eukaryota
- Clade: Discoba
- Phylum: Euglenozoa
- Class: Kinetoplastea
- Order: Trypanosomatida
- Family: Trypanosomatidae
- Genus: Trypanosoma
- Subgenus: incertae sedis
- Species: T. pestanai

Binomial name
- Trypanosoma pestanai

Species of protist

Trypanosoma pestanai is a species of kinetoplastid trypanosomatid.

It causes disease in the European badger (Meles meles). Its vector is the badger flea (Paraceras melis).
