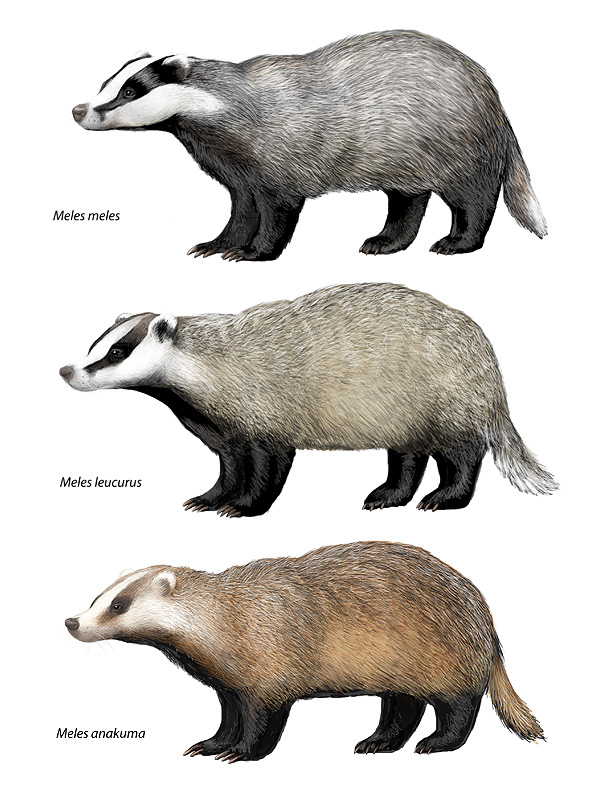
- Meles meles, M. leucurus, and M. anakuma.

Scientific classification
- Kingdom: Animalia
- Phylum: Chordata
- Class: Mammalia
- Order: Carnivora
- Family: Mustelidae
- Subfamily: Melinae
- Genus: Meles; Brisson, 1762

Type species
- [Ursus] meles Linnaeus, 1758

Species
- Meles meles + Meles canescens Meles leucurus Meles anakuma † Meles hollitzeri † Meles thorali
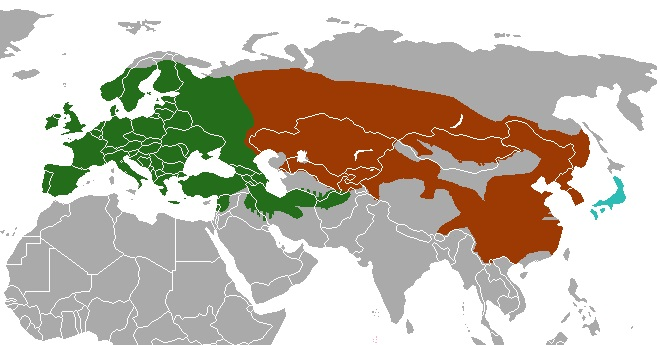
- Ranges of the four (considered three in map) extant species

= Meles (genus) =

Meles Temporal range: Early Pleistocene to present

Genus of carnivores

Meles is a genus of badgers containing four living species known as Eurasian badgers, the Japanese badger (Meles anakuma), Asian badger (Meles leucurus), Caucasian badger (Meles canescens) and European badger (Meles meles). In an older categorization, they were seen as a single species with three subspecies (Meles meles anakuma, Meles meles leucurus and Meles meles meles). There are also several extinct members of the genus. They are members of the subfamily Melinae of the weasel family, Mustelidae.

== Taxonomy ==
The genus Meles was erected by French zoologist Mathurin Jacques Brisson in 1762 after Carl Linnaeus had described the Eurasian badger Meles meles in 1758. This animal had a very extensive range over most of temperate Europe and Asia and there has been much discussion as to whether it is a single or three distinct species. There are geographical differences between individuals from different parts of the range in skull structure, morphology of the first premolar teeth, and facial markings. Some authorities advocated placing European and Asian badgers in separate species, Meles meles and Meles leptorhynchus (Milne-Edwards, 1867), the boundary between the two being the Volga River. Others considered three subspecies, M. m. meles found west of the Volga, M. m. arenarius-leptorhynchus found between the Volga and Transbaikalia, and M. m. amurensis-anakuma from the Amur and Primorsky regions.

Genetic studies of mitochondrial DNA show the separation of two variants on either side of the Volga but their exact taxonomic rank remains undefined. A further study of cheek teeth from individuals across the entire range supports this division and provides confirmation that M. meles and M. anakuma are indeed separate species.

=== Extant species ===
Species	Description	Current distribution
European badger Meles meles	Powerfully built animals with small heads; thick, short necks; stocky, wedge-shaped bodies; short legs, and club-shaped tails. Their feet are digitigrade and short, with five toes on each foot. The limbs are short and massive, with naked lower surfaces on the feet. The claws are strong and elongated, and have an obtuse end for digging. They have flexible snouts and small eyes and ears. The coat is harsh on the back and sides with long bristly guard hairs and a sparse, short-haired underlayer. The belly is clothed in fine short hairs. The colour of the back and sides is light silvery-grey, with straw-coloured highlights on the sides. The tail has long and coarse hairs, and is generally the same colour as the back. Two black bands pass along the head, starting from the upper lip and passing upwards to the whole base of the ears. Other parts of the face are white. Size varies according to subspecies but is usually between 60 and 90 centimetres (24 and 35 in) in body length and 12 and 24 cm (5 and 9 in) in tail length. Adult males are generally heavier than females and can weigh between 15 and 17 kilograms (33 and 37 lb) in autumn when maximum fat reserves are present.	across Europe and in parts of Asia west of the Volga River.
Caucasian badger Meles canescens	Smaller than European badger, with a dirty-greyish back and brown highlights; its head is identical to the European badger, though with weaker crests; its upper molars are elongated in a similar way as the Asian badger's.	Transcaucasia, the Kopet Dag, Turkmenistan, Kyrgyzstan, Iran, Levant, Tajikistan, Russia, Mesopotamia, Afghanistan, Asia Minor, islands of Crete and Rhodes.
Asian badger Meles leucurus	Smaller than European badgers but have larger upper cheek teeth. The colour varies somewhat over the large range but most individuals are lighter in colour than the European badger, though some forms may be much the same shade. In general, their colouration is more brownish-grey. Their sides are paler than the ridge of their backs and the dark facial streaks curve up behind the eyes and pass above the ears. The central pale band on the snout is correspondingly shorter and narrower and the white facial characteristics are altogether more brown-tinged. Their size varies by the region in which they live with males of the Siberian subspecies being about 70 centimetres (28 in) long and females about 65 centimetres (26 in), with males weighing between 10 and 13 kilograms (22 and 29 lb). Kazakh badgers are about the same length but males weigh less at 7 to 8.3 kilograms (15 to 18 lb). The Amur badger is between 60 and 70 centimetres (24 and 28 in) in length.	central and northern Asia east of the Volga River.
Japanese badger Meles anakuma	Smaller than the other two species, males being about 80 centimetres (31 in) long and females 72 centimetres (28 in). Their weight is usually between 4 and 8 kilograms (8.8 and 17.6 lb). They have a much browner coat and the facial markings are less distinct. Japanese badgers are nocturnal and hibernate during the coldest months of the year. Japanese badgers are more solitary than European badgers; they do not aggregate into social clans, and mates do not form pair bonds. During the mating season, the range of a male badger overlaps with those of two or three females. A female becomes sexually mature at two years of age and gives birth to a litter of two or three (occasionally four) cubs in March or April. Soon after this, the female mates again but implantation is delayed until the following February.	Endemic to Japan but are not present on the large island of Hokkaido.

=== Fossils ===
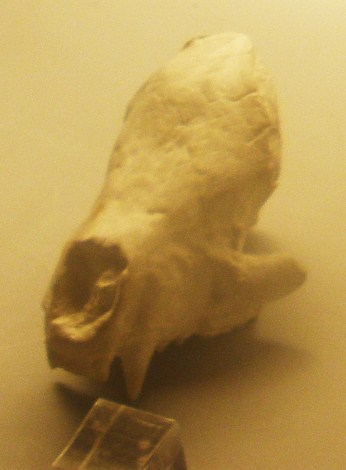
Meles thorali fossil skull

A further species is Meles thorali from the late Pleistocene, known only from fossil remains, specimens of which have been found at Saint-Vallier, Drôme, in southeastern France and Binagady, in Azerbaijan. These have large cheek teeth and characteristics intermediate between M. meles and M. anakuma. It is theorized that they were an ancestral species from which these two modern species diverged. Another extinct species from Europe is Meles hollitzeri from the Early Pleistocene, remains of which were found in Deutsch-Altenburg, in northeastern Austria, and Untermassfeld, in southeastern Germany.

== Cited texts ==
- Heptner, V. G.; Sludskii, A. A. (2002). Mammals of the Soviet Union. Vol. II, part 1b, Carnivores (Mustelidae). Smithsonian Institution Libraries and National Science Foundation. ISBN 90-04-08876-8.
