= Winter rest =

Annual state for some plants and animals

Winter rest (from the German term Winterruhe) is a state of reduced activity of plants and warm-blooded animals living in extratropical regions of the world during the more hostile environmental conditions of winter. In this state, they save energy during cold weather while they have limited access to food sources.

== Plants ==
Deciduous trees lose their foliage in the winter. Tree growth rings are a result of winter rest, as there is rapid growth in the warmer spring, then slower growth later in the year.

Perennial and biennial herbaceous plants lose their frost-sensitive, above-ground parts before the winter, and regrow in the spring. Herbaceous plants that are annual, producing seeds before the winter, can also be considered to have winter rest in some form, because their seeds may stay inactive over the winter before germinating. Annual plants which have seeds that germinate before winter also have winter rest. Winter cereals, for example, which are sown in the fall and germinate before the frost, become dormant during the winter and actually require a few weeks of cold before they are able to flower.

== Animals ==
Winter rest in an animal is different from true hibernation, since their metabolism is not reduced drastically. Body temperature is not significantly lowered, however their heart rate is reduced. This means that animals like the raccoon can quickly become active again if temperatures rise or the snow melts. Other animals that winter rest are badgers.

Although a bear's body temperature decreases less than that of other mammals which undergo true hibernation, mostly changing around 6-7 degrees Celsius, this is a result of their large, heat-retaining body masses. Their metabolism, the main indicator of hibernation, lowers significantly.

== See also ==
- Growing season
- Cereal germ — the part of the cereal seed that grows into a plant
- Seed dormancy
- Stratification — the simulation of natural winter conditions for seeds
- Thermoregulation — The ability for an organism to keep its temperature within a certain range
