= Paraceras melis =

Badger flea

Scientific classification
- Kingdom: Animalia
- Phylum: Arthropoda
- Class: Insecta
- Order: Siphonaptera
- Family: Ceratophyllidae
- Genus: Paraceras
- Species: P. melis

Binomial name
- Paraceras melis Walker, 1856

Species of flea

Paraceras melis, the badger flea, is an external parasite of the European badger (Meles meles). It has also been found on the fox (Vulpes vulpes), the dog (Canis familiaris), the cat (Felis catus), the European polecat (Mustela putorius), the mole (Talpa europaea) and the fallow deer (Dama dama).

== Description ==
The badger flea, like other fleas, is a small, dark brown wingless insect with a tough, chitinous cuticle. Its body is flattened laterally and it has mouthparts designed for sucking the blood of a badger.

== Biology ==
Like other fleas, the badger flea has a life cycle consisting of an egg, a larval, a pupal and an adult stage. A mature female flea has to have had a meal of blood before she starts to reproduce. After mating, the eggs are laid and often fall to the floor of the sett. The larvae that hatch out feed on organic debris and when fully developed, they weave cocoons and pupate. They remain in this state for several weeks, often being stimulated to emerge by warmth, vibrations or a raised level of carbon dioxide which indicates that a potential host is nearby. The newly hatched flea's primary aim is to find a host, have a meal of blood and reproduce.

The badger flea is the vector of Trypanosoma pestanai, the causal agent of a protozoan disease of badgers that has been found in badgers living in Portugal, France, England, and Ireland.

== Behaviour ==
Badgers spend much time grooming in an effort to dislodge parasites. Individuals concentrate on their undersides while social grooming occurs with one individual grooming another on its dorsal surface. Fleas try to avoid the scratching, retreating rapidly downwards and backwards with the lie of the fur. This is in contrast to fleas away from their host which run upwards and jump when disturbed. The grooming seems to disadvantage the fleas rather than merely having a social function.

Researchers have found that when separated from their host, badger fleas jump repeatedly in an effort to reconnect. Many voided their gut contents which enabled them to leap significantly further. If they failed to find a suitable host they moved towards the light (the sett entrance) before becoming quiescent. This put them in a position to intercept a badger if one entered the sett. They were stimulated into further bouts of leaping by an increase in the level of carbon dioxide and jumped towards the source of the gas. In a research study they were found to respond to exhaled air by running and jumping in its direction. The most vigorous response was found to be made to a combination of a carbon dioxide source, a piece of dark-coloured card and movement in their vicinity. It was found that 50% of fleas were still alive after 35 days of separation from the host and, as badgers have a habit of moving between different setts, they would not avoid reinfestation by fleas if they returned to an empty sett within a few weeks.
