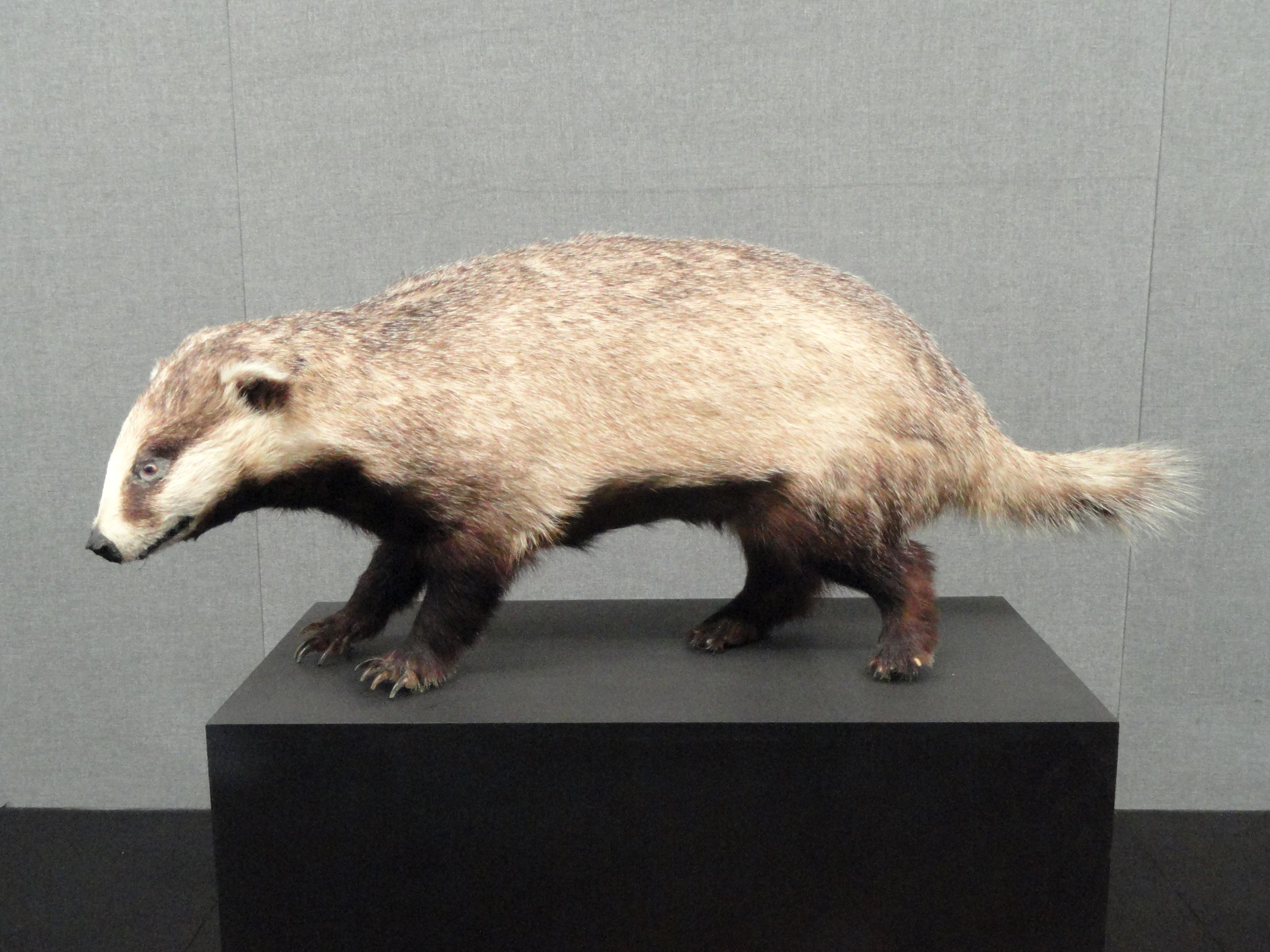
- Stuffed specimen

Conservation status
- Least Concern (IUCN 3.1)

Scientific classification
- Kingdom: Animalia
- Phylum: Chordata
- Class: Mammalia
- Order: Carnivora
- Family: Mustelidae
- Genus: Meles
- Species: M. leucurus

Binomial name
- Meles leucurus Hodgson, 1847
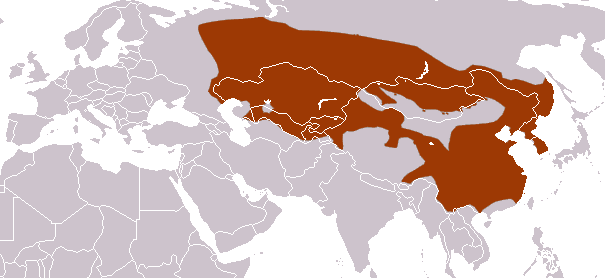
- Asian badger range

= Asian badger =

Species of carnivore

The Asian badger (Meles leucurus), also known as the sand badger, is a species of badger native to Mongolia, China, Kazakhstan, Kyrgyzstan, Uzbekistan, the Korean Peninsula and Russia.

== Characteristics ==
The Asian badger is mostly lighter in colour than the European badger, though some forms may closely approach the former in colour, if not darker, with smudges of ocherous and brownish highlights. The flanks are lighter than the middle of the back, and the facial stripes are usually brown rather than black. The facial stripes narrow behind the eyes and extend above the ears. The white parts of the head are usually dirtier in colour than those of the European badger. The light stripe passing along the top of the head between the two stripes is relatively short and narrow. The Asian badger is generally smaller than the European badger and has relatively longer upper molars. It appears to be the smallest of the three Meles badgers despite regional size variations, with the largest-bodied populations in Siberia. Body mass typically ranges from 3.5 to 9 kg (7.7 to 19.8 lb) and length from 50 to 70 cm (20 to 28 in). The average weight of three adult males from Sobaeksan National Park was 6 kg (13 lb).

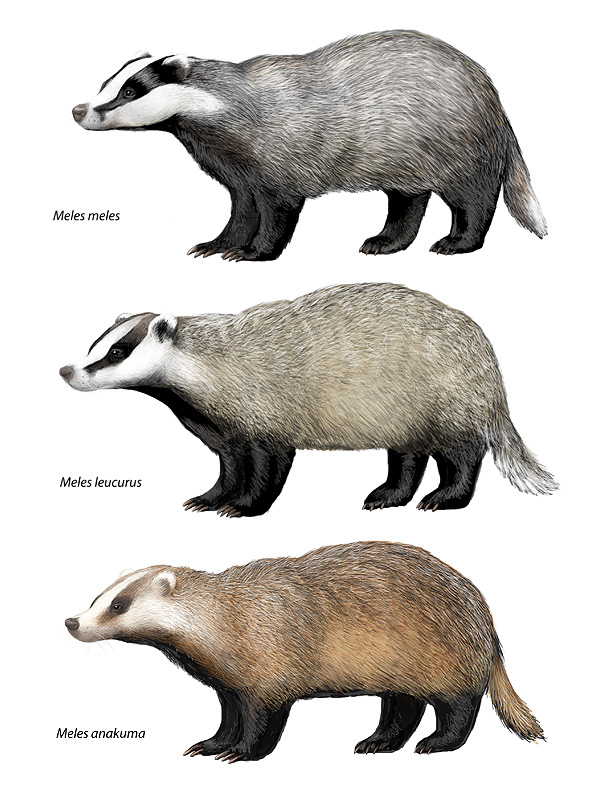
Comparative illustration of European badger (top), Asian badger (centre) and Japanese badger (bottom)

== Taxonomy ==
Five subspecies are recognized.

Subspecies	Trinomial authority	Description	Range	Synonyms
Common sand badger Meles leucurus leucurus	Hodgson, 1847			blanfordi (Matschie, 1907); chinensis (Gray, 1868); hanensis (Matschie, 1907); leptorhynchus (Milne-Edwards, 1867); siningensis (Matschie, 1907); tsingtauensis (Matschie, 1907)
Amur badger Meles leucurus amurensis	Schrenck, 1859	The darkest coloured and smallest subspecies. The facial stripes extend above the ears, and are black or blackish-brown in colour. The entire area between the stripes and cheeks are dirty-greyish brown, as opposed to white. The colour can be so dark, that the stripes are almost indistinguishable. The back is greyish-brown with silver highlights. The pelage itself is soft, but is lacking in wool. The skull is small, smooth and has weakly developed projections. It lacks first premolars. Body length is 60–70 centimetres (24–28 in).	Ussuri, Priamurye, Greater Khingan and Korean Peninsula	melanogenys (J. A. Allen, 1913), schrenkii (Nehring, 1891)
Kazakh badger Meles leucurus arenarius	Satunin, 1895	A moderately sized subspecies, being intermediate in size between Meles meles meles and M. m. canascens. Its colour is lighter and paler than its northern cousins, with less prominent facial stripes. Its pelage is coarse and bristly, and has scarce underfur. Boars grow to 70–78 centimetres (28–31 in) in body length, while sows grow to 61–70 centimetres (24–28 in). Boars weigh 7.8–8.3 kilograms (17–18 lb) in March–May, and 5.6–7 kilograms (12–15 lb) in March–June.	Southeastern Volga, most of Kazakhstan (excepting the northern and montane parts), the Middle Asian plains (excepting the regions occupied by Meles m. canascens and Meles m. severzovi)	
Siberian badger Meles leucurus sibiricus	Kastschenko, 1900	A moderately sized subspecies, being intermediate in size between Meles meles meles and M. m. canascens. The general colour tone of the back is light grey, usually with yellowish or straw coloured highlights. The facial stripes are brownish-black to tawny black. The pelage is long and soft with a dense undercoat. Boars grow to 65.7–75 centimetres (25.9–29.5 in) in body length, while sows grow to 62–69.2 centimetres (24.4–27.2 in). Boars weigh 10–13.6 kilograms (22–30 lb).	Siberia, including Transbaikalia and Altai, northern Kazakhstan and probably the eastern Volga	aberrans (Stroganov, 1962); altaicus (Kastschenko, 1902); enisseyensis (Petrov, 1953); eversmanni (Petrov, 1953); raddei (Kastschenko, 1902)
Tian Shan badger Meles leucurus tianschanensis	Hoyningen-Huene, 1910	A moderately sized subspecies, with a somewhat darker pelt than M. l. arenarius and a less developed yellow sheen. The fur is longer, denser and fluffier.	Northern Tian Shan	talassicus (Ognev, 1931)

== Distribution and habitat ==
In Russia

The Asian badger has a large range including the southern portion of Russia east of the Volga River and of the Urals, Kazakhstan, Mongolia, China, and Korea. It occurs in areas of high elevation up to 4,000 m (13,000 ft)) in the Ural Mountains, the Tian Shan mountains and the Tibetan Plateau. It prefers open deciduous woodland and adjacent pastureland, but also inhabits coniferous and mixed woodlands, shrubland and steppe. It sometimes enters suburban areas.

== Behaviour and ecology ==
The Asian badger is usually fossorial, but occasionally also climbs trees as evidenced by camera trap footage showing it climbing Korean oak (Quercus dentata) in South Korea.

== Threats ==
The Asian badger is legally hunted in China, Russia and Mongolia, as well as illegally in South Korea and within protected areas in China. Russia's established badger hunting season usually takes place from August to November.

In South Korea, the Asian badger is used in traditional medicine, eaten as food and used for certain badger-derived cosmetics. Badger farms have existed in the country since the 1990s. In 2009, there were approximately 5000 Asian badgers on South Korean badger farms.
