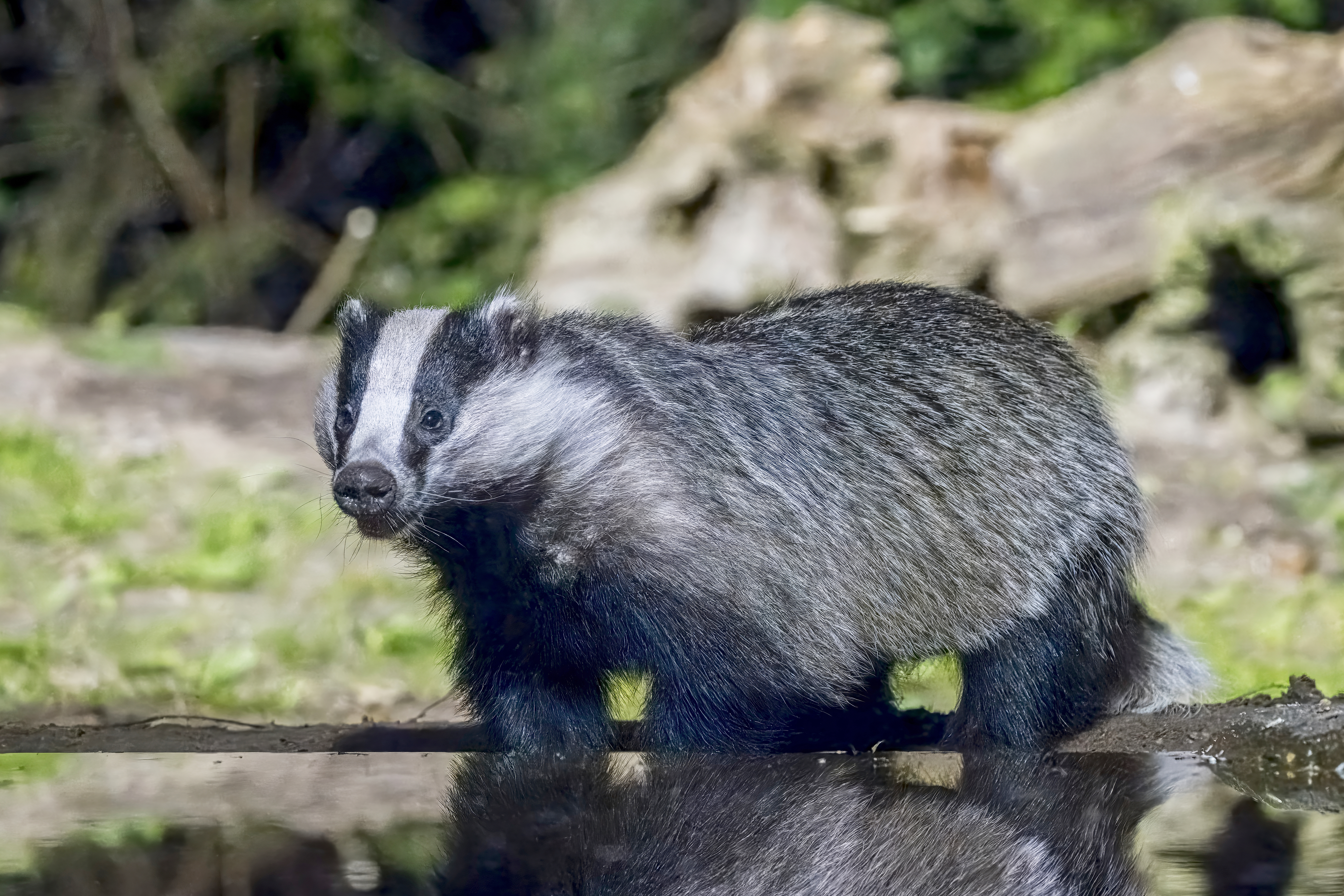
- M. m. taxus, the Netherlands

Conservation status
- Least Concern (IUCN 3.1)

Scientific classification
- Kingdom: Animalia
- Phylum: Chordata
- Class: Mammalia
- Order: Carnivora
- Family: Mustelidae
- Genus: Meles
- Species: M. meles

Binomial name
- Meles meles (Linnaeus, 1758)
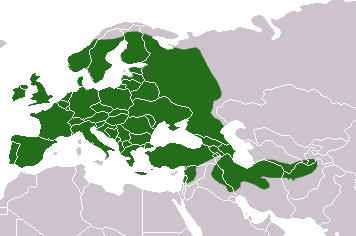
- European badger range (also includes Caucasian badger range)

Synonyms
- Ursus meles Linnaeus, 1758

Audio
- Calls recorded in Surrey, England

= European badger =

European badger Temporal range: 0.7–0 Ma Middle Pleistocene – Recent

Species of mustelid

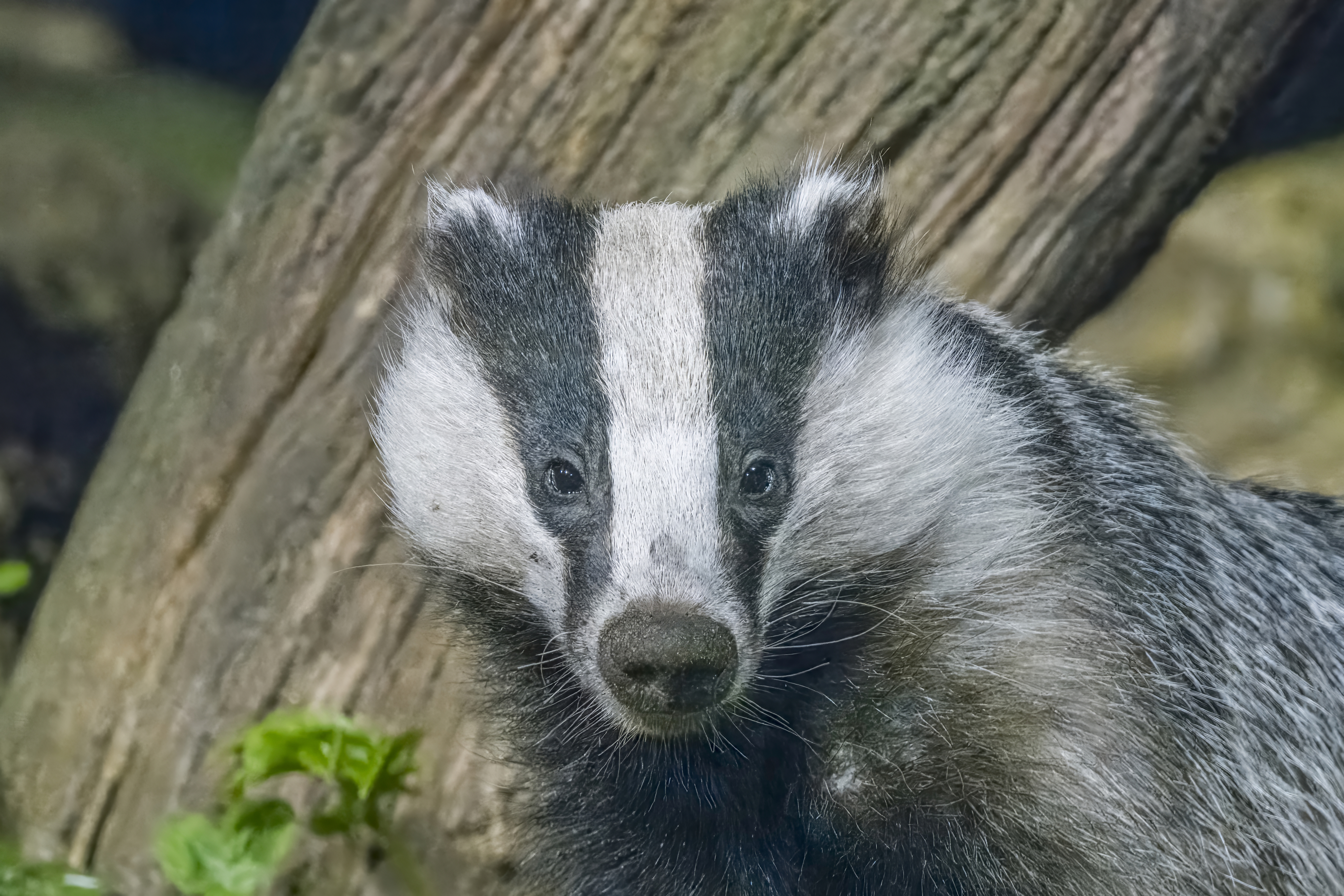
in the Netherlands

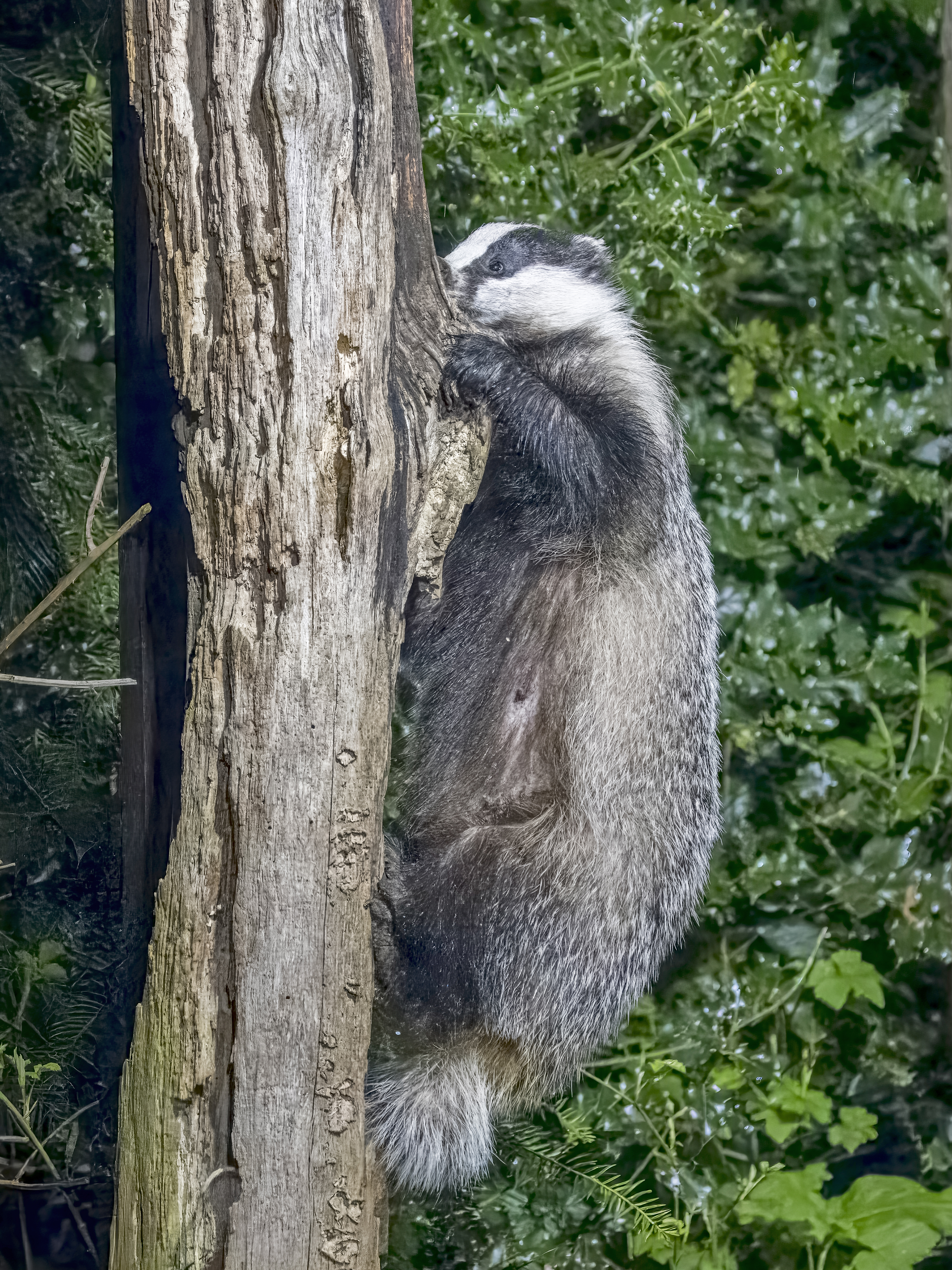
climbing a tree

The European badger (Meles meles), also known as the Eurasian badger, is a species of badger in the family Mustelidae native to Europe and West Asia and parts of Central Asia. It is classified as least concern on the IUCN Red List due to its wide range and large, stable population size which is thought to be increasing in some regions. Several subspecies are recognised, with the nominate subspecies (M. m. meles) predominating in most of Europe. In the UK it is the only extant species, and is simply known as the "badger".

The European badger is a powerfully built animal with a small head, stocky body, small black eyes and short tail, and a coat of black, white, brown, and grey fur. Its weight varies, ranging from 7–13 kg (15–29 lb) in spring to 15–17 kg (33–37 lb) in autumn before the winter sleep period. It is nocturnal and social, living in burrows and sleeping during the day in one of several setts within its territory. These burrows have multiple chambers and entrances and comprise extensive systems of underground passages measuring 35–81 m (115–266 ft) in length. Several badger families use these setts for decades. Badgers are particular about the cleanliness of their burrows, carrying in fresh bedding and removing soiled material. They defecate in latrines situated strategically outside their setts or en route to others.

Although the European badger is taxonomically classified as a carnivoran, it is actually an omnivore that feeds on a variety of plant and animal foods, including earthworms, large insects, small mammals, carrion, cereals, and tubers. Litters of up to five cubs are born in spring. The young are weaned after a few months, but they usually remain within the family group. European badgers have been known to share their burrows with other species, such as rabbits, red foxes, and raccoon dogs. However, they can be ferocious when provoked, a trait that was exploited in the now illegal blood sport of badger-baiting. Like many wild and domesticated mammals, badgers can carry bovine tuberculosis, which can spread between species and be particularly detrimental to cattle. In England, badger populations are culled in an attempt to reduce the incidence of bovine tuberculosis in cattle, although the efficacy of this practice is sometimes disputed, and badger culls are considered cruel and inhumane by some people.

== Nomenclature ==
The source of the word "badger" is uncertain. The Oxford English Dictionary states that it probably derives from "badge" + -ard, in reference to the white mark on its forehead that resembles a badge. This etymology may date to the early 16th century. The French word bêcheur ('digger') has also been suggested as a source. A male badger is a boar, a female is a sow, and a young badger is a cub. A badger's home is called a sett. Badger colonies are often called clans.

The far older name "brock" (Old English: brocc, Scots: brock) is a Celtic loanword (cf. Gaelic broc and Welsh broch, from Proto-Celtic *brokko) meaning 'grey'. The Proto-Germanic term was *þahsu- (cf. German Dachs, Dutch das, Norwegian svin-toks; Early Modern English dasse), probably from the PIE root *tek'- 'to construct', which suggests that the badger was named after its digging of setts (tunnels); the Germanic term *þahsu- became taxus or taxō, -ōnis in Latin glosses, replacing mēlēs ('marten' or 'badger'), and from these words the common Romance terms for the animal evolved (Italian tasso, French tesson/taisson/tasson—now blaireau is more common—, Catalan toixó, Spanish tejón, Portuguese texugo) except Asturian melandru.

Until the mid-18th century, the European badger was known by various names in English, including brock, pate, grey, and bawson. The name "bawson" is derived from "bawsened", meaning striped with white. "Pate" is a local name that was once popular in northern England. The name "badget" was once common, but only used in Norfolk, while "earth dog" was used in southern Ireland. The badger is commonly referred to in Welsh as a mochyn daear ('earth pig').

== Taxonomy ==
Ursus meles was the scientific name used by Carl Linnaeus in 1758, who described the badger in his work Systema Naturae.

=== Evolution ===
The species probably evolved from the Chinese Meles thorali of the early Pleistocene. The modern species originated in the early Middle Pleistocene, as evidenced by fossil sites in Episcopia, Grombasek, Süssenborn, Hundsheim, Erpfingen, Koněprusy, Mosbach 2, and Stránská Skála. Comparisons between fossil and living specimens demonstrate a progressive adaptation to omnivory, particularly evident in the increased surface area of the molars and the modification of the carnassials. Badger bones are occasionally discovered in earlier strata due to the burrowing habits of the species.

=== Subspecies ===
In the 19th and 20th centuries, several badger type specimens were described and proposed as subspecies. As of 2005, eight subspecies were recognized as valid taxa, but four (canescens, arcalus, rhodius, severzovi) are now considered to belong to a distinct species, the Caucasian badger (M. canescens).

Subspecies	Trinomial authority and synonyms	Description	Range
Common badger (M. m. meles)	Linnaeus, 1758 taxus (Boddaert, 1785) alba (Gmelin, 1788) maculata (Gmelin, 1788) vulgaris (Tiedemann, 1808) europaeus (Desmarest, 1816) caninus (Billberg, 1827) communis (Billberg, 1827) typicus (Barrett-Hamilton, 1899) britannicus (Satunin, 1905) caucasicus (Ognev, 1926) tauricus (Ognev, 1926) danicus (Degerbøl, 1933)	A large subspecies with a strongly developed sagittal crest, it has a soft pelage and relatively dense underfur. The back has a relatively pure silvery-grey tone, while the main tone of the head is pure white. The dark stripes are wide and black, while the white fields fully extend along the upper and lateral parts of the neck. It can weigh up to 20–24 kg in autumn, with some specimens attaining even larger sizes.	Continental Europe, except for the Iberian Peninsula. Its eastern range encompasses the European area of the former Soviet Union eastward to the Volga, Crimea, Ciscaucasia, and the northern Caucasus
Iberian badger (M. m. marianensis)	Graells, 1897 mediterraneus (Barrett-Hamilton, 1899)		Spain and Portugal
Kizlyar badger (M. m. heptneri)	Ognev, 1931	A large subspecies, it exhibits several traits of the Asian badger, namely its very pale, dull, dirty-greyish-ocherous colour and narrow head stripes.	Steppe region of northeastern Ciscaucasia, the Kalmytsk steppes and the Volga delta
Norwegian badger (M. m. milleri)	Baryshnikov, Puzachenko and Abramov, 2003	This subspecies has a smaller skull and smaller teeth than the nominate badger subspecies in Sweden and Finland.	Southwestern Norway, west of Telemark

In 2009, a cranial study was conducted comparing the skulls of European badgers from different regions. The results of the study suggested that the European badgers could be divided into three subspecies: M. m. millerei (Baryshnikov et al., 2003) for the south-western Norwegian badgers, M. m. meles (Linnaeus, 1758) for the main Fennoscandian badgers and the name M. m. europaeus (Desmarest, 1816) was proposed for the non-Fennoscandian badgers. In 2016, the system of three Meles meles subspecies was appointed again, but the name for the non-Fennoscandian badgers was corrected to M. m. taxus (Boddaert, 1785). The new taxonomic system of Meles meles subspecies can be summarized as follows:

Subspecies	Trinomial authority and synonyms	Range
Swedish badger (M. m. meles)	Linnaeus, 1758 europaeus (Desmarest, 1816) caninus (Billberg, 1827) communis (Billberg, 1827) typicus (Barrett-Hamilton, 1899)	Sweden, the eastern part of Norway, and southern Finland.
Common badger (M. m. taxus)	Boddaert, 1785 alba (Gmelin, 1788) maculata (Gmelin, 1788) vulgaris (Tiedemann, 1808) marianensis (Graells, 1897) mediterraneus (Barrett-Hamilton, 1899) britannicus (Satunin, 1905) caucasicus (Ognev, 1926) tauricus (Ognev, 1926) danicus (Degerbøl, 1933)	The British Islands, and all continental Europe, eastward to the Volga River and the North Caucasus.
Norwegian badger (M. m. milleri)	Baryshnikov et al., 2003	South-western Norway.

== Description ==
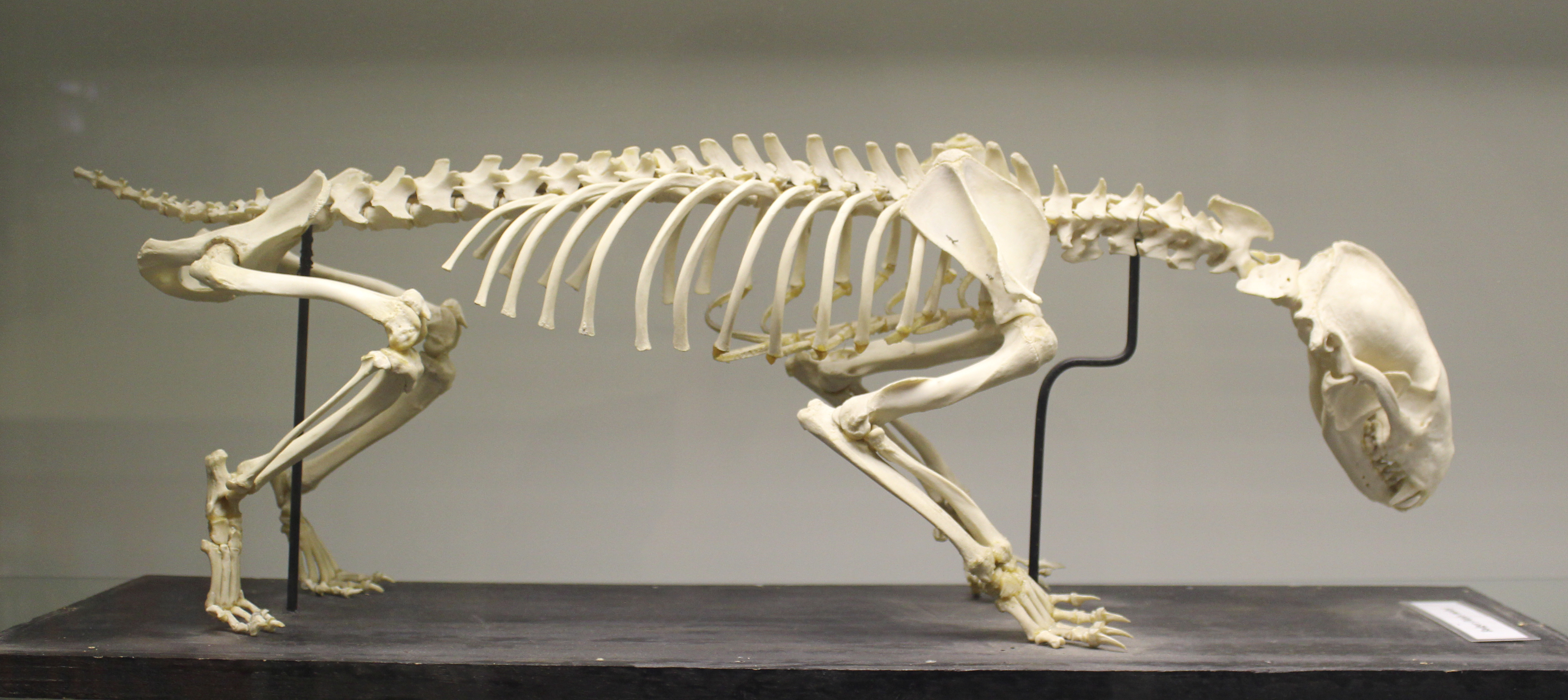
A European badger skeleton at the Royal Veterinary College

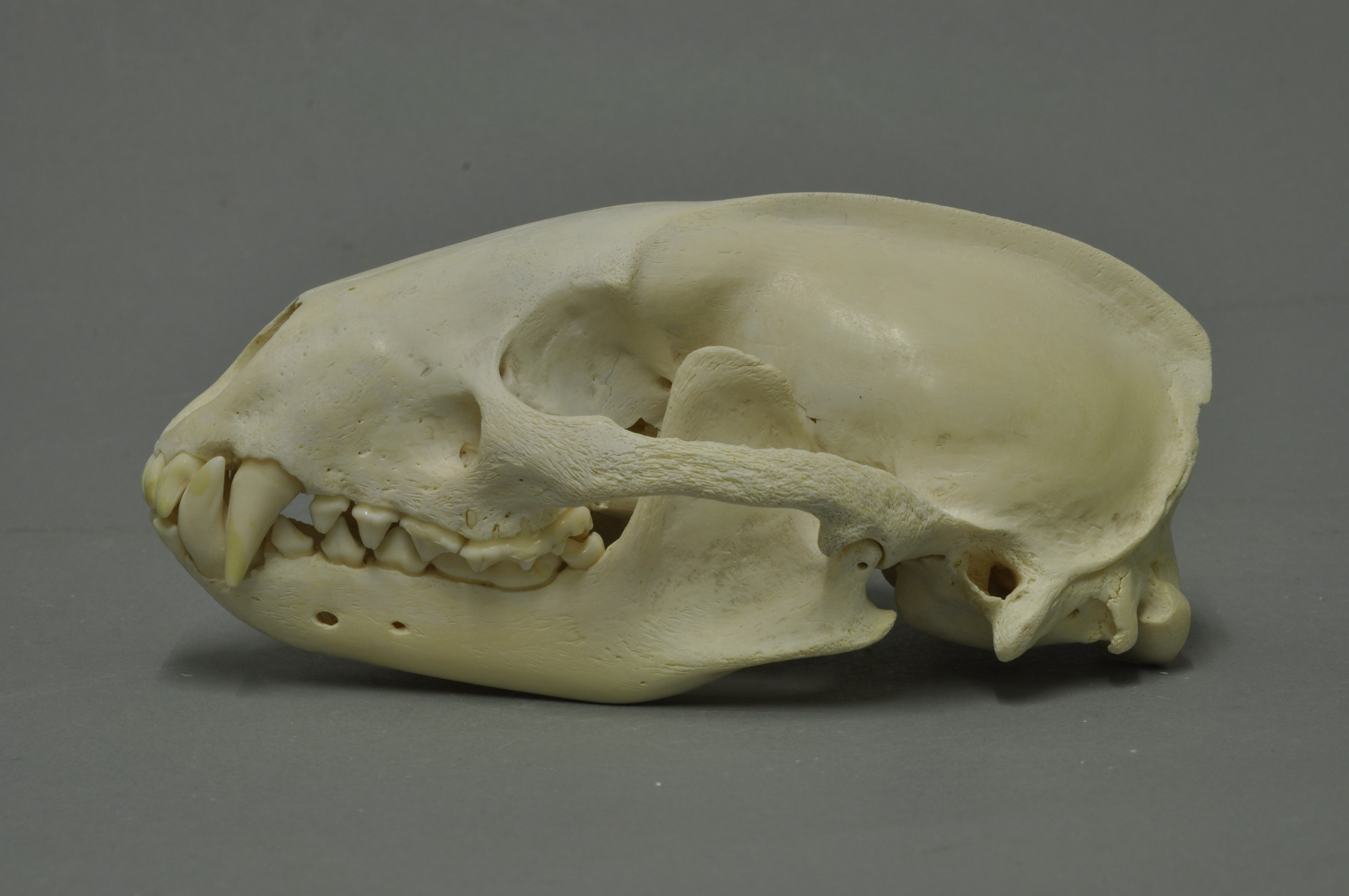
Skull of a European badger

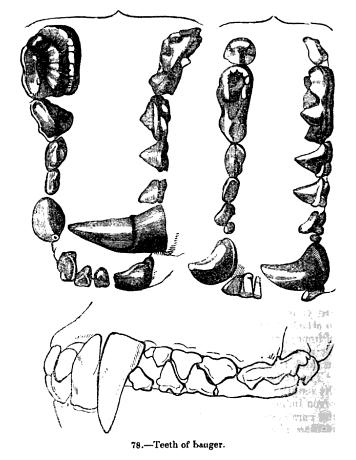
Dentition

European badgers are powerfully built animals with small heads, thick, short necks, stocky, wedge-shaped bodies and short tails. Their feet are either plantigrade or semi-digitigrade and short, with five toes on each foot. The limbs are short and massive, with bare lower surfaces on the feet. The claws are strong and elongated with an obtuse end to facilitate digging. The claws are not retractable, and the hind claws wear with age. Old badgers sometimes have their hind claws almost completely worn away from constant use. Their snouts, which are used for digging and probing, are muscular and flexible. Their eyes are small, and their ears are short and tipped with white. Whiskers are present on the snout and above the eyes.

Boars typically have broader heads, thicker necks and narrower tails than sows. Sows have sleeker bodies, narrower, less domed heads and fluffier tails. Badgers have longer guts than red foxes, reflecting their omnivorous diet. The small intestine has an average length of 5.36 m (17.6 ft) and lacks a cecum. Both sexes have three pairs of nipples, though these are more developed in females. European badgers cannot flex their backs like martens, polecats and wolverines, nor can they stand fully erect like honey badgers. However, they can move quickly at full gallop.

Adults measure 25–30 cm (9.8–11.8 in) at the shoulder, 60–90 cm (24–35 in) in body length, 12–24 cm (4.7–9.4 in) in tail length, 7.5–13 cm (3.0–5.1 in) in hind foot length and 3.5–7 cm (1.4–2.8 in) in ear height. Males (or boars) exceed females (or sows) slightly in these measurements, but can weigh considerably more. Their weight varies seasonally, growing from spring to autumn and peaking just before winter. During the summer, European badgers commonly weigh 7–13 kg (15–29 lb) and 15–17 kg (33–37 lb) in autumn.

The average weight of adults in the Białowieża Forest was 10.2 kg (22 lb) in spring but up to 19 kg (42 lb) in autumn, 46% higher than the spring low mass. In Woodchester Park, England, adults in spring weighed on average 7.9 kg (17 lb) and in fall average 9.5 kg (21 lb). In Doñana National Park, average weight of adult badgers is reported as 6 to 7.95 kg (13.2 to 17.5 lb), perhaps in accordance with Bergmann's rule, that its size decreases in relatively warmer climates. Sows can attain a top autumn weight of around 17.2 kg (38 lb), while exceptionally large boars have been reported in autumn.

The heaviest verified specimen was 27.2 kg (60 lb), though unverified reports have suggested weights of up to 30.8 kg (68 lb) and even 34 kg (75 lb) (if so, the heaviest weight for any terrestrial mustelid). If average weights are used, the European badger ranks as the second largest terrestrial mustelid, behind only the wolverine. Although they have an acute sense of smell, their eyesight is monochromatic, as has been demonstrasted by their lack of reaction to red lanterns. Only moving objects attract their attention. Their hearing is no better than that of humans.

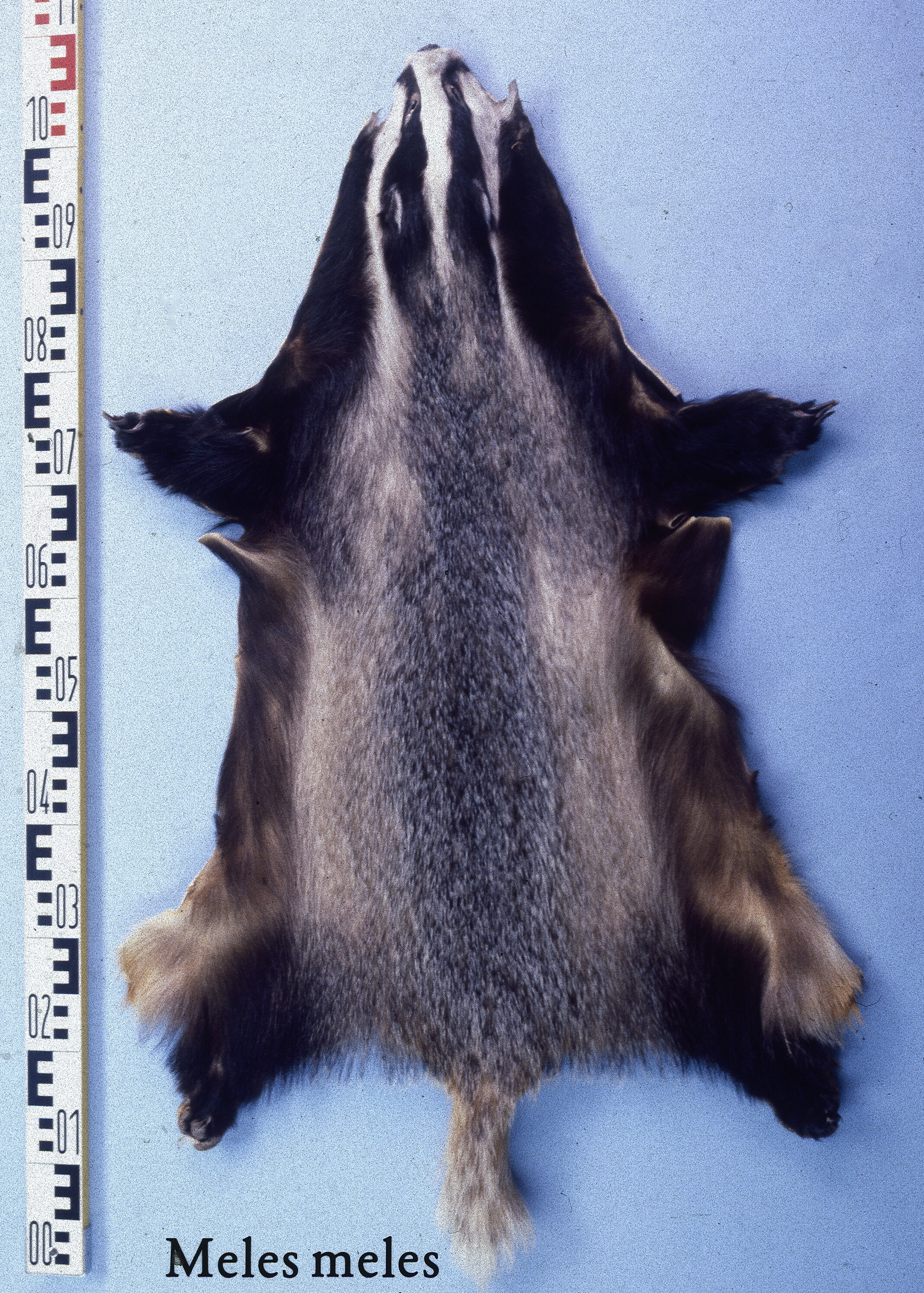
Badger skin – the contrasting markings of the fur serve to warn off attackers rather than camouflage, as they are conspicuous at night.

The skulls of European badgers are quite massive and heavy, with an elongated shape. Their braincases are oval in shape, while the front part of their skulls is elongated and narrow. Adults have prominent sagittal crests which can reach 15 mm in height in older males, and these are more strongly developed than those of honey badgers. Aside from anchoring the jaw muscles, the thickness of the crests protect their skulls from physical impact. Similar to martens, the dentition of European badgers is well-suited for their omnivorous diets. Their incisors are small and chisel-shaped, their canine teeth are prominent and their carnassials are not overly specialised. Their molars are flattened and adapted for grinding. Their jaws are powerful enough to crush most bones, and a provoked badger once bit down so heavily on a man's wrist that his hand had to be amputated. The dental formula is 3.1.3.13.1.4.2.

Scent glands are present below the base of the tail and around the anus. The subcaudal gland produces a cream-coloured, musky-smelling fatty substance, while the anal glands secrete a stronger-smelling, yellowish-brown fluid.

=== Fur ===
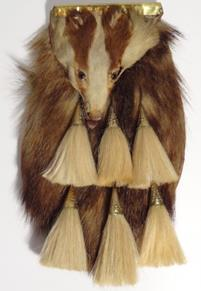
The pelt of a erythristic badger made into a sporran

In winter, the fur on the back and flanks is long and coarse, consisting of bristly guard hairs with a sparse, soft undercoat. The belly fur consists of short, sparse hairs, with skin being visible in the inguinal region. Guard hair length on the middle of the back is 75–80 mm (3.0–3.1 in) in winter. Prior to the winter, the throat, lower neck, chest and legs are black. The belly is of a lighter, brownish tint, while the inguinal region is brownish-grey. The general colour of the back and sides is light silvery-grey, with straw-coloured highlights on the sides. The tail has long and coarse hairs, and is generally the same colour as the back. Two black bands pass along the head, starting from the upper lip and passing upwards to the whole base of the ears. The bands sometimes extend along the neck and merge with the colour of the upper body. The front parts of the bands are 15 mm (0.59 in), and widen to 45–55 mm (1.8–2.2 in) in the ear region. A wide, white band extends from the nose tip through the forehead and crown. White markings occur on the lower part of the head, and extend backwards to a great part of the neck's length.

The summer fur is much coarser, shorter and sparser. It is also deeper in colour, with black tones becoming brownish and sometimes yellowish.

Partial melanism is known to occur in badgers, and albinos and leucistic individuals are not uncommon. Albino badgers are either pure white or yellowish with pink eyes, while leucistic badgers are similar but have normal eyes. Erythristic badgers are more common than albinos, and are characterised by a sandy-red colour on the parts of the body that are usually black. Yellow badgers are also known.

== Distribution and habitat ==
The European badger is native to most of Europe. It is found in Albania, Armenia, Austria, Belarus, Belgium, Bosnia and Herzegovina, Bulgaria, Crete, Croatia, Czechia, Denmark, Estonia, Finland, France, Georgia, Germany, Great Britain, Greece, Hungary, Ireland, Italy, Latvia, Lithuania, Luxembourg, Macedonia, Moldova, Montenegro, the Netherlands, Norway, Poland, Portugal, Romania, Russia, Serbia, Slovakia, Slovenia, Spain, Sweden, Switzerland and Ukraine.

The distributional boundary between the ranges of European and Asian badgers is the Volga River; the European species inhabits the western bank. The boundary between the ranges of the European and Caucasian badgers is in the North Caucasus. However, a clear boundary has not been defined, and the two species are sympatric in some regions, potentially forming a hybrid zone. They are common in European Russia, where 30,000 individuals were recorded in 1990. They are abundant and increasing throughout their range, partly due to a reduction in rabies in Central Europe. In the UK, the badger population increased by 77% during the 1980s and 1990s. The badger population in Great Britain in 2012 was estimated to be 300,000.

The European badger inhabits deciduous and mixed woodlands, clearings, spinneys, pastureland and scrub, including Mediterranean maquis shrubland. It has adapted to living in suburban areas and urban parks, though not to the same extent as red foxes. In mountainous regions, it can be found at altitudes of up to 2,000 m (6,600 ft).

== Behaviour and ecology ==
=== Social and territorial behaviour ===
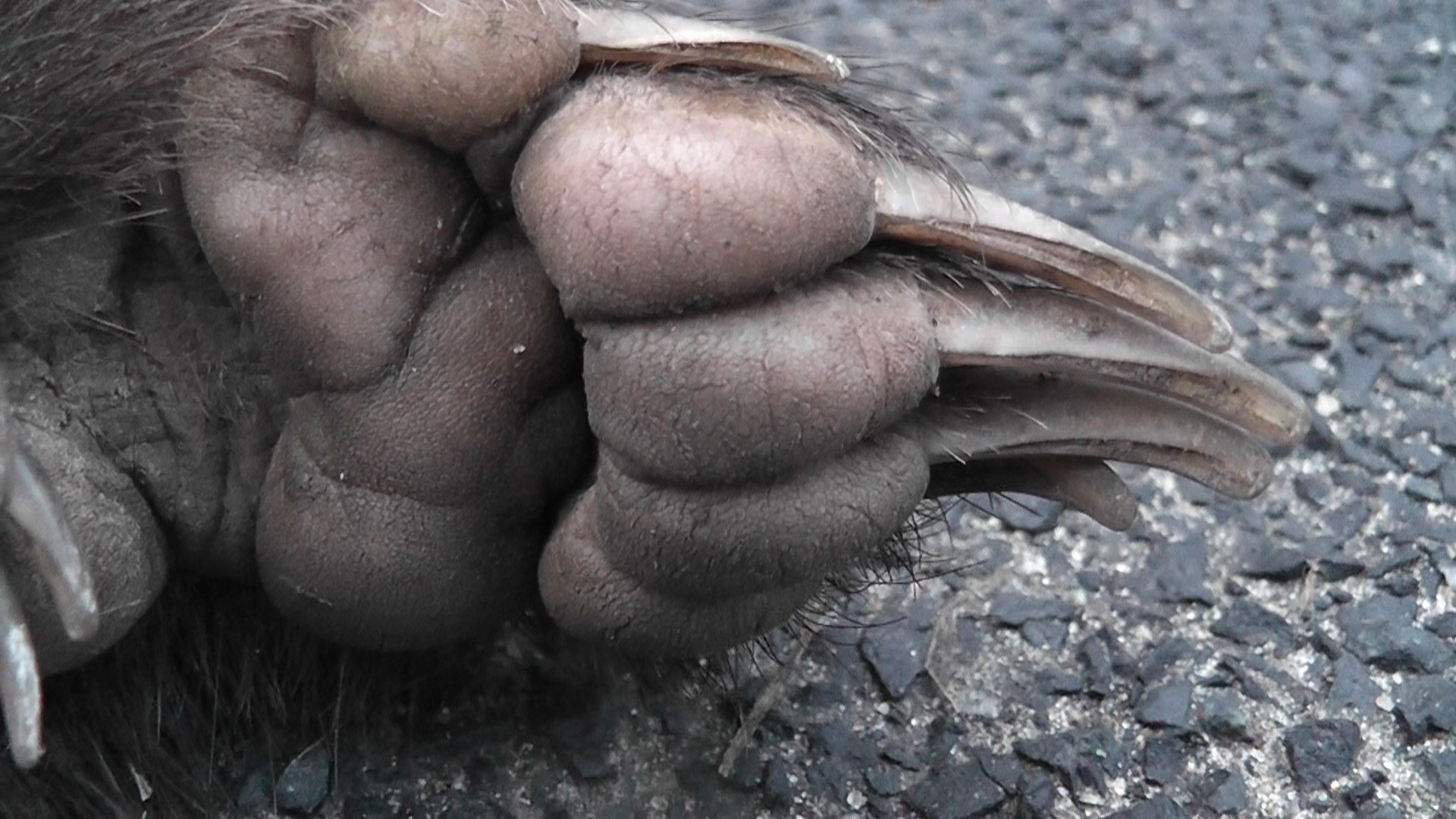
A badger's claws

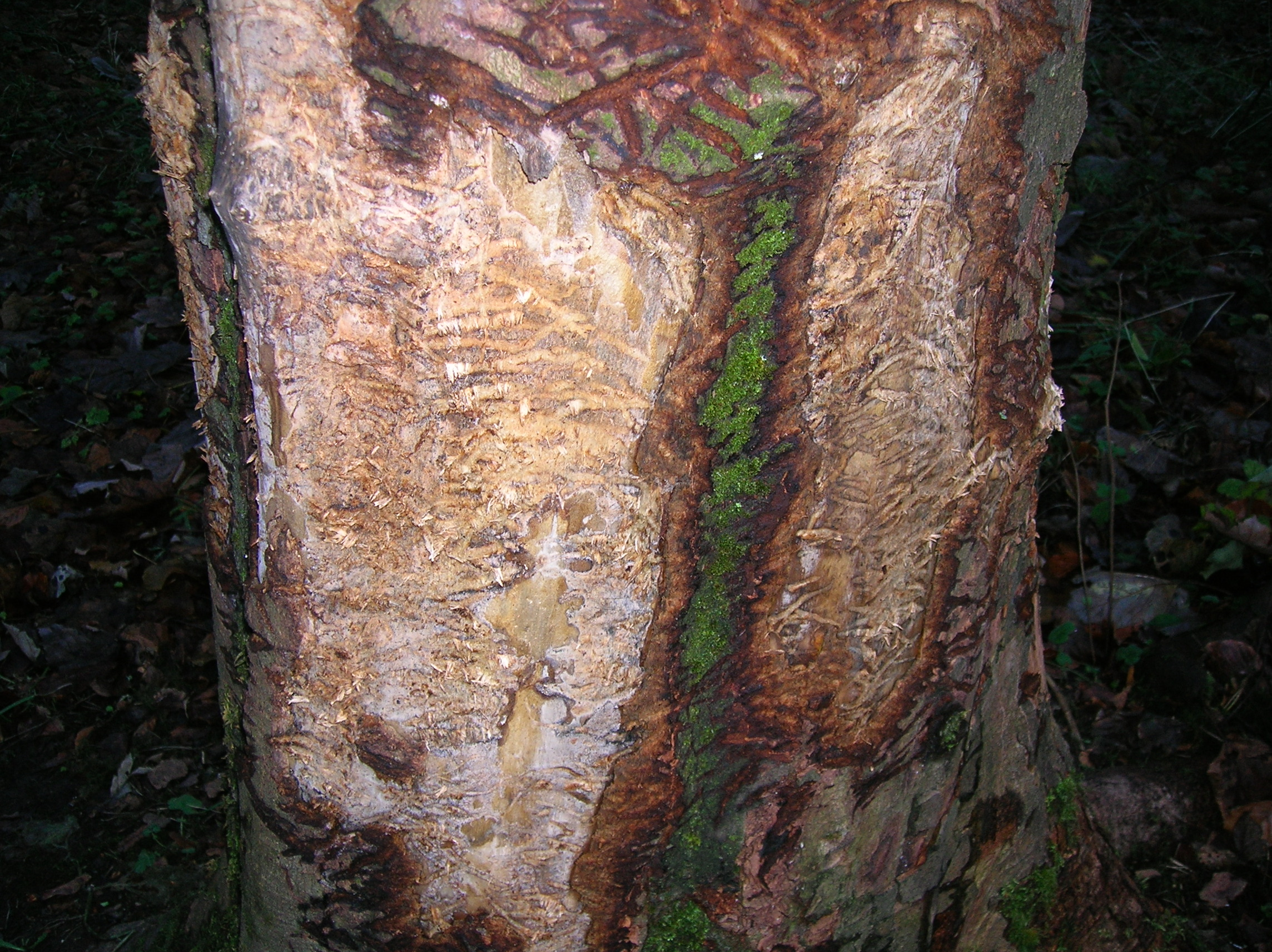
Scratching-tree of badgers

Two European badgers grooming each other

European badgers are the most sociable of all badger species, forming groups of six adults on average, though larger groups of up to 23 individuals have been recorded. Group size may be related to habitat composition. Under optimal conditions, badger territories can be as small as 30 ha (74 acres), but may be as large as 150 ha (370 acres) in marginal areas. Badger territories can be identified by the presence of communal latrines and well-worn paths. It is mainly males that are involved in territorial aggression. A hierarchical social system is thought to exist among badgers and large powerful boars seem to assert dominance over smaller males. Large boars sometimes intrude into neighbouring territories during the main mating season in early spring.

Sparring and more vicious fights generally result from territorial defence during the breeding season. However, animals within and outside a group generally show considerable tolerance towards each other. Boars tend to mark their territories more actively than sows, with their territorial activity increasing during the mating season in early spring. Badgers groom each other thoroughly using their claws and teeth. This grooming may have a social function. They are crepuscular and nocturnal by nature. Aggression among badgers is largely associated with territorial defence and mating. When fighting, they bite each other on the neck and rump while running and chasing each other, and the resulting injuries can sometimes be fatal. When attacked by dogs or when sexually excited, badgers may raise their tails and fluff up their fur.

Grunting and snuffling sounds

European badgers have an extensive vocal repertoire. When threatened, they emit deep growls and, when fighting, make low kekkering noises. They bark when surprised, whicker when playing or in distress, and emit a piercing scream when alarmed or frightened.

=== Denning behaviour ===
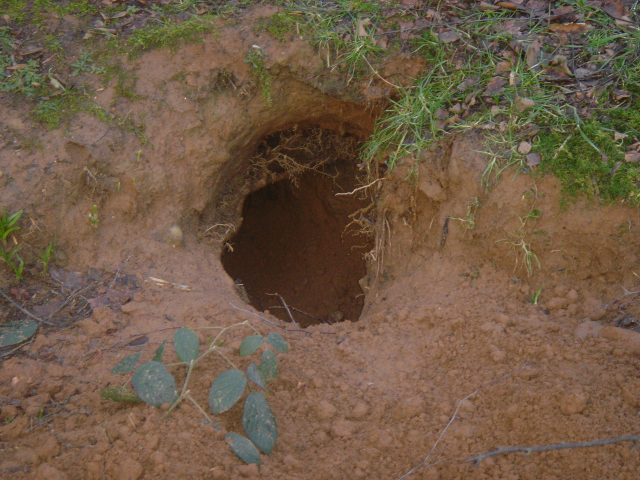
Entrance to a badger sett

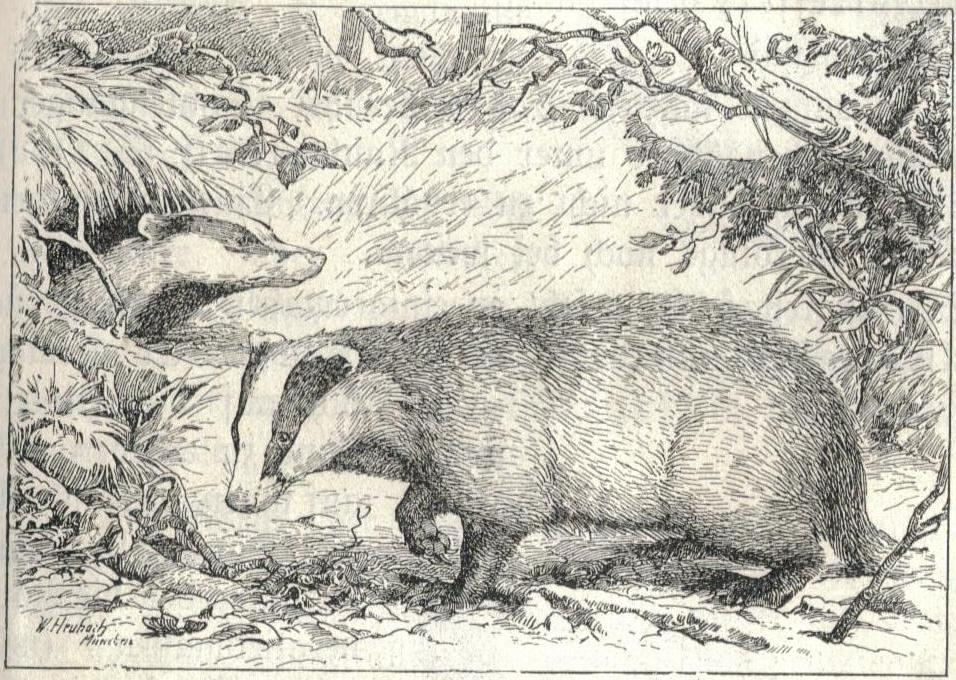
A sett shown in an engraving

Like other badger species, European badgers are burrowing animals. However, the dens they construct, known as 'setts', are the most complex and are passed on from generation to generation. The number of exits in one sett can range from a few to fifty. These setts can be vast and can sometimes accommodate multiple families. Insuch cases, each family occupies its own passages and nesting chambers. Some setts may have exits which are only used in times of danger or play. A typical passage has a 22–63 cm (8.7–24.8 in) wide base and a 14–32 cm (5.5–12.6 in) height. Three sleeping chambers occur in a family unit, some of which are open at both ends. The nesting chamber is located 5–10 m (16–33 ft) from the opening, and is situated more than a 1 m (3 ft 3 in) underground, in some cases 2.3 m (7 ft 7 in). Generally, the passages are 35–81 m (115–266 ft) long. The nesting chamber is on average 74 cm × 76 cm (29 in × 30 in), and are 38 cm (15 in) high.

Badgers collect and dig bedding throughout the year, particularly in spring and autumn. Sett maintenance is usually carried out by subordinate sows and dominant boars. The chambers are frequently lined with bedding, brought in on dry nights. This bedding consists of grass, bracken, straw, leaves and moss. Up to 30 bundles can be carried to the sett in a single night. European badgers are fastidiously clean animals that regularly clear out and discard old bedding. During the winter, they may take their bedding outside on sunny mornings and retrieve it later in the day. Spring cleaning is associated with the birth of cubs and may occur several times during the summer in order to prevent accumulation of parasites.

If a badger dies within the sett, its conspecifics will seal off the chamber and dig a new one. Some badgers drag their dead out of the sett and bury them outside. A sett is almost invariably located near a tree, which the badgers use for stretching or claw scraping. Badgers defecate in latrines located near the sett, as well as at strategic locations on territorial boundaries or near places with abundant food supplies.

In extreme cases, when suitable burrowing grounds are lacking, badgers may move into haystacks in winter. They may share their setts with red foxes or European rabbits. In turn, the badgers may protect the rabbits from other predators. The rabbits usually avoid predation by the badgers by inhabiting smaller, harder-to-reach chambers.

=== Reproduction and development ===
Badger with cubs

The estrus cycle in European badgers lasts four to six days and can occur throughout the year, although there is a peak in spring. Sexual maturity in boars is usually attained at the age of twelve to fifteen months but this can range from nine months to two years. Males are normally fecund during January–May, with spermatogenesis declining in summer. Sows usually begin ovulating in their second year, though some exceptionally begin at nine months. They can mate at any time of the year, though the main peak occurs in February–May, when mature sows are in postpartal estrus and young animals experience their first estrus. Matings occurring outside this period typically occur in sows which either failed to mate earlier in the year or matured slowly. Badgers are usually monogamous; boars typically mate with one female for life, whereas sows have been known to mate with more than one male. Mating lasts for fifteen to sixty minutes, though the pair may briefly copulate for a minute or two when the sow is not in estrus. A delay of two to nine months precedes the fertilized eggs implanting into the wall of the uterus, though matings in December can result in immediate implantation. Ordinarily, implantation happens in December, with a gestation period lasting seven weeks. Cubs are usually born in mid-January to mid-March within underground chambers containing bedding. In areas where the countryside is waterlogged, cubs may be born above ground in buildings. Typically, only dominant sows can breed, as they suppress the reproduction of subordinate females.

The average litter consists of one to five cubs. Although many cubs are sired by resident males, up to 54% can be fathered by boars from different colonies. Dominant sows may kill the cubs of subordinates. Cubs are born pink, with greyish, silvery fur and fused eyelids. Neonatal badgers are 12 cm (4.7 in) in body length on average and weigh 75 to 132 g (2.6 to 4.7 oz), with cubs from large litters being smaller. By three to five days, their claws become pigmented, and individual dark hairs begin to appear. Their eyes open at four to five weeks and their milk teeth erupt about the same time. They emerge from their setts at eight weeks of age, and begin to be weaned at twelve weeks, though they may still suckle until they are four to five months old. Subordinate females assist the mother in guarding, feeding and grooming the cubs. Cubs fully develop their adult coats at six to nine weeks. In areas with medium to high badger populations, dispersal from the natal group is uncommon, though badgers may temporarily visit other colonies. Badgers can live for up to about fifteen years in the wild.

=== Winter sleep ===
Badgers begin to prepare for winter sleep during late summer by accumulating fat reserves, which reach a peak in October. During this period, the sett is cleaned and the nesting chamber is filled with bedding. Upon retiring to sleep, badgers block their sett entrances with dry leaves and earth. They typically stop leaving their setts once snow has fallen. In Russia and the Nordic countries, European badgers retire for winter sleep from late October to mid-November and emerge from their setts in March and early April. In areas such as England and Transcaucasia, where winters are less harsh, badgers either forgo winter sleep entirely or spend long periods underground, emerging in mild spells.

=== Diet ===
European badgers are among some of the least carnivorous members of the order Carnivora. They are highly adaptable and opportunistic omnivores whose diet encompasses a wide range of animals and plants. Their most important food source is earthworms, followed by large insects, carrion, cereals, fruit and small mammals, including rabbits, mice, rats, voles, shrews, moles and hedgehogs. Their insect prey includes chafers, dung and ground beetles, caterpillars, leatherjackets, and the nests of wasps and bumblebees. Badgers can destroy wasp nests, consuming the occupants, combs, and envelope, such as those of Vespula rufa, as their thick skin and pelt protect them from stings. Cereal food includes wheat, oats, maize and occasionally barley. Fruits taken include windfall apples, pears, plums, blackberries, bilberries, raspberries, cherries, strawberries, acorns, beechmast, pignuts and wild arum corms.

Occasionally, badgers feed on medium to large birds, amphibians, fish, small reptiles including tortoises and lizards, snails, slugs, fungi, tubers and green food such as clover and grass, particularly in winter and during droughts. Badgers typically capture large quantities of a single food type in each hunt. They generally do not consume more than 0.5 kg (1.1 lb) of food per day, although young badgers under one year of age eat more than adults. An adult badger weighing 15 kg (33 lb) eats a quantity of food equal to 3.4% of its body weight. Badgers typically eat prey on the spot, and rarely transport it to their setts. Surplus killing has been observed in chicken coops.

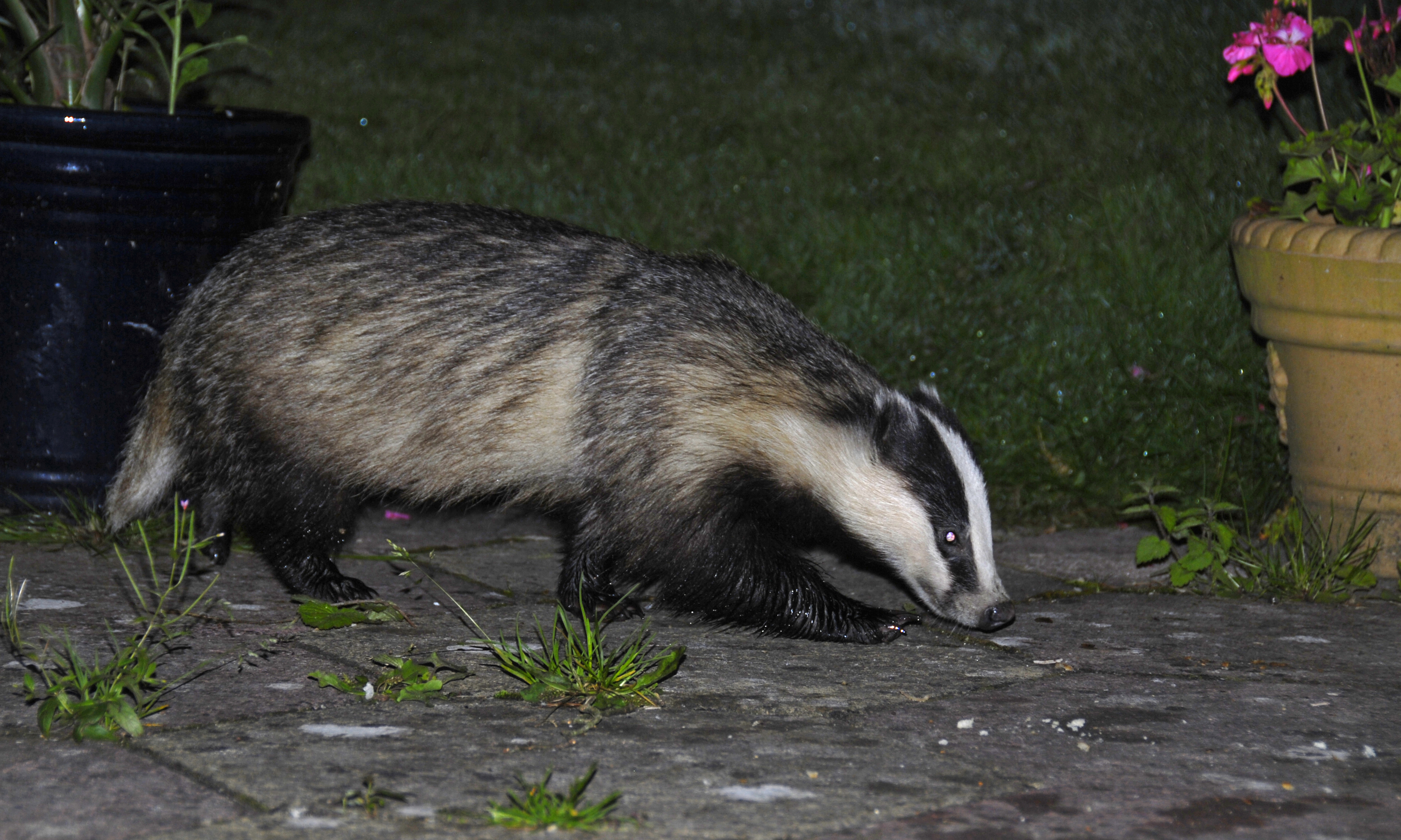
A badger in England scavenging food

Badgers prey on rabbits all year round, particularly when their young are available. They locate the young rabbits in their nests using their sense of smell, then dig downwards to reach them. In mountainous or hilly areas where plant food is scarce, badgers rely on young rabbits as their main food source. Adult rabbits are usually avoided, unless they are wounded or caught in traps. They consume them by turning them inside out and eating the meat, leaving the inverted skin uneaten. Hedgehogs are eaten in a similar manner. In areas where badgers are common, hedgehogs are scarce.

Some rogue badgers may kill lambs, though this is very rare. They may be wrongly implicated in lamb killings when discarded wool and bones are found near their setts. However, foxes, which sometimes live alongside badgers, are often the real culprits, as badgers do not transport food to their setts. They typically kill lambs by biting them behind the shoulder. Poultry and game birds are also taken only rarely. Some badgers may build their setts in proximity to poultry or game farms without ever causing damage. In the rare instances in which badgers kill reared birds, this usually occurs in February–March when food is scarce due to harsh weather and increased badger populations. Badgers can easily breach bee hives with their jaws and are mostly indifferent to bee stings, even when set upon by swarms.

=== Relationships with other non-human predators ===
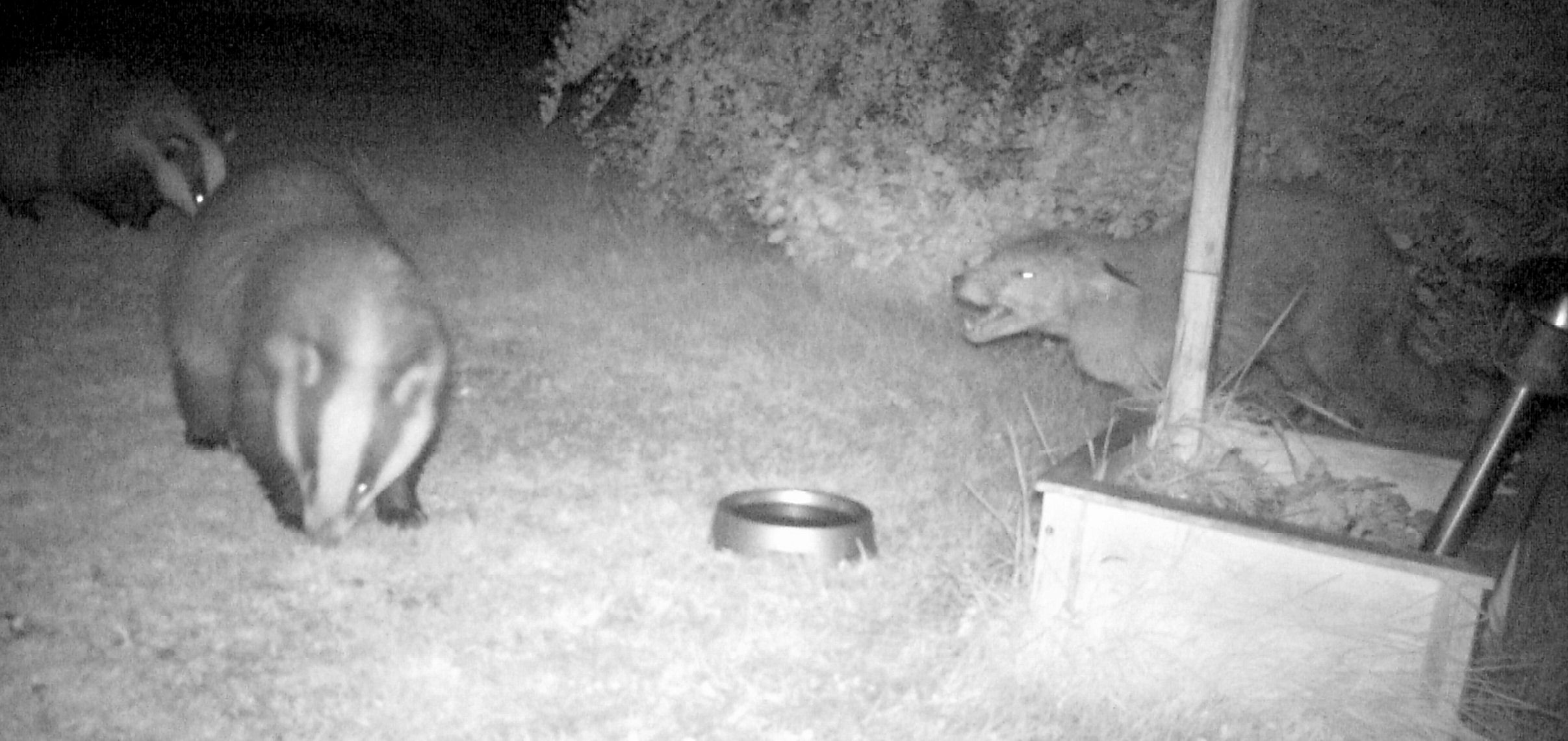
A red fox challenging two badgers moving towards a bird feeder at night

European badgers have few natural enemies. Although they are normally docile, badgers can become extremely aggressive and ferocious when cornered, which makes them dangerous for predators to target. Grey wolves (Canis lupus), Eurasian lynxes (Lynx lynx) and brown bears (Ursus arctos), Europe's three largest remaining land predators, and large domestic dogs (C. familiaris) can pose a threat to adult badgers. However, deaths caused by them are rare as these predators are often limited in population due to human persecution and usually prefer larger, easier prey such as ungulates. Badgers, on the other hand, may fight viciously if they are aware of a predator and are cornered without an escape route. They may live alongside red foxes (Vulpes vulpes) in isolated sections of large burrows. The two species possibly tolerate each other out of commensalism; foxes provide badgers with food scraps, while badgers maintain the shared burrow's cleanliness. However, cases are known of badgers driving vixens from their dens and destroying their litters without eating them. In turn, red foxes are known to have killed badger cubs in spring. Golden eagles (Aquila chrysaetos) are known predators of European badgers and attacks by them on badger cubs are not infrequent, including cases where they have been pulled out directly from below the legs of their mothers, and even adult badgers may be attacked by this eagle species when emerging weak and hungry from hibernation. Eurasian eagle owls (Bubo bubo) may also take an occasional cub and other large raptors such as white-tailed eagles (Haliaeetus albicilla) and greater spotted eagle (Clanga clanga) are considered potential badger cub predators. Raccoon dogs may extensively use badger setts for shelter. There are many known cases of badgers and raccoon dogs wintering in the same hole, possibly because badgers enter hibernation two weeks earlier than the latter, and leave two weeks later. In exceptional cases, badger and raccoon dog cubs may coexist in the same burrow. Badgers may drive out or kill raccoon dogs if they overstay their welcome.

=== Diseases and parasites ===
Bovine tuberculosis (bovine TB) caused by Mycobacterium bovis is a significant factor in badger mortality, although infected badgers can survive and breed successfully for years before succumbing to the disease. The disease was first observed in badgers in Switzerland in 1951 in Switzerland where they were believed to have contracted it from chamois (Rupicapra rupicapra) or roe deer (Capreolus capreolus). It was detected in the United Kingdom in 1971 where it was linked to an outbreak of bovine TB in cows. Evidence suggests that badgers are the primary reservoir of infection for cattle in the southwest of England, Wales and Ireland. Since then there has been considerable controversy as to whether culling badgers will effectively reduce or eliminate bovine TB in cattle.

Badgers are vulnerable to the mustelid herpesvirus-1, as well as rabies and canine distemper, though the latter two are absent in Great Britain. Other diseases found in European badgers include arteriosclerosis, pneumonia, pleurisy, nephritis, enteritis, polyarthritis and lymphosarcoma.

Internal parasites of badgers include trematodes, nematodes and several species of tapeworm. Ectoparasites carried by them include the fleas Paraceras melis (the badger flea), Chaetopsylla trichosa and Pulex irritans (the human flea), the lice Trichodectes melis and the ticks Ixodes ricinus, I. canisuga, I. hexagonus, I. reduvius and I. melicula. They also suffer from mange and spend much time grooming, with individuals concentrating on their own ventral areas and alternating between sides, while social grooming involves one badger grooming another on its dorsal surface. Fleas try to avoid scratching by retreating rapidly downwards and backwards through the fur. This was in contrast to fleas away from their host, which ran upwards and jumped when disturbed. Grooming seems to disadvantage fleas rather than merely having a social function.

== Conservation ==
The International Union for Conservation of Nature rates the European badger as being of least concern. This is because it is a relatively common species with a wide distribution, and its populations are generally stable. In Central Europe, badgers have become more abundant in recent decades due to a reduction in the incidence of rabies. In other areas it has also fared well, with increases in numbers in Western Europe including Great Britain. However, in some areas of intensive agriculture, it has declined due to loss of habitat, and in others it is hunted as a pest.

== Cultural significance ==
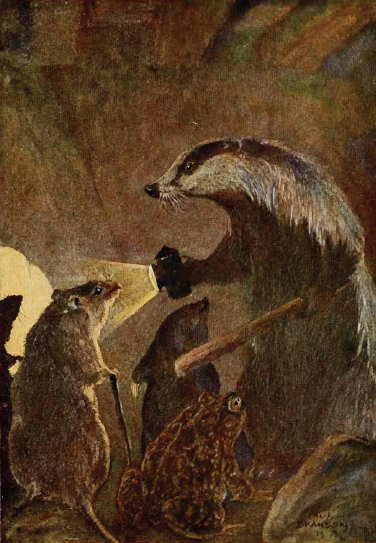
Mr. Badger, as portrayed in an illustrated edition of Kenneth Grahame's The Wind in the Willows

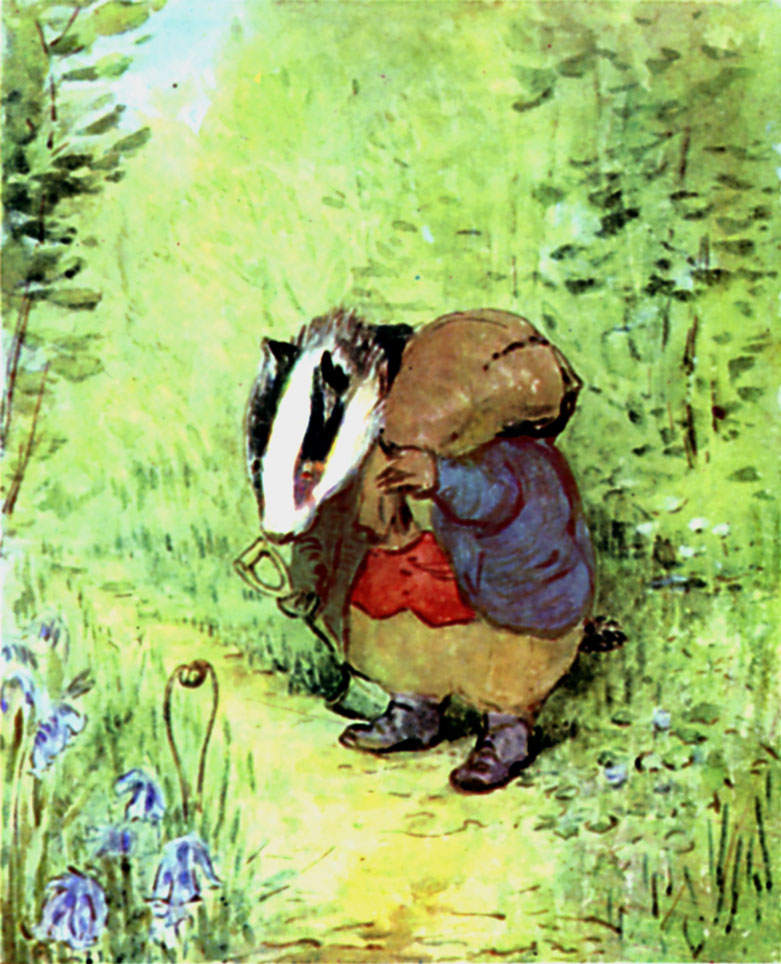
Tommy Brock, as illustrated by Beatrix Potter in The Tale of Mr. Tod

Badgers play a part in European folklore and are featured in modern literature. In Irish mythology, badgers are portrayed as shape-shifters and kinsmen to Tadg, the king of Tara and foster father of Cormac mac Airt. In one story, Tadg berates his adopted son for having killed and prepared some badgers for dinner. In German folklore, the badger is portrayed as a cautious, peace-loving Philistine, who loves more than anything his home, family and comfort, though he can become aggressive if surprised. He is a cousin of Reynard the Fox, whom he uselessly tries to convince to return to the path of righteousness.

In Kenneth Grahame's The Wind in the Willows, Mr. Badger is depicted as a gruff, solitary figure who "simply hates society", yet he is a good friend to Mole and Ratty. As a friend of Toad's late father, he is often firm and serious with Toad, yet generally patient and well-meaning towards him. He can be seen as a wise hermit and a good leader, embodying common sense and gentlemanly behaviour. He is also brave and a skilled fighter, and helps rid Toad Hall of invaders from the wild wood.

The "Frances" series of children's books by Russell and Lillian Hoban depicts an anthropomorphic badger family.

In T. H. White's Arthurian series The Once and Future King, the young King Arthur is transformed into a badger by Merlin as part of his education. He meets with an elderly badger who tells him "I can only teach you two things – to dig, and love your home."

A villainous badger named Tommy Brock appears in Beatrix Potter's 1912 book The Tale of Mr. Tod. He kidnaps the children of Benjamin Bunny and his wife Flopsy, and hides them in an oven at the home of Mr. Tod the fox, whom he fights at the end of the book. The portrayal of the badger as a filthy animal which appropriates fox dens was criticised from a naturalistic viewpoint. However, the inconsistencies are few and are used to create individual characters rather than to depict archetypical foxes and badgers. A wise old badger named Trufflehunter appears in C. S. Lewis' Prince Caspian, where he aids Caspian X in his struggle against King Miraz.

A badger takes a prominent role in Colin Dann's The Animals of Farthing Wood series as second in command to Fox. The badger is also the house symbol for Hufflepuff in the Harry Potter book series. The Redwall series also features the Badger Lords, who rule the extinct volcano fortress of Salamandastron and are renowned as fierce warriors. The children's television series Bodger & Badger was popular on CBBC during the 1990s and was set around the mishaps of a mashed potato-loving badger and his human companion.

The satirical theatre in Zagreb founded in 1964 by Fadil Hadžić was named "Jazavac" after the badger's reputation for cunning as well as Petar Kočić's 1904 satirical play Badger before the Court (Jazavac pred sudom). In the play, an unnamed badger is sued by a local farmer for eating his crops. The play by the Bosnian Serb writer is highly critical towards Austro-Hungarian rule in Bosnia and Herzegovina at the beginning of the 20th century. In honour of Kočić and his badger, the satirical theatre in Banja Luka founded in 2006 is named City Theatre Jazavac.

=== Heraldry ===
European badger in the coat of arms of Luhanka

European badger appears on the coat of arms of the municipality of Luhanka in Central Finland, referring to the former importance of the fur trade in the locality. The badger is also the title animal of the Nurmijärvi municipality in Uusimaa, Finland, where it is a very common mammal.

=== Hunting ===
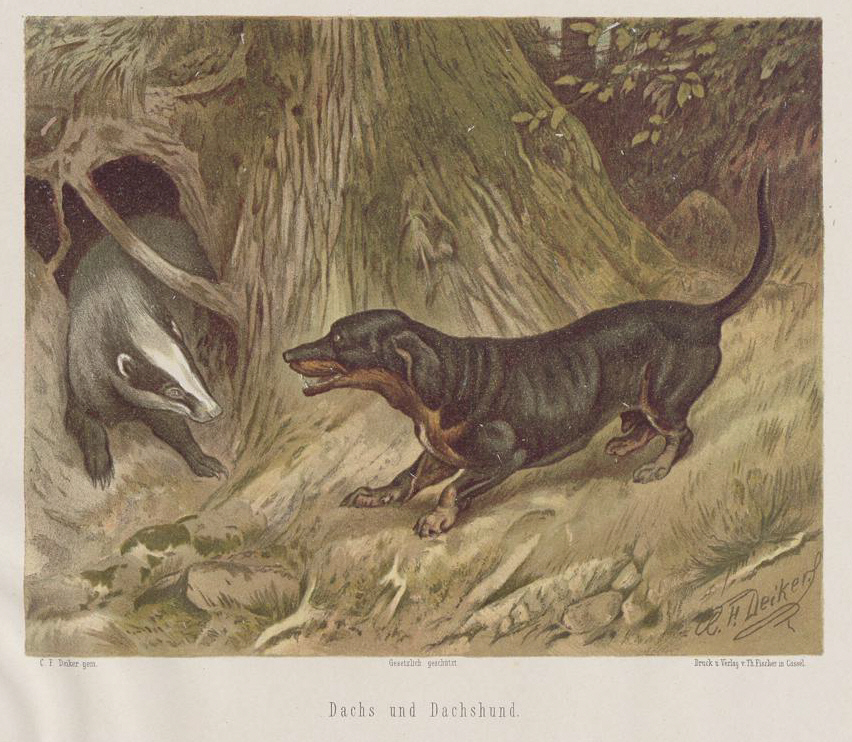
Illustration of a badger brought to bay by a Dachshund (Dachshund is German for "badger-dog")

European badgers are of little significance to the hunting economy, although they may be hunted locally. Methods used to hunt badgers include setting jaw traps, ambushing them at their setts with guns, smoking them out of their burrows, and using specially bred dogs such as Fox Terriers and Dachshunds to dig them out. However, badgers are notoriously durable animals. Their thick, loose skin is covered in long hair for protection, and their heavily ossified skulls allow them to shrug off most blunt traumas and shotgun pellets.

=== Badger-baiting ===
Badger-baiting was once a popular blood sport, in which badgers were captured alive, placed in boxes, and attacked with dogs. In the UK, this was outlawed by the Cruelty to Animals Act 1835 and again by the Protection of Animals Act 1911. Moreover, the cruelty towards badgers and the killing of badgers constitute offences under the Protection of Badgers Act 1992 (c. 51). Further offences under this Act are inevitably committed to facilitate badger-baiting, such as interfering with a sett or taking or possessing a badger for purposes other than nursing an injured animal back to health. If convicted, badger baiting offenders may face a prison sentence of up to six months, a fine of up to £5,000, and other punitive measures, such as community service or a ban on owning dogs.

=== Culling ===
Many badgers in Europe were gassed during the 1960s and 1970s to control rabies. Until the 1980s, badger culling in the United Kingdom was carried out by gassing to control the spread of bovine tuberculosis (bTB). Limited culling resumed in 1998 as part of a 10-year randomized trial cull which was considered by John Krebs and others to show that culling was ineffective. Some groups called for a selective cull, while others favoured a programme of vaccination. Some vets support the cull on compassionate grounds, as they say that the illness causes badgers much suffering. In 2012, the government authorized a limited cull led by the Department for Environment, Food and Rural Affairs (Defra), however, this was later deferred with a wide range of reasons given. In August 2013, a full culling programme began, during which around 5,000 badgers were killed over a period of six weeks in West Somerset and Gloucestershire. Marksmen used high-velocity rifles for the cull, employing a combination of controlled shooting and free shooting techniques (some badgers were first trapped in cages). The cull sparked widespread protests, with people citing emotional, economic and scientific reasons against it. Although the badger is not an endangered species, it is considered an iconic symbol of the British countryside. It was claimed by shadow ministers that "The government's own figures show it will cost more than it saves...", and Lord Krebs, who led the Randomised Badger Culling Trial in the 1990s, said the two pilots "will not yield any useful information". A scientific study of culling from 2013 to 2017 has shown a reduction of 36–55% incidence of bovine tuberculosis in cattle.

=== Tameability ===
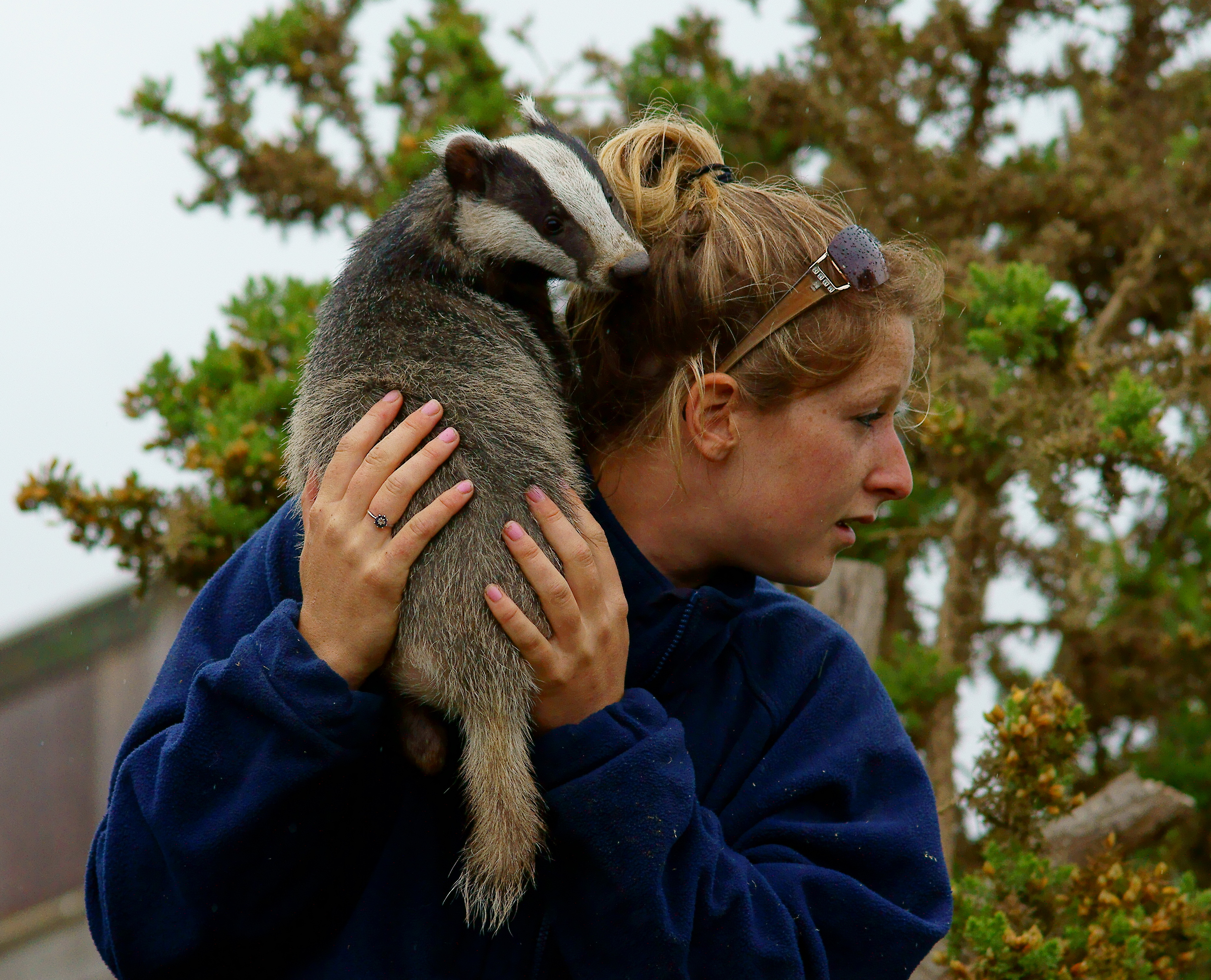
A tame orphan badger with keeper

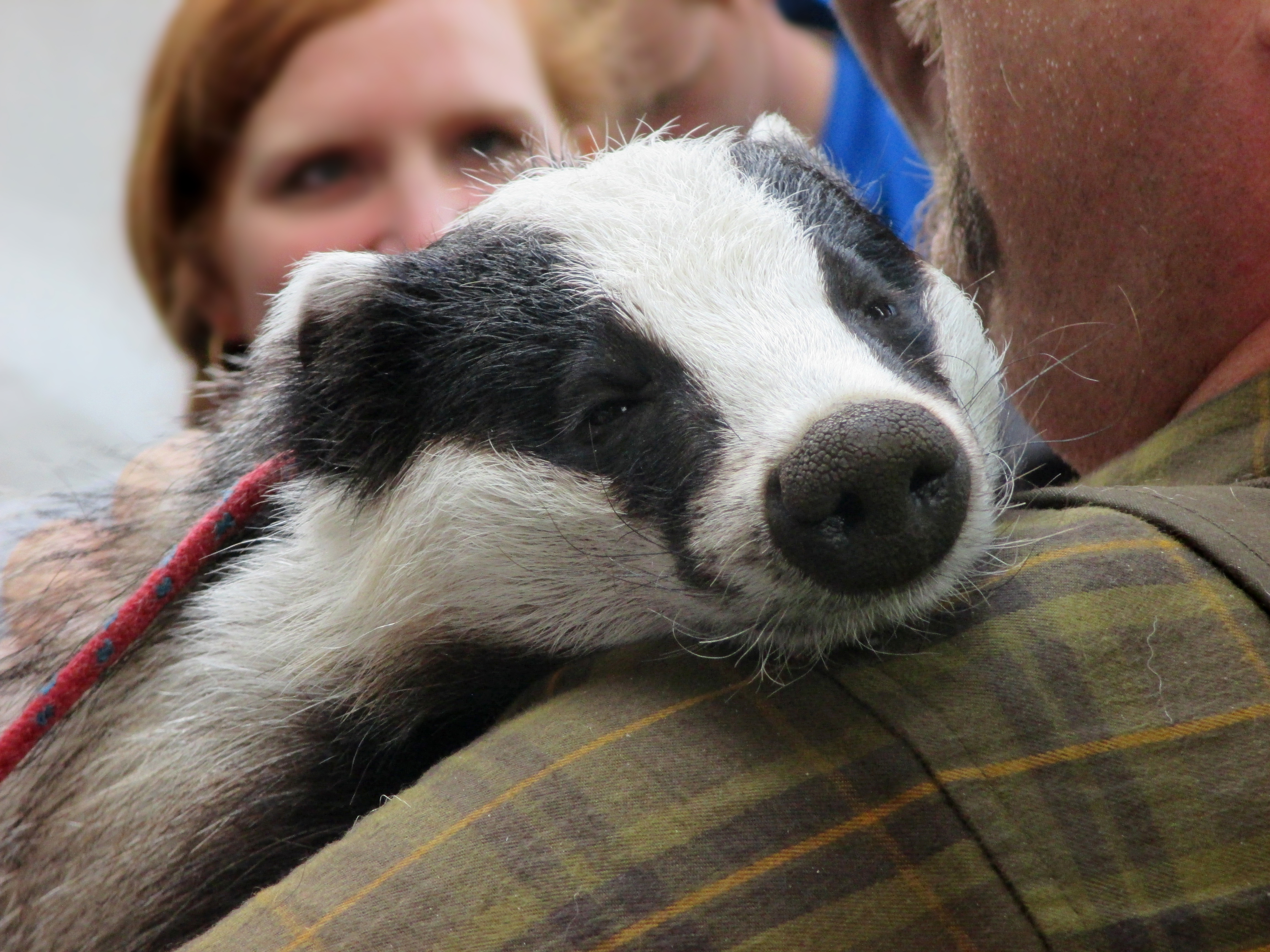
A hand reared European badger shown at the celebration of the National Day of Sweden

There are several accounts of European badgers being tamed. Tame badgers can make affectionate pets, and can be trained to come to their owners when their names are called. They are easy to feed as they are not fussy eaters, and will instinctively unearth rats, moles and young rabbits without training. However, they also have a fondness for pork. While there is one record of a tame badger befriending a fox, badgers do not generally tolerate the presence of cats and dogs and will chase them.

=== Uses ===
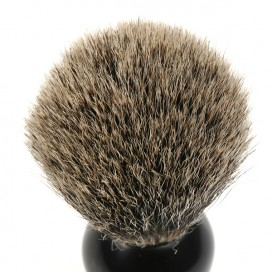
A shaving brush using badger hair

Badger meat is eaten in some districts of the former Soviet Union, though in most cases it is discarded. Smoked hams made from badgers were once highly esteemed in England, Wales and Ireland.

Some badger products have been used for medical purposes; badger expert Ernest Neal, quoting from an 1810 edition of The Sporting Magazine, wrote;

The flesh, blood and grease of the badger are very useful for oils, ointments, salves and powders, for shortness of breath, the cough of the lungs, for the stone, sprained sinews, collachs etc. The skin being well dressed is very warm and comfortable for ancient people who are troubled with paralytic disorders.

The hair of the European badger has been used for centuries for making sporrans (Note: Neal 1976, pp. 152–154) and shaving brushes. Sporrans are traditionally worn as part of male Scottish highland dress. They form a bag or pocket made from a pelt and a badger or other animal's mask may be used as a flap. The pelt was also formerly used for pistol furniture.
