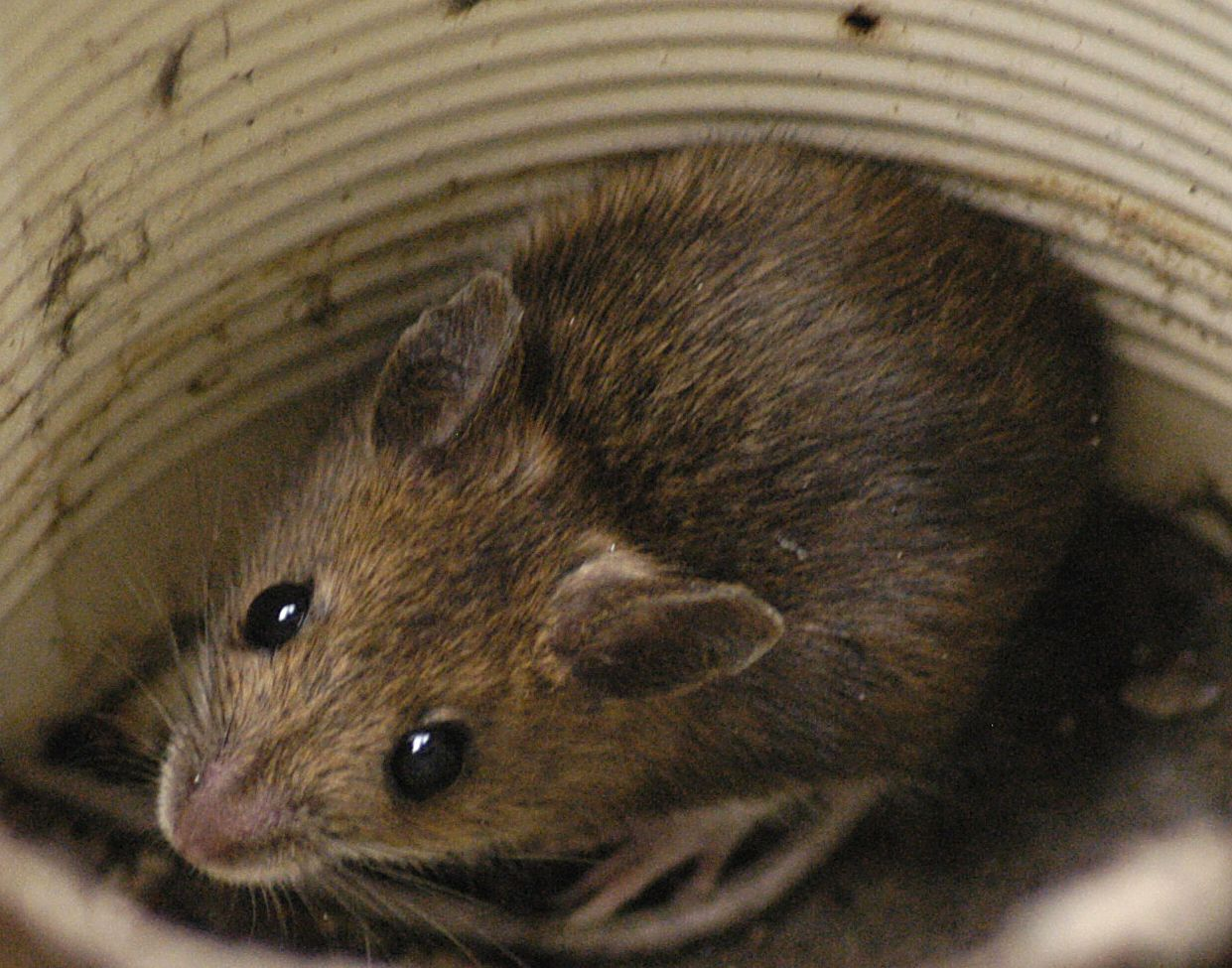
- Wood mouse (Apodemus sylvaticus)

Scientific classification
- Kingdom: Animalia
- Phylum: Chordata
- Class: Mammalia
- Order: Rodentia
- Family: Muridae
- Subfamily: Murinae
- Tribe: Apodemini; Lecompte, 2008

Species
- Apodemus †Rhagamys; Tokudaia

= Apodemini =

Apodemini Temporal range: Late Miocene - present 11–0 Ma

Tribe of rodents

Apodemini is a tribe of muroid rodents in the subfamily Murinae. It contains two extant genera, one found throughout Eurasia and the other endemic to the Ryukyu Islands. Several fossil genera are also known from throughout Eurasia, including one large species (Rhagamys) that persisted on Sardinia and Corsica up until at least the first millennium BC, when it was likely wiped out by human activity.

== Species ==
=== Recent species ===
Species in the tribe include:

- Genus Apodemus - Old World field mice
  - Striped field mouse, Apodemus agrarius
  - Alpine field mouse, Apodemus alpicola
  - Small Japanese field mouse, Apodemus argenteus
  - Chevrier's field mouse, Apodemus chevrieri
  - South China field mouse, Apodemus draco
  - Yellow-necked mouse, Apodemus flavicollis – includes A. arianus
  - Himalayan field mouse, Apodemus gurkha
  - Caucasus field mouse, Apodemus hyrcanicus
  - Sichuan field mouse, Apodemus latronum
  - Pygmy field mouse, Apodemus microps
  - Eastern broad-toothed field mouse, Apodemus mystacinus
  - Western broad-toothed field mouse, Apodemus epimelas
  - Ward's field mouse, Apodemus pallipes
  - Korean field mouse, Apodemus peninsulae
  - Black Sea field mouse, Apodemus ponticus
  - Kashmir field mouse, Apodemus rusiges
  - Taiwan field mouse, Apodemus semotus
  - Large Japanese field mouse, Apodemus speciosus
  - Wood mouse, Apodemus sylvaticus
  - Ural field mouse, Apodemus uralensis
  - Steppe field mouse, Apodemus witherbyi
- Genus Tokudaia - Ryūkyū spiny rats
  - Muennink's spiny rat, Tokudaia muenninki
  - Ryukyu spiny rat, Tokudaia osimensis
  - Tokunoshima spiny rat, Tokudaia tokunoshimensis

=== Fossil genera ===
- Genus †Parapodemus (Miocene to Pleistocene of Eurasia)
  - †Parapodemus coronensis
  - †Parapodemus gaudryi
  - †Parapodemus lugdunensis
  - †Parapodemus meini
- Genus †Progonomys
  - †Progonomys cathalai
  - †Progonomys hispanicus
  - †Progonomys hussaini
  - †Progonomys manolo
  - †Progonomys morganae
  - †Progonomys orientalis
  - †Progonomys woelferi
- Genus †Rhagamys (Late Pleistocene of Sardinia and Corsica)
  - †Hensel's field mouse, Rhagamys orthodon (extinct circa 400 B.C-6th century AD )
- Genus †Rhagapodemus (Miocene to Pleistocene of Europe)
  - †Rhagapodemus vandeweerdi
- Genus †Stephanomys
  - †Stephanomys ramblensis
  - †Stephanomys stadii
  - †Stephanomys progressus
