= List of mammals of Austria =

This list shows the IUCN Red List status of the 81 mammal species occurring in Austria.

Icons which state each species' global IUCN status:
| CR | Critically Endangered | In imminent risk of extinction in the wild |
| EN | Endangered | Facing an extremely high risk of extinction in the wild |
| NT | Near Threatened | Doesn't meet any criteria that would categorise it as risking extinction but likely to in the future |
| LC | Least Concern | No current identifiable risks to this species |

== Order: Rodentia (rodents) ==
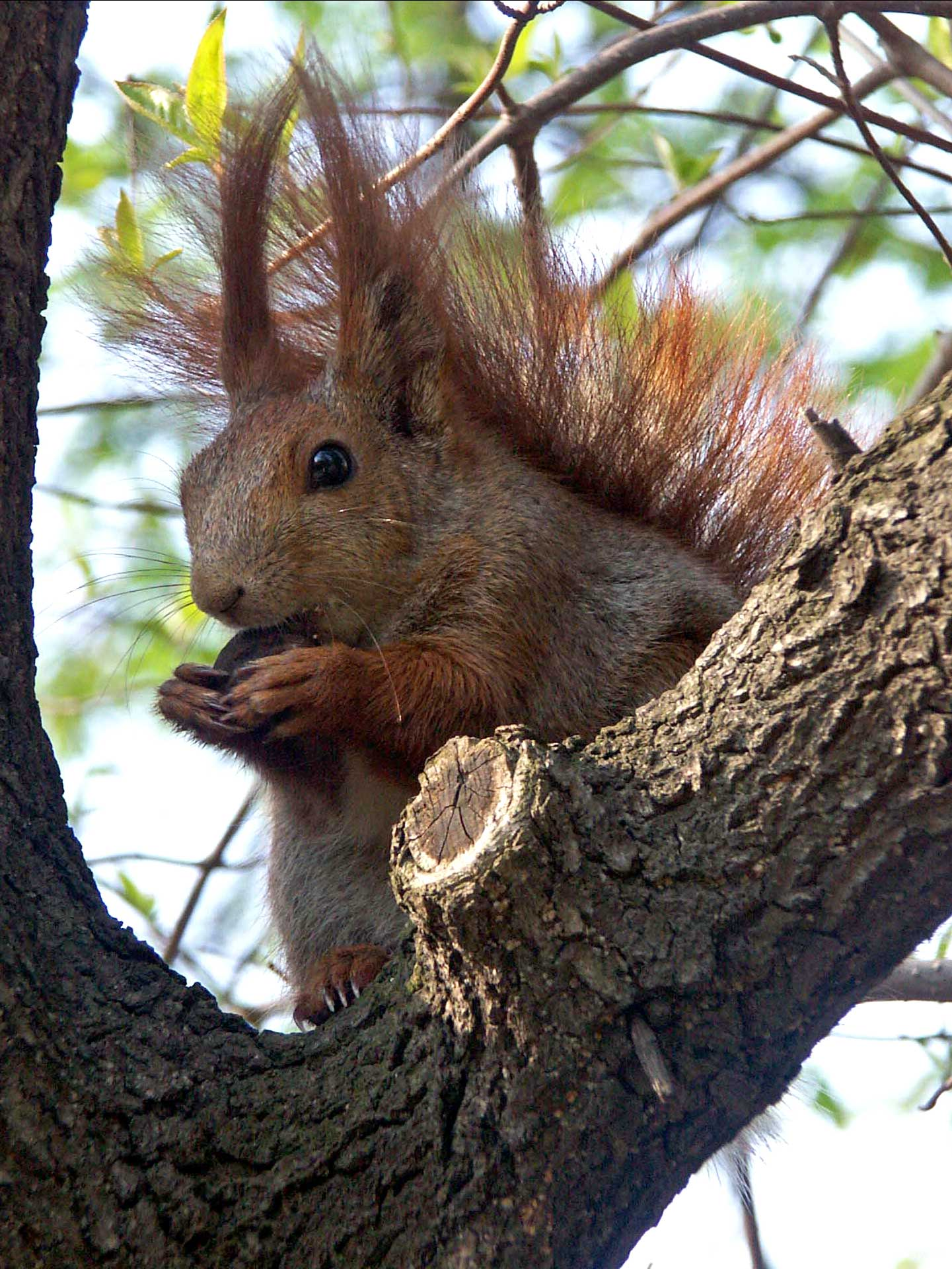
Red squirrel

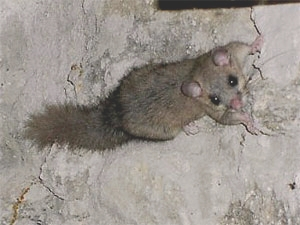
European edible dormouse

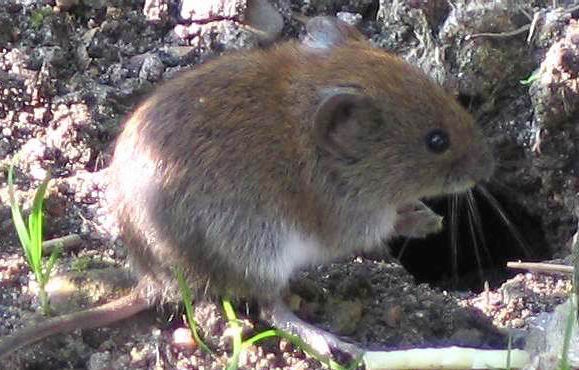
Bank vole

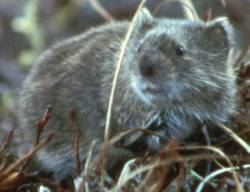
Tundra vole

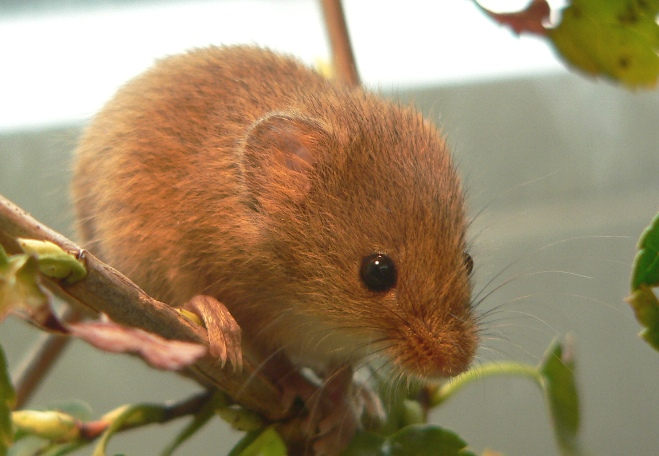
Eurasian harvest mouse

Rodents make up the largest order of mammals, with over 40% of mammalian species. They have two incisors in the upper and lower jaw which grow continually and must be kept short by gnawing.

- Suborder: Sciurognathi
  - Family: Sciuridae (squirrels)
    - Subfamily: Sciurinae
      - Genus: Sciurus
        - Red squirrel, S. vulgaris LC
    - Subfamily: Xerinae
      - Genus: Marmota
        - Alpine marmot, M. marmota LC
      - Genus: Spermophilus
        - European ground squirrel, S. citellus EN
  - Family: Gliridae (dormice)
    - Subfamily: Leithiinae
      - Genus: Dryomys
        - Forest dormouse, Dryomys nitedula LC
      - Genus: Eliomys
        - Garden dormouse, E. quercinus NT
      - Genus: Muscardinus
        - Hazel dormouse, Muscardinus avellanarius LC
    - Subfamily: Glirinae
      - Genus: Glis
        - European edible dormouse, Glis glis LC
  - Family: Dipodidae (jerboas)
    - Subfamily: Sicistinae
      - Genus: Sicista
        - Northern birch mouse, Sicista betulina LC
        - Southern birch mouse, Sicista subtilis LC
  - Family: Cricetidae
    - Subfamily: Cricetinae
      - Genus: Cricetus
        - European hamster, C. cricetus CR
    - Subfamily: Arvicolinae
      - Genus: Arvicola
        - European water vole, A. amphibius LC
      - Genus: Chionomys
        - Snow vole, Chionomys nivalis LC
      - Genus: Clethrionomys
        - Bank vole, Clethrionomys glareolus LC
      - Genus: Microtus
        - Field vole, Microtus agrestis LC
        - Common vole, Microtus arvalis LC
        - Bavarian pine vole, Microtus bavaricus CR
        - Alpine pine vole, Microtus multiplex LC
        - Tundra vole, Microtus oeconomus LC
        - European pine vole, Microtus subterraneus LC
  - Family: Muridae (mice, rats, voles, gerbils, hamsters, etc.)
    - Subfamily: Murinae
      - Genus: Apodemus
        - Striped field mouse, Apodemus agrarius LC
        - Alpine field mouse, Apodemus alpicola LC
        - Yellow-necked mouse, Apodemus flavicollis LC
        - Ural field mouse, Apodemus uralensis LC
      - Genus: Micromys
        - Eurasian harvest mouse, Micromys minutus LC
      - Genus: Mus
        - Steppe mouse, Mus spicilegus LC

== Order: Lagomorpha (lagomorphs) ==
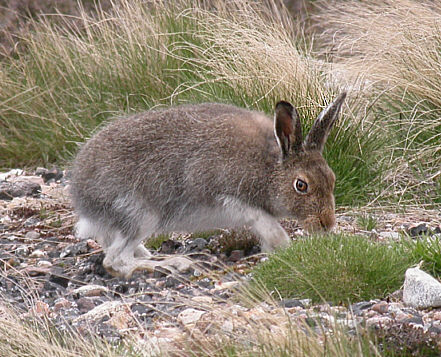
Mountain hare

The lagomorphs comprise two families, Leporidae (hares and rabbits), and Ochotonidae (pikas). Though they can resemble rodents, and were classified as a superfamily in that order until the early 20th century, they have since been considered a separate order. They differ from rodents in a number of physical characteristics, such as having four incisors in the upper jaw rather than two.

- Family: Leporidae (rabbits, hares)
  - Genus: Lepus
    - European hare, L. europaeus LC
    - Mountain hare, L. timidus LC
  - Genus: Oryctolagus
    - European rabbit, O. cuniculus NT introduced

== Order: Eulipotyphla (hedgehogs, shrews and moles) ==
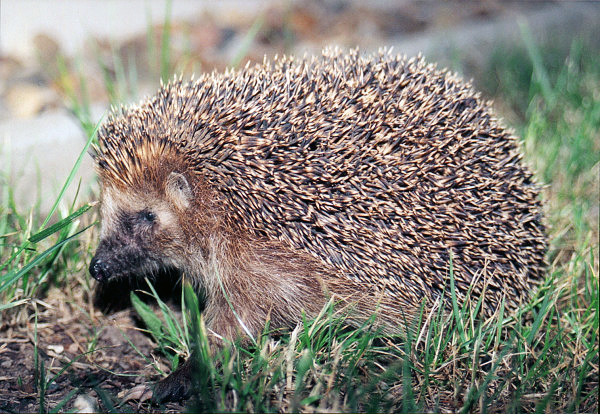
West European hedgehog

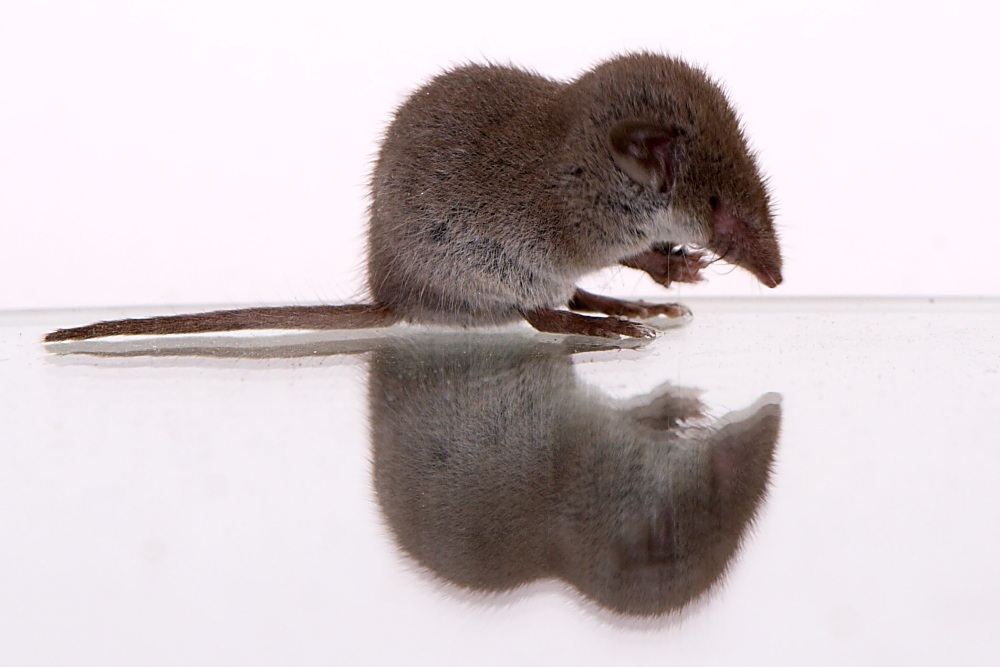
Lesser white-toothed shrew

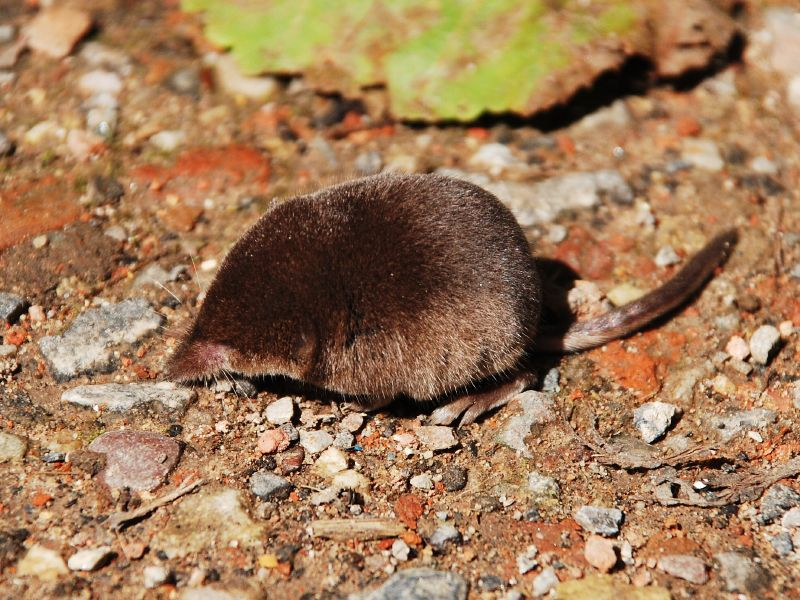
Eurasian pygmy shrew

Hedgehogs are easily recognised by their spines, shrews closely resemble mice, and moles are stout-bodied burrowers.

- Family: Erinaceidae (hedgehogs)
  - Subfamily: Erinaceinae
    - Genus: Erinaceus
      - West European hedgehog, E. europaeus NT
- Family: Soricidae (shrews)
  - Subfamily: Crocidurinae
    - Genus: Crocidura
      - Bicolored shrew, C. leucodon LC
      - Greater white-toothed shrew, C. russula LC
      - Lesser white-toothed shrew, C. suaveolens LC
  - Subfamily: Soricinae
    - Tribe: Nectogalini
      - Genus: Neomys
        - Southern water shrew, N. anomalus LC
        - Eurasian water shrew, N. fodiens LC
    - Tribe: Soricini
      - Genus: Sorex
        - Alpine shrew, S. alpinus NT
        - Common shrew, S. araneus LC
        - Crowned shrew, S. coronatus LC
        - Eurasian pygmy shrew, S. minutus LC
- Family: Talpidae (moles)
  - Subfamily: Talpinae
    - Tribe: Talpini
      - Genus: Talpa
        - European mole, T. europaea LC

== Order: Chiroptera (bats) ==
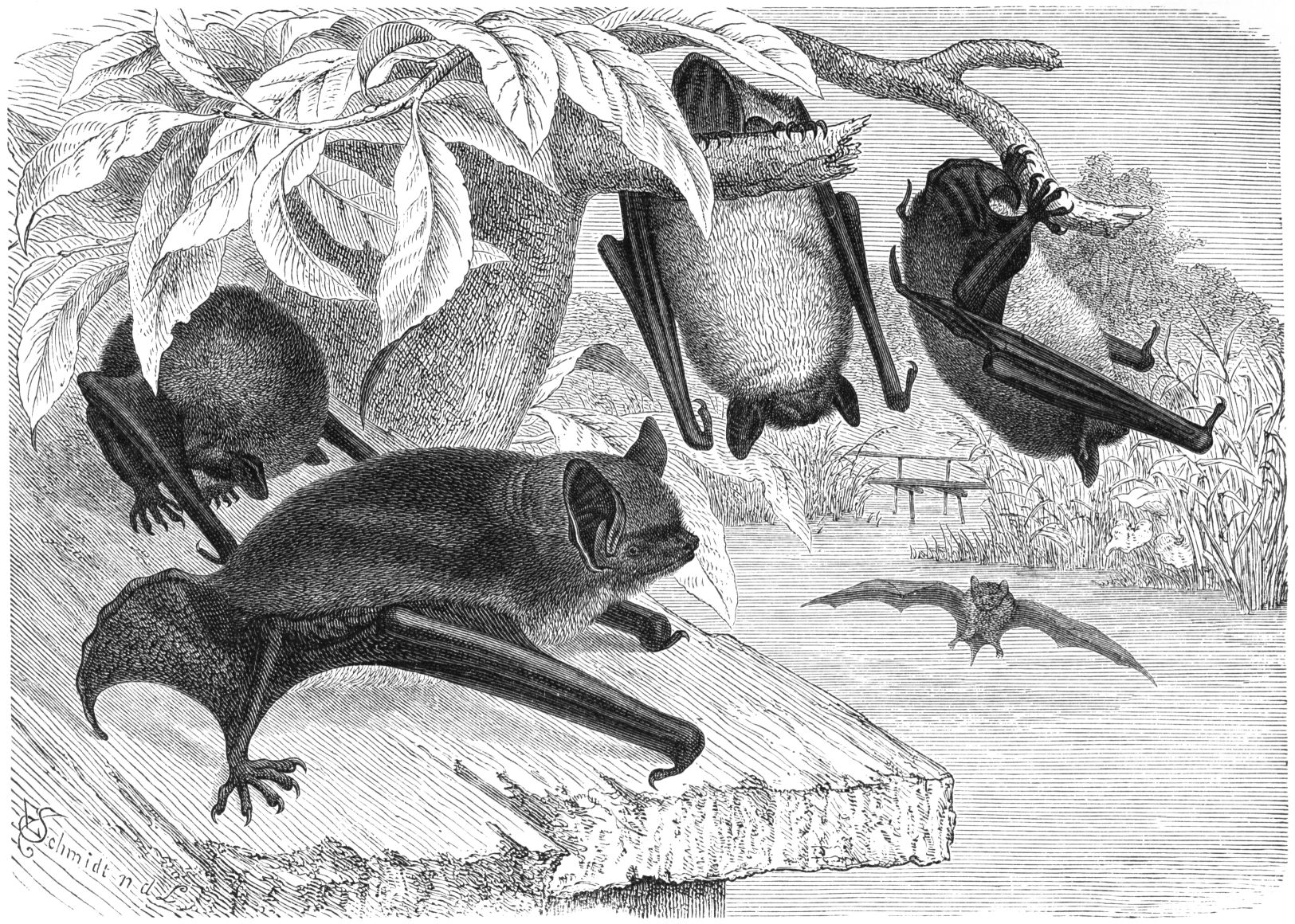
Daubenton's bat

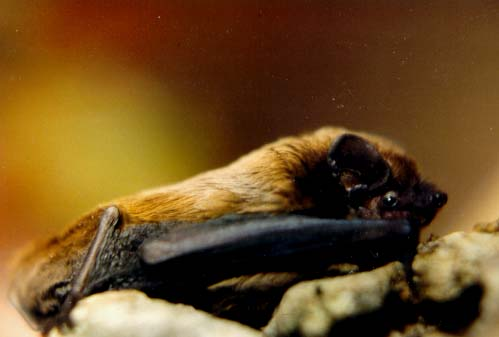
Lesser noctule

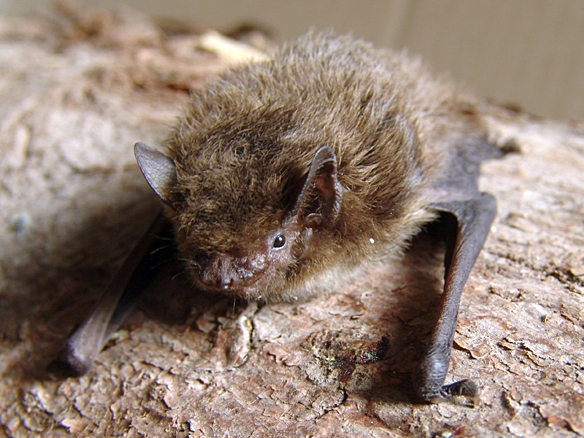
Nathusius' pipistrelle

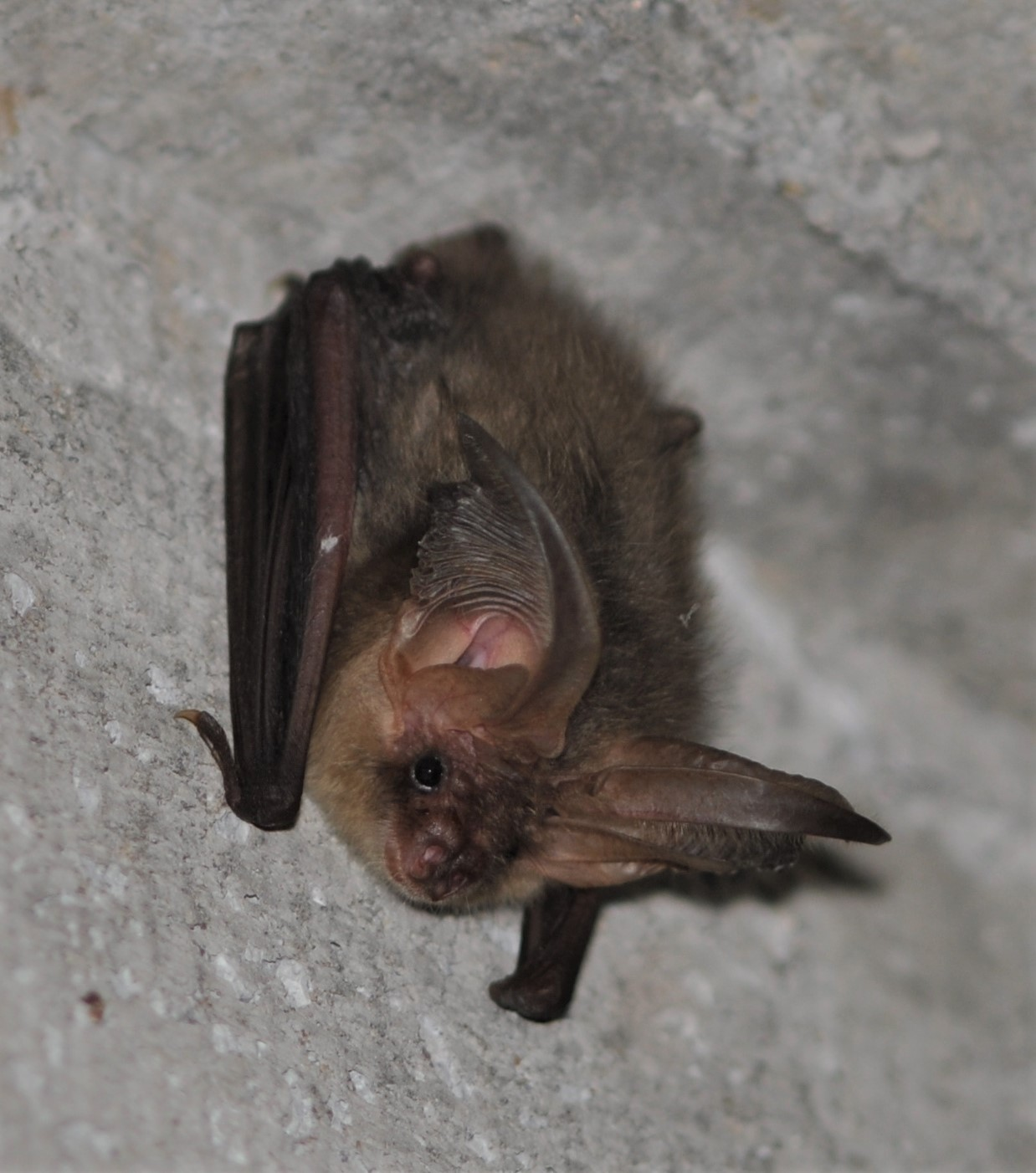
Brown long-eared bat

The bats' most distinguishing feature is that their forelimbs are developed as wings, making them the only mammals capable of flight. Bat species account for about 20% of all mammals.

- Family: Vespertilionidae
  - Subfamily: Myotinae
    - Genus: Myotis
      - Bechstein's bat, M. bechsteini NT
      - Greater mouse-eared bat, M. myotis LC
      - Lesser mouse-eared bat, M. blythii LC
      - Brandt's bat, M. brandti LC
      - Daubenton's bat, M. daubentonii LC
      - Geoffroy's bat, M. emarginatus LC
      - Whiskered bat, M. mystacinus LC
      - Natterer's bat, M. nattereri LC
  - Subfamily: Vespertilioninae
    - Genus: Barbastella
      - Western barbastelle, B. barbastellus NT
    - Genus: Eptesicus
      - Northern bat, E. nilssoni LC
      - Serotine bat, E. serotinus LC
    - Genus: Nyctalus
      - Lesser noctule, N. leisleri LC
      - Common noctule, N. noctula LC
    - Genus: Pipistrellus
      - Nathusius' pipistrelle, P. nathusii LC
      - Kuhl's pipistrelle, P. kuhlii LC
      - Common pipistrelle, P. pipistrellus LC
      - Pygmy pipistrelle, P. pygmaeus LC
    - Genus: Hypsugo
      - Savi's pipistrelle, H. savii LC
    - Genus: Plecotus
      - Brown long-eared bat, P. auritus LC
      - Grey long-eared bat, P. austriacus NT
- Family: Molossidae
  - Genus: Tadarida
    - European free-tailed bat, T. teniotis LC
- Family: Rhinolophidae
  - Subfamily: Rhinolophinae
    - Genus: Rhinolophus
      - Blasius's horseshoe bat, R. blasii LC
      - Greater horseshoe bat, R. ferrumequinum LC
      - Lesser horseshoe bat, R. hipposideros LC

== Order: Carnivora (carnivorans) ==
European jackal (Canis aureus moreotica)

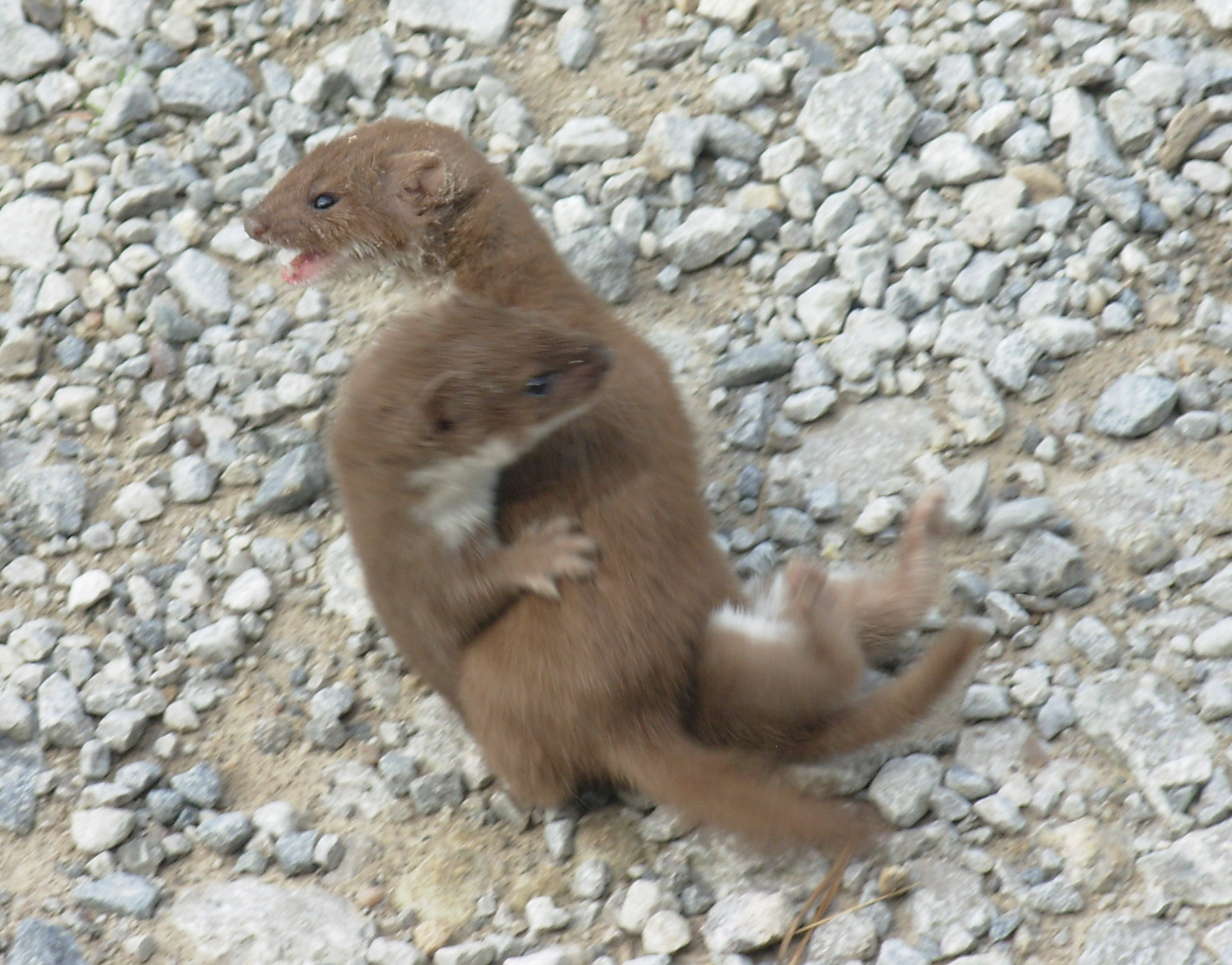
Least weasel

There are over 260 species of carnivorans, the majority of which feed primarily on meat. They have a characteristic skull shape and dentition.

- Family: Felidae (cats)
  - Subfamily: Felinae
    - Genus: Felis
      - European wildcat, F. silvestris LC
    - Genus: Lynx
      - Eurasian lynx, L. lynx LC
- Family: Canidae (dogs, foxes)
  - Genus: Vulpes
    - Red fox, V. vulpes LC
  - Genus: Canis
    - Golden jackal, C. aureus LC
      - European jackal, C. a. moreoticus
    - Gray wolf, C. lupus LC
      - Eurasian wolf, C. l. lupus
- Family: Ursidae (bears)
  - Genus: Ursus
    - Brown bear, U. arctos LC presence uncertain
      - Eurasian brown bear, U. a. arctos presence uncertain
- Family: Mustelidae (mustelids)
  - Genus: Lutra
    - Eurasian otter, L. lutra NT
  - Genus: Martes
    - Beech marten, M. foina LC
    - European pine marten, M. martes LC
  - Genus: Meles
    - European badger, M. meles LC
  - Genus: Mustela
    - Stoat, M. erminea LC
    - Least weasel, M. nivalis LC
    - European polecat, M. putorius LC
  - Genus: Neogale
    - American mink, N. vison LC introduced

== Order: Artiodactyla (even-toed ungulates) ==
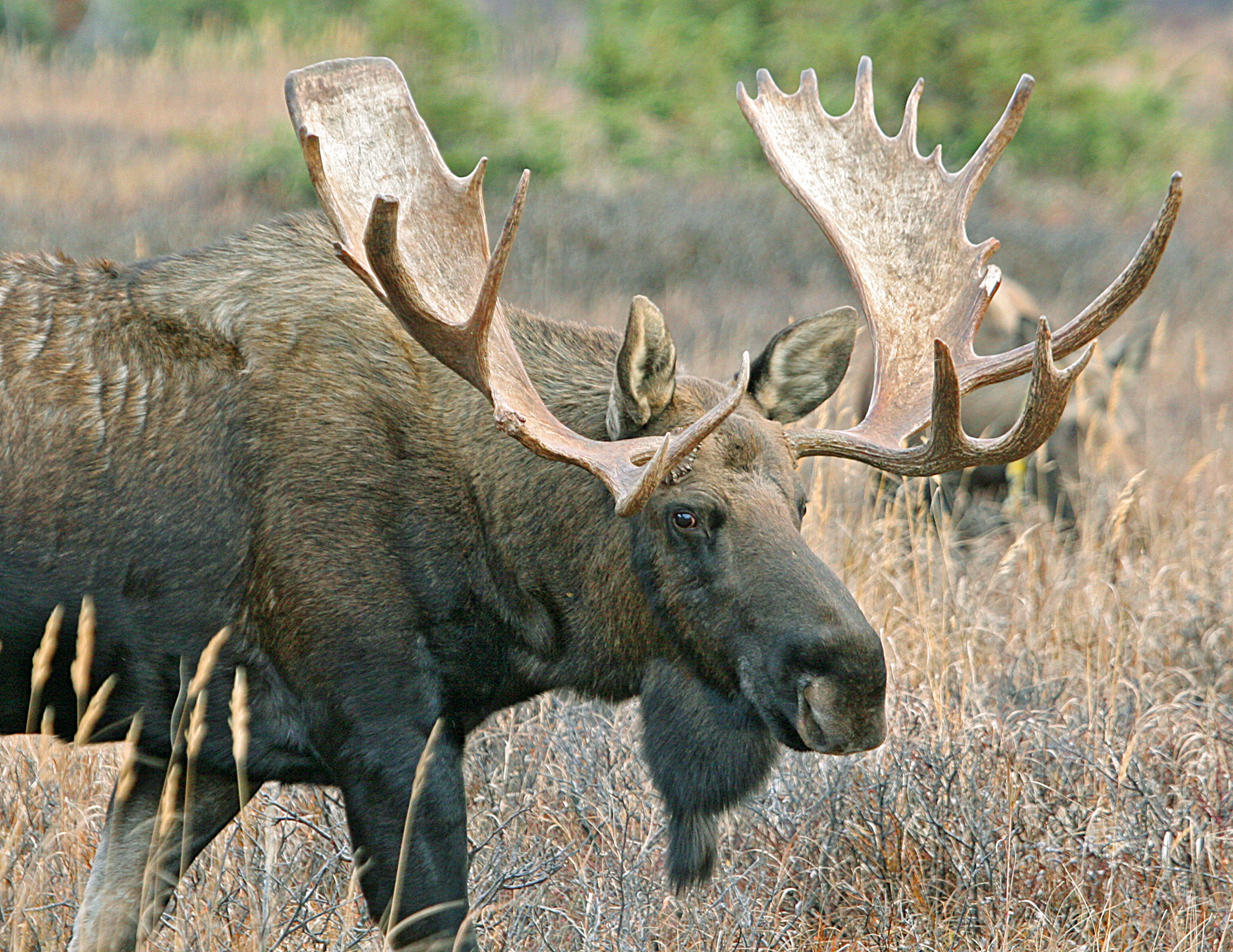
Moose

The even-toed ungulates are ungulates whose weight is borne about equally by the third and fourth toes, rather than mostly or entirely by the third as in perissodactyls. There are about 220 artiodactyl species, including many that are of great economic importance to humans.

- Family: Cervidae (deer)
  - Subfamily: Cervinae
    - Genus: Cervus
      - Red deer, C. elaphus LC
    - Genus: Dama
      - European fallow deer, D. dama LC introduced
  - Subfamily: Capreolinae
    - Genus: Capreolus
      - Roe deer, C. capreolus LC
- Family: Bovidae (cattle, antelope, sheep, goats)
  - Subfamily: Caprinae
    - Genus: Capra
      - Alpine ibex, C. ibex LC reintroduced
    - Genus: Rupicapra
      - Chamois, R. rupicapra LC
- Family: Suidae (pigs)
  - Subfamily: Suinae
    - Genus: Sus
      - Wild boar, S. scrofa LC

== Locally extinct ==
The following species are locally extinct in the country:

- Moose, Alces alces
- European bison, Bison bonasus
- Common bent-wing bat, Miniopterus schreibersii possibly extirpated
- European mink, Mustela lutreola

== See also ==
- List of chordate orders
- Lists of mammals by region
- List of prehistoric mammals
- Mammal classification
- List of mammals described in the 2000s
