= Rhagapodemus =

Rhagapodemus Temporal range: Late Miocene - Mid Pleistocene 5.4–.12 Ma

Scientific classification
- Kingdom: Animalia
- Phylum: Chordata
- Class: Mammalia
- Order: Rodentia
- Family: Muridae
- Tribe: Apodemini
- Genus: †Rhagapodemus; Kretzoi, 1958

Species
- R. debruijni; R. minor; R. primeavus; R. vandeweerdi

Extinct genus of rodent

Rhagapodemus is a genus of extinct rodent from the Miocene to Pleistocene periods. Most species are known from European localities, although R. debruijni comes from India.

== Taxonomy ==
Rhagapodemus was closely related to the field mice of the genus Apodemus. One species, R. minor, is considered ancestral to another extinct genus, Rhagamys, which was endemic to Sardinia and Corsica up until the end of the Pleistocene.
