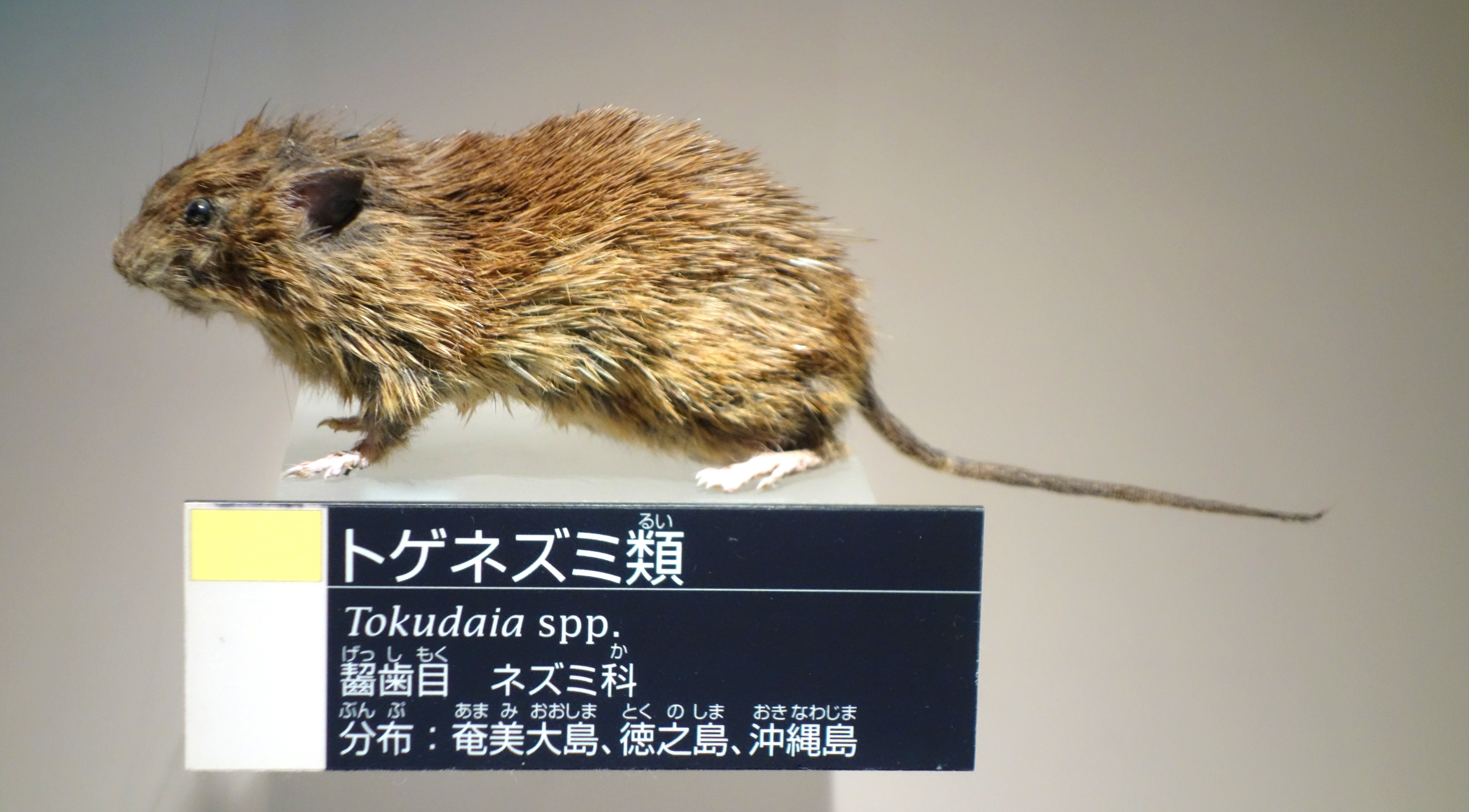

Scientific classification
- Kingdom: Animalia
- Phylum: Chordata
- Class: Mammalia
- Order: Rodentia
- Family: Muridae
- Tribe: Apodemini
- Genus: Tokudaia; Kuroda, 1943

Type species
- Rattus jerdoini osimensis

Species
- See text

= Tokudaia =

Tokudaia Temporal range: Late Pleistocene to Recent

Genus of rodents

Tokudaia is a genus of murine rodent native to Japan. Known as Ryūkyū spiny rats or spinous country-rats, population groups exist on several non-contiguous islands. Despite differences in name and appearance, they are the closest living relatives of the Eurasian field mouse (Apodemus). Of the three species, both T. osimensis and T. tokunoshimensis have lost their Y chromosome and SRY gene; the sex chromosomes of T. muenninki, on the other hand, are abnormally large.

Named species are:

- Muennink's spiny rat, Tokudaia muenninki
- Ryukyu spiny rat, Tokudaia osimensis
- Tokunoshima spiny rat, Tokudaia tokunoshimensis

At least Tokudaia osimensis may be a cryptic species complex.

== See also ==
- Ellobius
