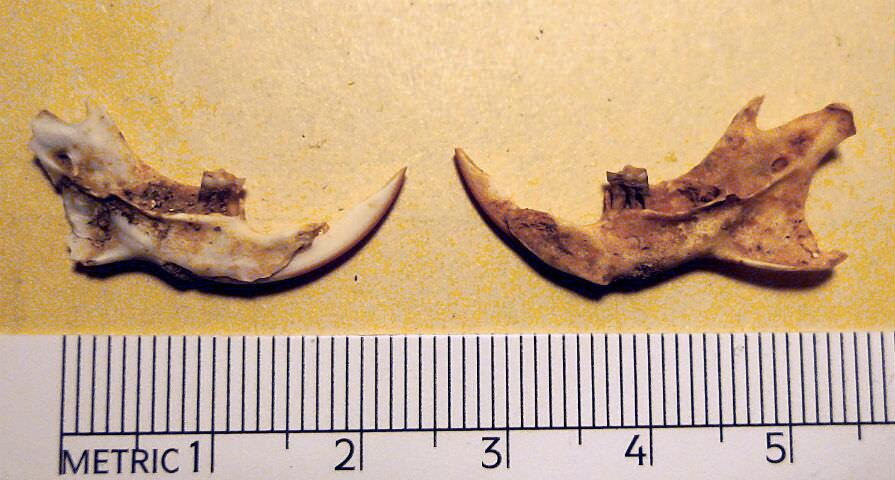

Scientific classification
- Kingdom: Animalia
- Phylum: Chordata
- Class: Mammalia
- Infraclass: Placentalia
- Order: Rodentia
- Family: Muridae
- Tribe: Apodemini
- Genus: †Rhagamys; Major, 1905
- Species: †R. orthodon

Binomial name
- †Rhagamys orthodon (Hensel, 1856)

= Rhagamys =

Rhagamys Temporal range: Pleistocene–Holocene

Extinct rodent genus

Rhagamys is an extinct genus of rodents in the subfamily Murinae, the Old World mice and rats. The genus was established by the Swiss zoologist Charles Immanuel Forsyth Major to accommodate Rhagamys orthodon, which is the only species in the genus. It was endemic to the Mediterranean islands of Corsica and Sardinia, descending from Rhagapodemus, which had colonised the islands around 3.6 million years ago. Its closest living relatives are of the genus Apodemus, which includes the field and wood mice.

== Taxonomy and evolution ==
The ancestors of Rhagamys, belonging the widespread genus Rhagapodemus, first arrived in Corsica-Sardinia during the Early-Late Pliocene transition, around 3.6 million years ago. Three chronospecies of the lineage have been named, including "Rhagapodemus" azzarolii from the earliest Late Pliocene, followed by "Rhagapodemus" minor from the Early Pleistocene, succeeded by Rhagamys orthodon, which ranged from the Middle Pleistocene to Holocene. The molars of Rhagamys are similar to those of the wood mouse (Apodemus sylvaticus) and the striped field mouse (Apodemus agrarius) but are larger and more derived, being hypsodont teeth suitable for feeding on a coarse, abrasive diet. Over time, The Rhagapodemus-Rhagamys lineage increased in size, with Rhagamys orthodon having an estimated mass of approximately 90 grams (3.2 oz), two and a half times larger than its mainland ancestor, an example of island gigantism.

== Paleoenvironment and extinction ==
Before the arrival of humans on the islands in about 8000 BC, Corsica and Sardinia had their own highly endemic depauperate terrestrial mammal fauna which besides Rhagamys orthodon included a species of dwarf mammoth (Mammuthus lamarmorai), the Tyrrhenian vole (Microtus henseli), the Sardinian pika (Prolagus sardus), the shrew Asoriculus similis, a mole (Talpa tyrrhenica), the Sardinian dhole (Cynotherium sardous), a galictine mustelid (Enhydrictis galictoides), three species of otter (Algarolutra majori, Sardolutra ichnusae, Megalenhydris barbaricina) and a deer (Praemegaceros cazioti). The small mammals, including Rhagamys, persisted for many thousands of years after the first human arrival on the islands, with the youngest radiocarbon date for Rhagamys on Sardinia being around 822-776 BC, while on Corsica the youngest dates for the species are around 393 BC. It was almost certainly extinct by the 6th century AD. The cause of the extinction is unknown, but may be due to invasive species introduced by new arrivals to the islands such as Carthaginians and the Romans.

The only endemic mammal still found on the islands is the Sardinian long-eared bat (Plecotus sardus).
