= Apodemus gorafensis =

Apodemus gorafensis Temporal range: Miocene–Pliocene

Scientific classification
- Kingdom: Animalia
- Phylum: Chordata
- Class: Mammalia
- Infraclass: Placentalia
- Order: Rodentia
- Family: Muridae
- Genus: Apodemus
- Species: A. gorafensis

Binomial name
- Apodemus gorafensis Ruiz Bustos et al., 1984

Extinct species of rodents

Apodemus gorafensis is an extinct species of murid rodent in the genus Apodemus that lived in Europe and Anatolia during the Neogene period.

== Distribution ==
A. gorafensis is known from fossils found in Spain, Greece, and Turkey.
