= Apodemus avicennicus =

Scientific classification
- Kingdom: Animalia
- Phylum: Chordata
- Class: Mammalia
- Order: Rodentia
- Family: Muridae
- Genus: Apodemus
- Species: A. avicennicus

Binomial name
- Apodemus avicennicus Darvish, Javidkar & Siahsarvie, 2006

Species of rodent

Apodemus avicennicus is a species of rodent found in Iran.
