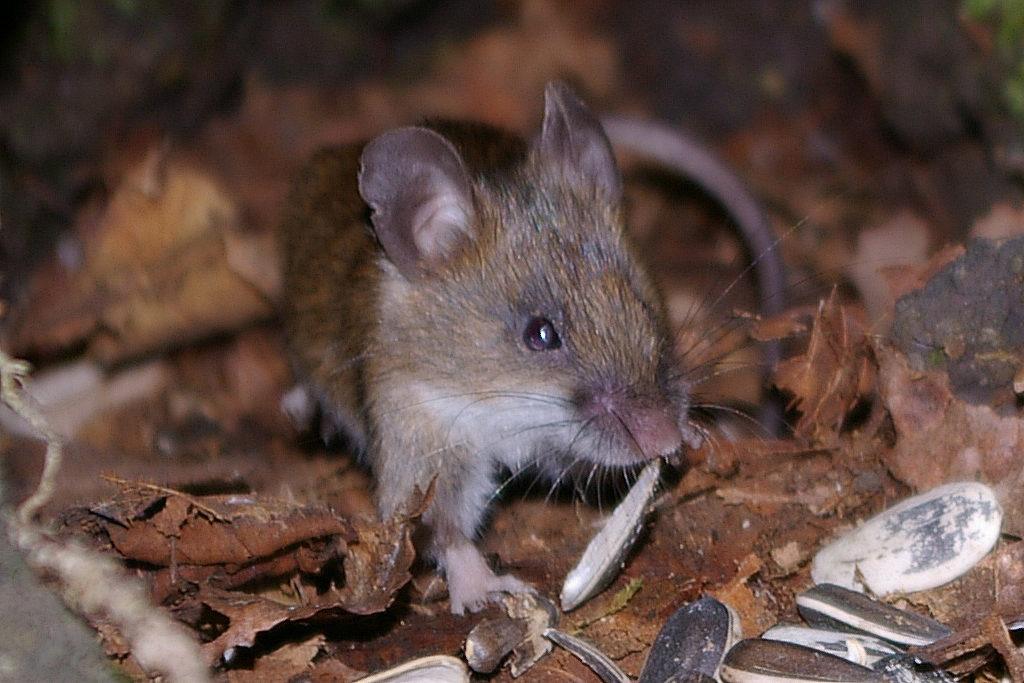

Conservation status
- Least Concern (IUCN 3.1)

Scientific classification
- Kingdom: Animalia
- Phylum: Chordata
- Class: Mammalia
- Order: Rodentia
- Family: Muridae
- Genus: Apodemus
- Species: A. argenteus

Binomial name
- Apodemus argenteus (Temminck, 1844)

= Small Japanese field mouse =

Species of rodent

The small Japanese field mouse (Apodemus argenteus) is a species of rodent in the family Muridae. It is endemic to Japan, spanning from Hokkaido to Kyushu and is similar to its larger counterpart, Apodemus speciosus.

== Anatomy ==
The body length is 65–100mm, tail 70–110mm, weight 10–20g. Although it is similar to a large Japanese field mouse, the small mice have slightly longer tails then the body, opposite to the large mice.
