= Stephanomys =

Stephanomys Temporal range: Neogene–Quaternary

Scientific classification
- Kingdom: Animalia
- Phylum: Chordata
- Class: Mammalia
- Order: Rodentia
- Family: Muridae
- Subfamily: Murinae
- Tribe: Apodemini
- Genus: †Stephanomys; Schaub, 1938

Extinct genus of rodents

Stephanomys is an extinct genus of murid rodent that inhabited Eurasia during the Neogene and Quaternary periods.

== Distribution ==
The species S. minor lived in Spain during the Late Pliocene.
