= Kashmir field mouse =

Conservation status
- Least Concern (IUCN 3.1)

Scientific classification
- Kingdom: Animalia
- Phylum: Chordata
- Class: Mammalia
- Order: Rodentia
- Family: Muridae
- Genus: Apodemus
- Species: A. rusiges

Binomial name
- Apodemus rusiges Miller, 1913

Species of rodent

The Kashmir field mouse (Apodemus rusiges) is a species of rodent in the family Muridae. It is found in India, Nepal, and Pakistan.

== Behaviour ==
Kashmir field mouse are nocturnal, terrestrial, and excellent climbers. They make grass-lined nests inside of burrows dug beneath tree roots, where they spend the day resting or taking care of their young. Even though many mice share the same burrow, the female does not allow the males to enter the burrow. They are herbivore, feeding mainly on seeds and berries, it also stores food for the winter season.

== Description ==
The Kashmir mouse is very similar to the Himalayan mouse (A. pallipes), but larger in size, with a larger skull and a longer bicolour tail (80-114% of head-body length, average 95%). The back is dark brownish grey, sometimes with a median dorsal stripe, and the peritoneum is greyish white. Some individual have a longitudinal yellow hairline on the chest and throat. Females have three pairs of mammae.

== Breeding ==
The Kashmir mouse breeds in spring and summer. Females produce four or five litters per year, with an average of five to six youngs per litter. The gestation period is 25-26 days. Cubs are born blind and naked and become sexually mature at 12-14 weeks of age.
