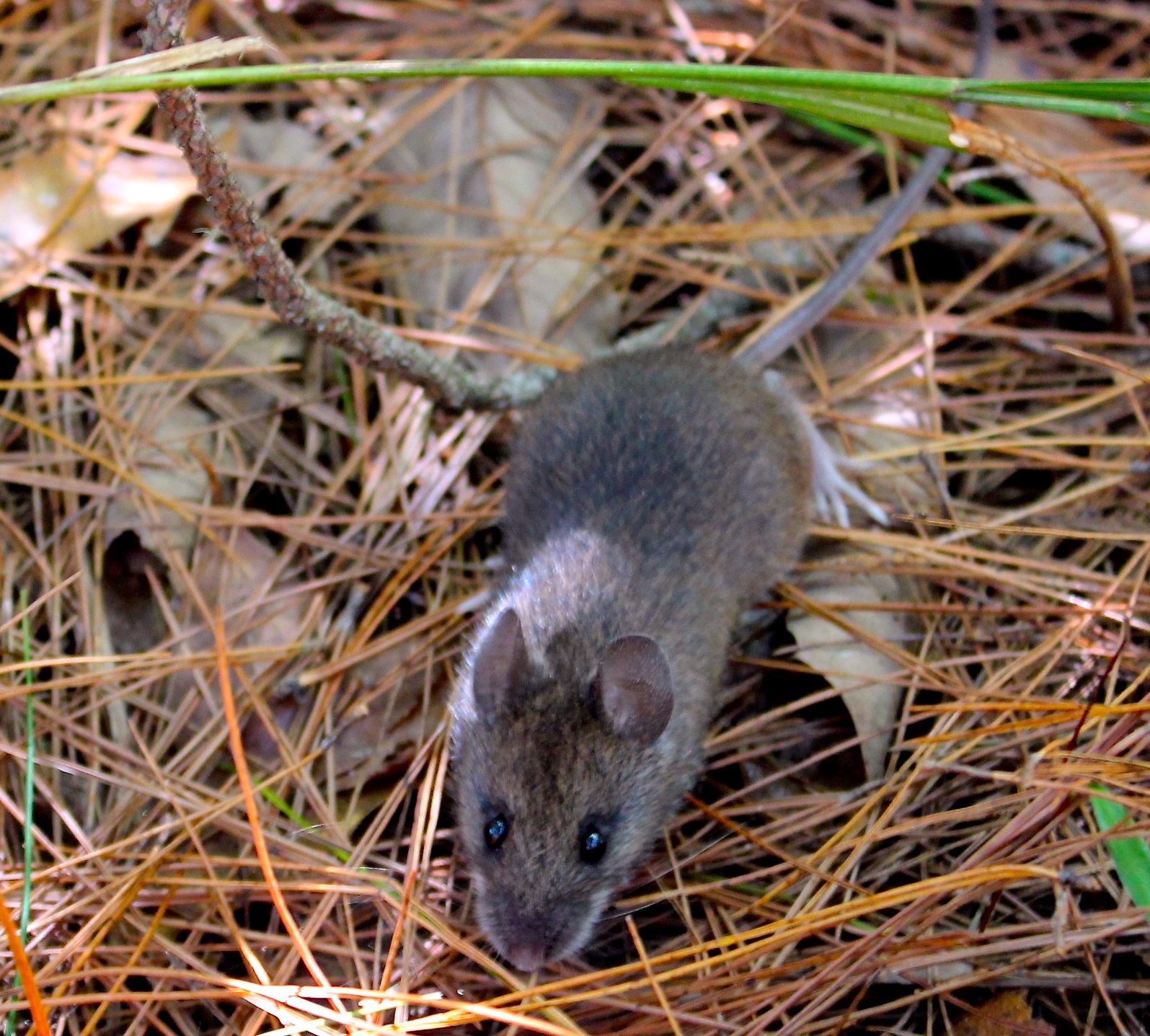

Conservation status
- Least Concern (IUCN 3.1)

Scientific classification
- Kingdom: Animalia
- Phylum: Chordata
- Class: Mammalia
- Order: Rodentia
- Family: Muridae
- Genus: Apodemus
- Species: A. semotus

Binomial name
- Apodemus semotus Thomas, 1908

= Taiwan field mouse =

Species of rodent in the family Muridae found only in Taiwan

The Taiwan field mouse, also called Formosan wood mouse (Apodemus semotus), is a species of rodent in the family Muridae. It is found only in Taiwan.

The Taiwan field mouse is primarily distributed in the montane region between 1,400 and 3,000 m. They inhabit various habitat types, such as natural or planted forests, grasslands, farms, and campsites, and are omnivorous feeding on plants, insects and fungi.

Based on morphological measurements, it has been suggested that the Taiwan field mouse is not different from the South China field mouse (Apodemus draco), and should not be considered as a separate species.

The Taiwan field mouse is sexually dimorphic, with male generally larger than females (male: 25.6 ± 0.5 g; female: 23.8 ± 0.5 g). Mark-capture-recapture data suggest that their life span may be less than 1 year in the wild.
