= Chevrier's field mouse =

Conservation status
- Least Concern (IUCN 3.1)

Scientific classification
- Kingdom: Animalia
- Phylum: Chordata
- Class: Mammalia
- Order: Rodentia
- Family: Muridae
- Genus: Apodemus
- Species: A. chevrieri

Binomial name
- Apodemus chevrieri (Milne-Edwards, 1868)

Species of rodent

Chevrier's field mouse (Apodemus chevrieri) is a species of rodent in the family Muridae. It is found only in China.
