= Sichuan field mouse =

Conservation status
- Least Concern (IUCN 3.1)

Scientific classification
- Domain: Eukaryota
- Kingdom: Animalia
- Phylum: Chordata
- Class: Mammalia
- Order: Rodentia
- Family: Muridae
- Genus: Apodemus
- Species: A. latronum

Binomial name
- Apodemus latronum Thomas, 1911
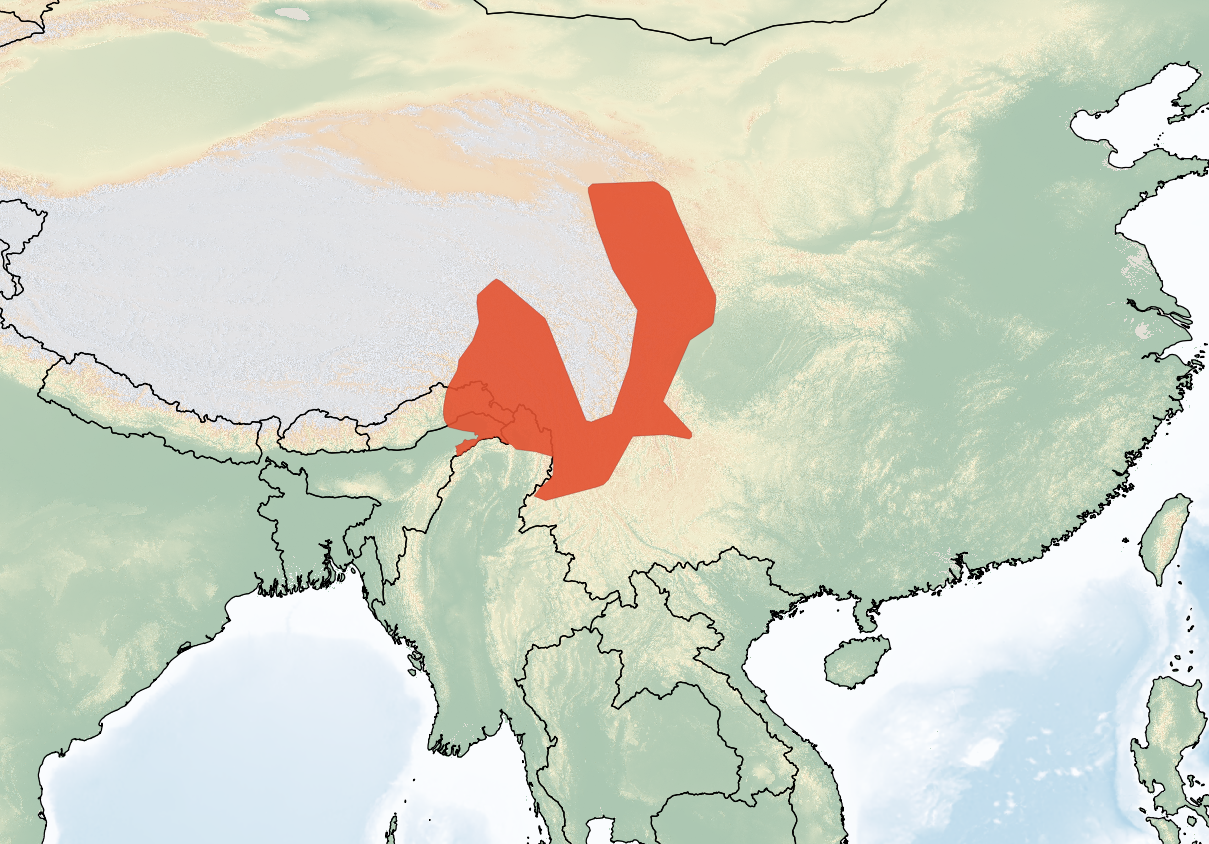

Species of rodent

The Sichuan field mouse (Apodemus latronum) is a species of rodent in the family Muridae. It is found in Qinghai and Sichuan provinces of China, and in India and Burma.
