= Caucasus field mouse =

Conservation status
- Near Threatened (IUCN 3.1)

Scientific classification
- Kingdom: Animalia
- Phylum: Chordata
- Class: Mammalia
- Order: Rodentia
- Family: Muridae
- Genus: Apodemus
- Species: A. hyrcanicus

Binomial name
- Apodemus hyrcanicus Vorontsov, Boyeskorov & Mezhzherin, 1992

Species of rodent

The Caucasus field mouse (Apodemus hyrcanicus) is a species of rodent in the family Muridae.

It is found in Talysh region in SE Azerbaijan, northern Iran and possibly SW Turkmenistan.
