= Western broad-toothed field mouse =

Conservation status
- Least Concern (IUCN 3.1)

Scientific classification
- Domain: Eukaryota
- Kingdom: Animalia
- Phylum: Chordata
- Class: Mammalia
- Order: Rodentia
- Family: Muridae
- Genus: Apodemus
- Species: A. epimelas

Binomial name
- Apodemus epimelas (Nehring, 1902)

Species of rodent

The western broad-toothed field mouse (Apodemus epimelas) is a species of rodent in the genus Apodemus from southeastern Europe. It is related to A. mystacinus, which occurs further to the east. It is found in Albania, Bosnia and Herzegovina, Bulgaria, Croatia, Greece, Kosovo, Montenegro, North Macedonia and Serbia.
