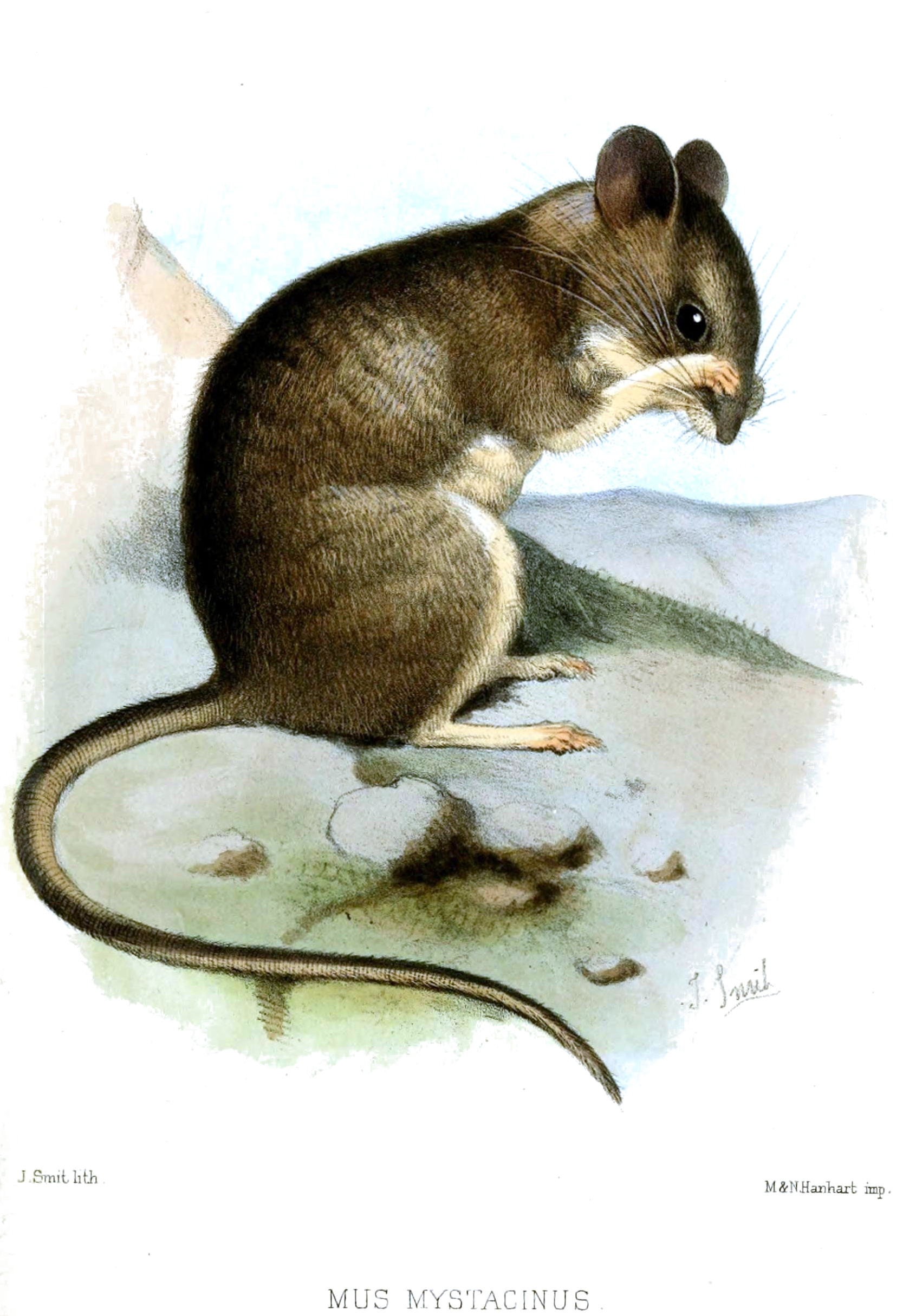

Conservation status
- Least Concern (IUCN 3.1)

Scientific classification
- Kingdom: Animalia
- Phylum: Chordata
- Class: Mammalia
- Order: Rodentia
- Family: Muridae
- Genus: Apodemus
- Species: A. mystacinus

Binomial name
- Apodemus mystacinus (Danford & Alston, 1877)
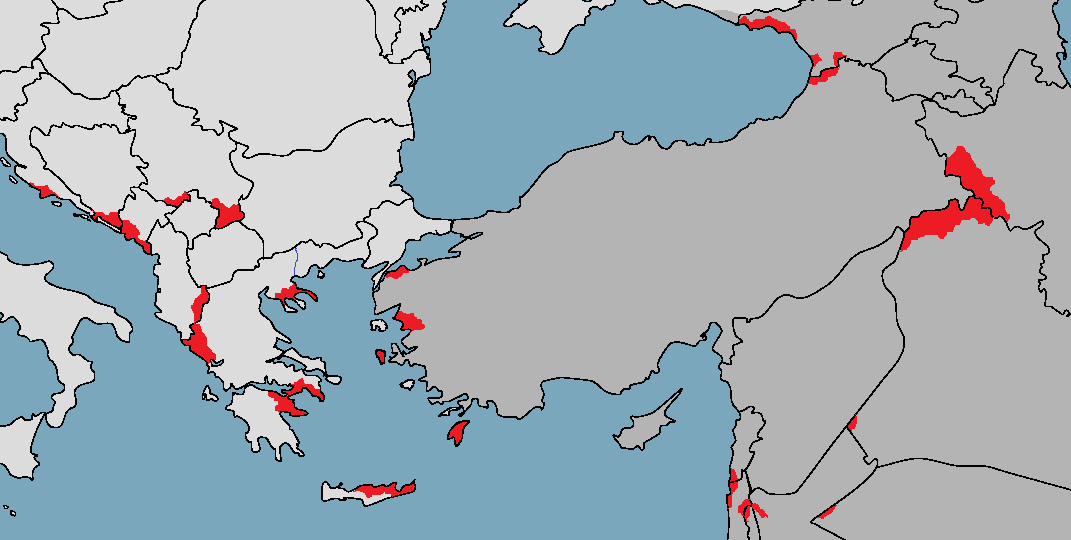

= Eastern broad-toothed field mouse =

Species of rodent

The eastern broad-toothed field mouse (Apodemus mystacinus) is a species of rodent in the family Muridae.

== Distribution ==
Following the classification of the Balkan population as a separate species western broad-toothed field mouse, the eastern broad-toothed field mouse sensu stricto is found in Georgia, Greece, Iran, Iraq, Israel, Jordan, Lebanon and Turkey.
