= Tokunoshima spiny rat =

Conservation status
- Endangered (IUCN 3.1)

Scientific classification
- Kingdom: Animalia
- Phylum: Chordata
- Class: Mammalia
- Order: Rodentia
- Family: Muridae
- Genus: Tokudaia
- Species: T. tokunoshimensis

Binomial name
- Tokudaia tokunoshimensis Endo & Tsuchiya, 2006
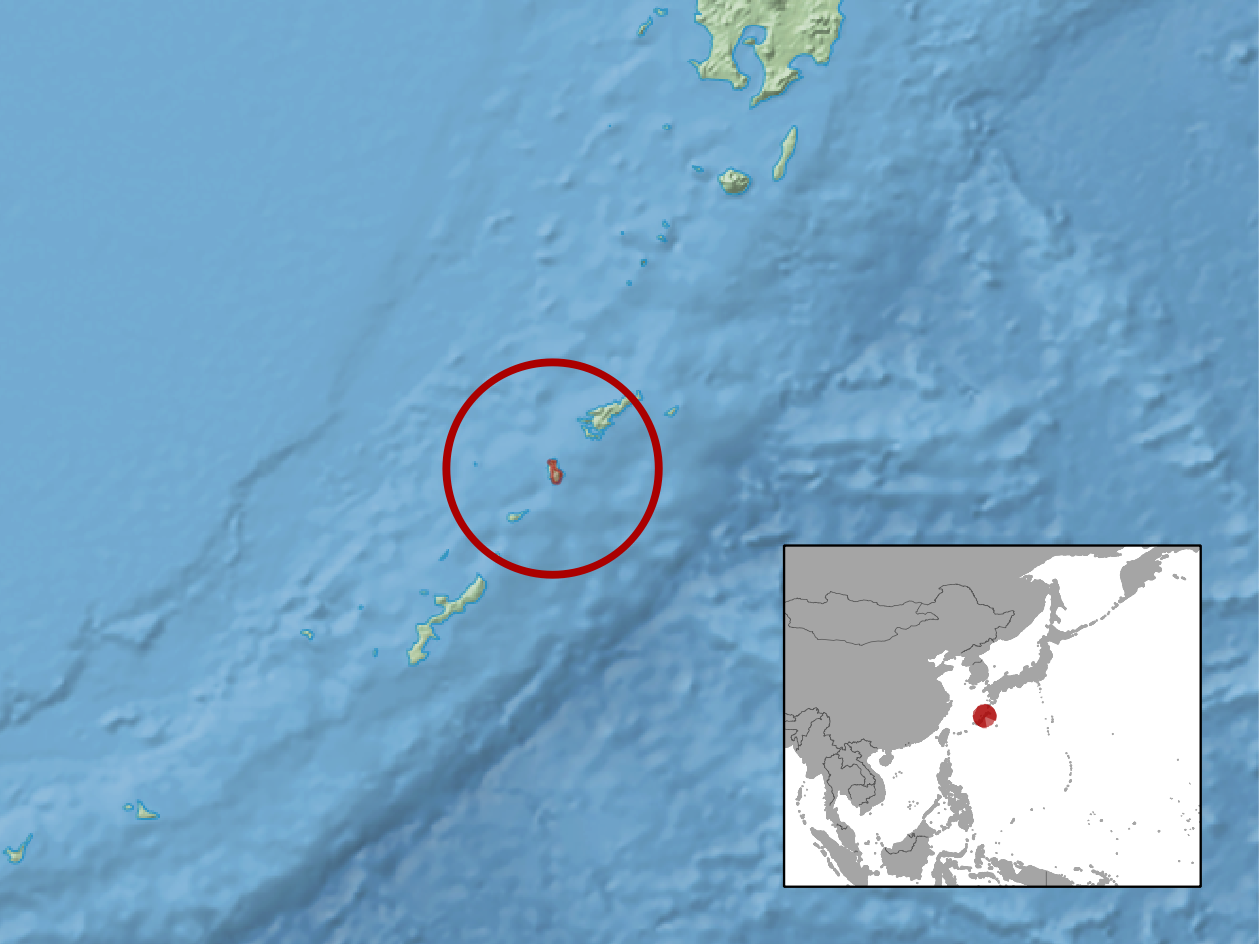

Species of rodent

The Tokunoshima spiny rat (Tokudaia tokunoshimensis) is a rodent found only on the island of Tokunoshima in the Satsunan Islands of Japan. Due to its small habitat, it is considered endangered. It is commonly found in the secondary and primary subtropical moist broadleaf forests of this island. The karyotype has an odd diploid number, 2n = 45. Like its relative T. osimensis, it is one of the few mammals that lack a Y chromosome and SRY gene.

The species is threatened by deforestation and predation by feral cats and dogs.

== See also ==
- Ellobius lutescens
- Ellobius tancrei
