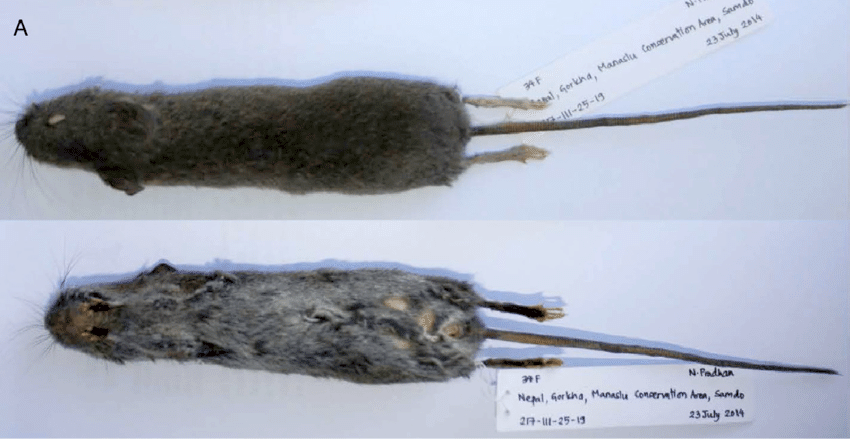

Conservation status
- Least Concern (IUCN 3.1)

Scientific classification
- Kingdom: Animalia
- Phylum: Chordata
- Class: Mammalia
- Order: Rodentia
- Family: Muridae
- Genus: Apodemus
- Species: A. gurkha

Binomial name
- Apodemus gurkha Thomas, 1924

= Himalayan field mouse =

Species of rodent

The Himalayan field mouse (Apodemus gurkha) is a rodent in the family Muridae. It is endemic to Nepal.

== Sources ==
- Musser, G. G.; Carleton, M. D. (2005). "Superfamily Muroidea". In Wilson, D. E.; Reeder, D. M. (eds.). Mammal Species of the World: A Taxonomic and Geographic Reference (3rd ed.). Johns Hopkins University Press. p. 1265. ISBN 978-0-8018-8221-0. OCLC 62265494.
