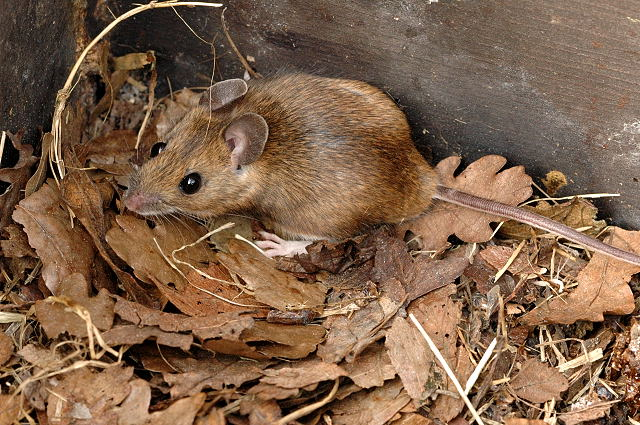

Conservation status
- Least Concern (IUCN 3.1)

Scientific classification
- Kingdom: Animalia
- Phylum: Chordata
- Class: Mammalia
- Order: Rodentia
- Family: Muridae
- Genus: Apodemus
- Species: A. flavicollis

Binomial name
- Apodemus flavicollis (Melchior, 1834)
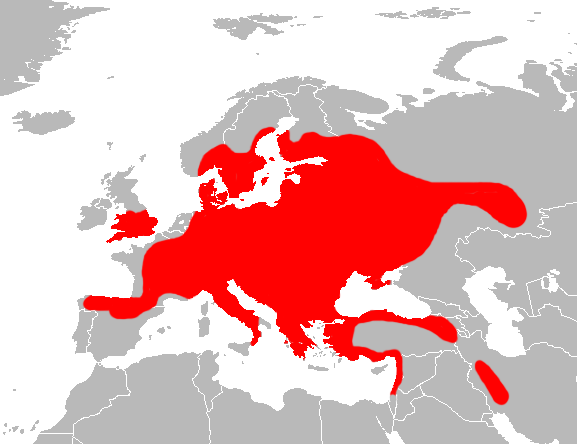

Synonyms
- Apodemus arianus; Apodemus ponticus

= Yellow-necked mouse =

Species of mammal

The yellow-necked mouse (Apodemus flavicollis), also called yellow-necked field mouse or yellow-necked wood mouse, is closely related to the wood mouse, with which it was long confused. It was only recognised as a separate species in 1894. It differs in its band of yellow fur around the neck and in having slightly larger ears and usually being slightly larger overall. Around 100 mm in length, it can climb trees and sometimes overwinters in houses. It is found mostly in mountainous areas of southern Europe, but extends north into parts of Scandinavia and Britain. It facilitates the spread of tick-borne encephalitis to humans and is a reservoir species for the Dobrava virus, a hantavirus that is responsible for causing haemorrhagic fever with renal syndrome.

== Taxonomy ==
Apodemus ponticus is probably a synonym of Apodemus flavicollis. The former is found in the former Soviet Union with the boundary between the two being the political boundary between Russia and Western Europe. For many years direct comparison of the two species was not possible because of political tensions but it is now accepted that they are in reality the same species.

== Description ==
The yellow-necked mouse is very similar to the wood mouse but differs in having a slightly longer tail and larger ears, and a complete band of yellow fur across the neck area. The adult head and body length is 3.5 to 5.25 inches (89–133 mm) with a tail about as long again, and the weight varies between 1 and 1.5 ounces (28–43 g). The upperparts are brownish-grey, a rather more brown shade than the wood mouse. The underparts are white and there is a sharp demarcation line between the two colours. This mouse gets its common name from the ochre-coloured patch of fur between its forelegs but this is often inconspicuous. The upperside of juveniles is a rather paler shade of greyish-brown than the adults.

== Distribution and habitat ==
The yellow-necked mouse is native to Europe and western Asia. Its range includes the more mountainous parts of Western Europe with the exception of northern Scandinavia, southern Spain and western France. This mouse occurs in Great Britain but not in Ireland, and it is also absent from a number of Mediterranean islands. In Asia, its range extends eastward to the Ural Mountains and it is also found in Turkey, Armenia, Iran, Syria, Lebanon and Israel. It is mostly a woodland species, often living near the forest verge, but in mountainous regions, it occupies any part of the forest. It is usually found in mature deciduous woodland is also found in scrubby areas, hedgerows, orchards and plantations. It favours areas where there are large, nut-bearing trees such as the oak and the hazel. It is also found in parks and gardens and beside alder-fringed streams.

== Behaviour ==
The yellow-necked mouse is active all year round and does not hibernate. Sometimes several mice will huddle together during the winter to preserve heat. It is an excellent climber and scrambles around in trees and bushes. It lives in crevices, burrows at the base of trees, holes in tree trunks, hollow logs and bird nesting boxes and sometimes enters buildings. The burrows are often extensive with many entrances and complex layouts. It makes extensive stores of food, such as acorns and beechmast, in storage chambers and uses other chambers for nesting, bringing in dry plant material for this purpose. There are often mounds of earth outside the entrances to the burrow. It also makes larders of food in holes in trees away from the burrow. The shade is very dense under a beech tree in summer and it has been found that beech nuts hidden in caches by the yellow-necked mouse, and not subsequently eaten, can later germinate and help with dispersal of the parent tree.

The yellow-necked mouse is nocturnal. It is active on the ground and in the tree canopy and has a home range rather smaller than half a hectare. Besides nuts, it feeds on buds, shoots, fruit, seedling plants and sometimes small invertebrates. Breeding takes place at any time between February and October with successive pregnancies occurring at short intervals. The gestation period is about twenty six days and females can remate while still feeding the previous litter. A litter of young is born in a nesting chamber lined with dry plant material and consists of two to eleven (usually five) altricial young born naked, blind, and helpless. The eyes of the young open after about a fortnight and their yellow collars are visible by then as grey patches. They are weaned at about eighteen days old. If they are born early in the year, they may start breeding in the same year, but late-born young become sexually mature in the following spring.

The yellow-necked mouse is preyed on by owls, foxes, weasels and other predators. It can leap to evade attackers and the skin of its tail is readily detachable and slides off if grasped by a predator.

== Research ==
It has been found that the yellow-necked mouse can transmit the virus causing tick-borne encephalitis while being immune to the virus itself. It has also been found that the yellow-necked mouse together with the striped field mouse (Apodemus agrarius) are the natural reservoir for an Orthohantavirus, the Dobrava virus, which causes a severe form of haemorrhagic fever with renal syndrome in humans.

== Status ==
The yellow-necked mouse has a very wide range and is common in suitable habitat within that range. In Eastern Europe, densities of up to a hundred individuals per hectare have been recorded. The population is stable and this species faces no specific threats so the IUCN has listed it as being of "Least Concern" in its Red List of Threatened Species.
