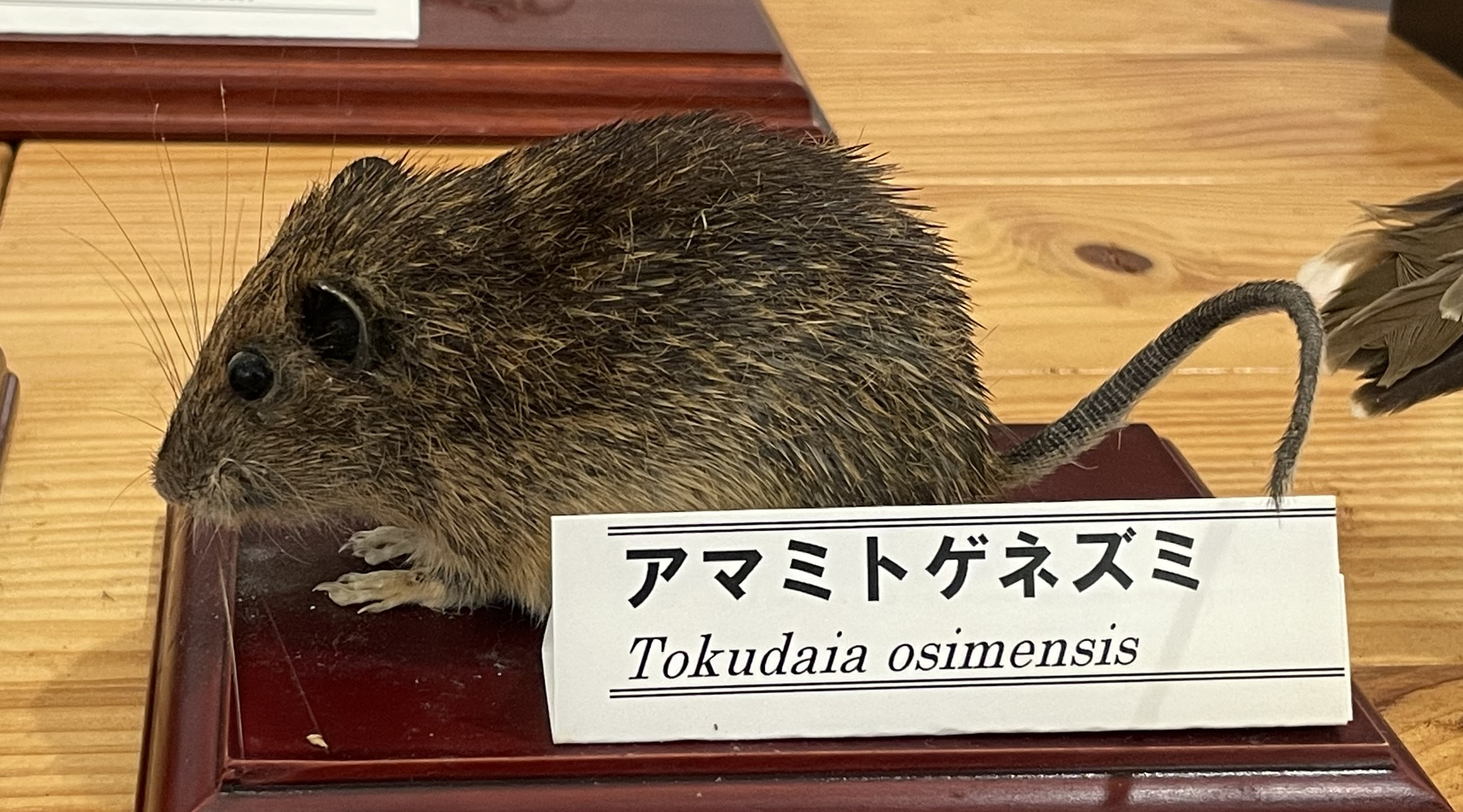

Conservation status
- Endangered (IUCN 3.1)

Scientific classification
- Kingdom: Animalia
- Phylum: Chordata
- Class: Mammalia
- Order: Rodentia
- Family: Muridae
- Genus: Tokudaia
- Species: T. osimensis

Binomial name
- Tokudaia osimensis (Y. Abe, 1934)
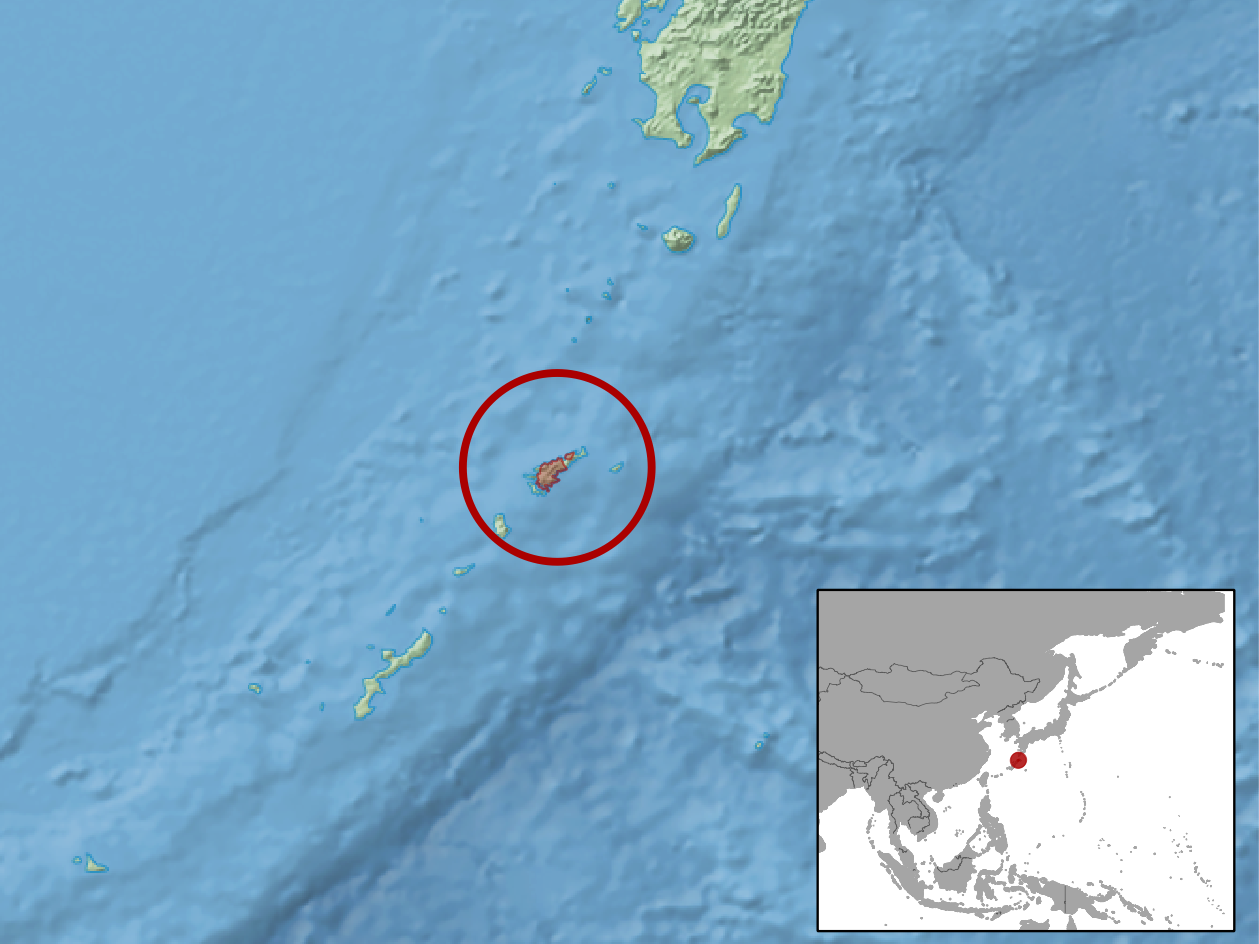

= Ryukyu spiny rat =

Species of rodent

The Ryukyu spiny rat (Tokudaia osimensis) is a species of rodent in the family Muridae. Endemic to Amami Ōshima island in the Amami Islands of the Ryukyu archipelago of Japan, its natural habitat is subtropical moist broadleaf forest. The karyotype has an odd diploid number, 2n = 25. Like its relative T. tokunoshimensis, it has lost its Y chromosome and SRY gene.

The species is threatened by habitat destruction and fragmentation, predation by feral cats and dogs and introduced mongooses, and competition with introduced black rats.

== See also ==
- Ellobius lutescens
- Ellobius tancrei
