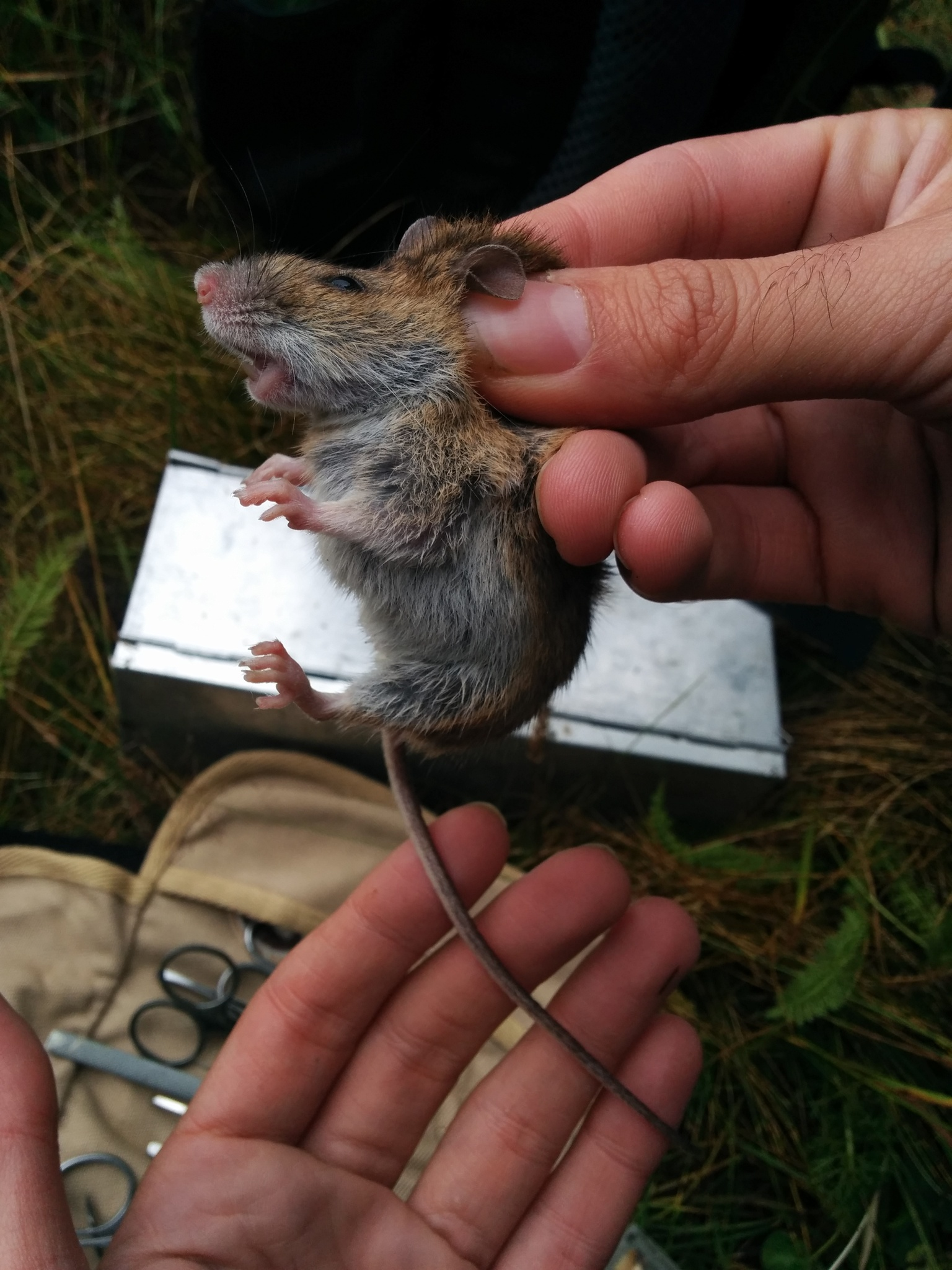
- In Gran Paradiso National Park, Italy

Conservation status
- Least Concern (IUCN 3.1)

Scientific classification
- Kingdom: Animalia
- Phylum: Chordata
- Class: Mammalia
- Order: Rodentia
- Family: Muridae
- Genus: Apodemus
- Species: A. alpicola

Binomial name
- Apodemus alpicola Heinrich, 1952

= Alpine field mouse =

Species of rodent

The alpine field mouse (Apodemus alpicola) is a species of rodent in the family Muridae. It is found in Austria, France, Italy, Germany and Switzerland.
