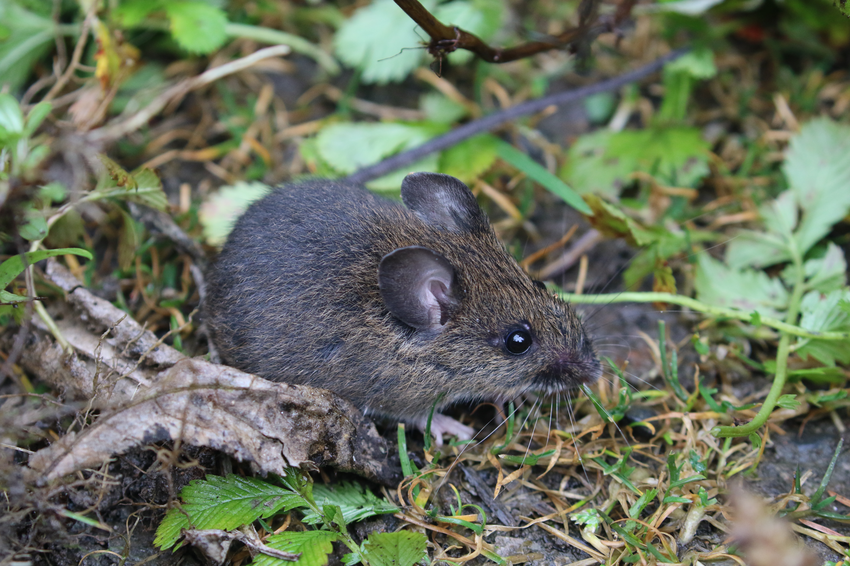

Conservation status
- Least Concern (IUCN 3.1)

Scientific classification
- Kingdom: Animalia
- Phylum: Chordata
- Class: Mammalia
- Order: Rodentia
- Family: Muridae
- Genus: Apodemus
- Species: A. draco

Binomial name
- Apodemus draco (Barrett-Hamilton, 1900)
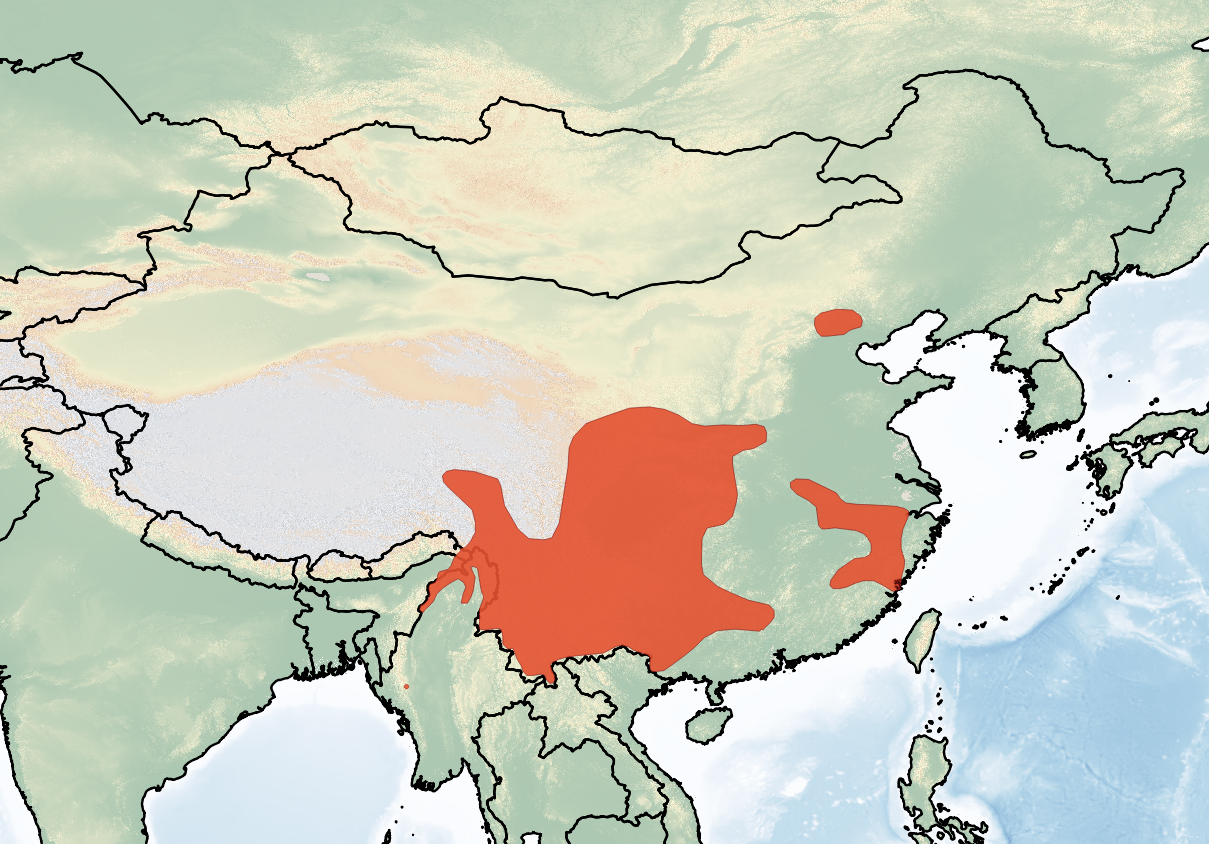

= South China field mouse =

Species of rodent

The South China field mouse (Apodemus draco) is a species of rodent in the family Muridae. It is found in China, India, and Myanmar.
