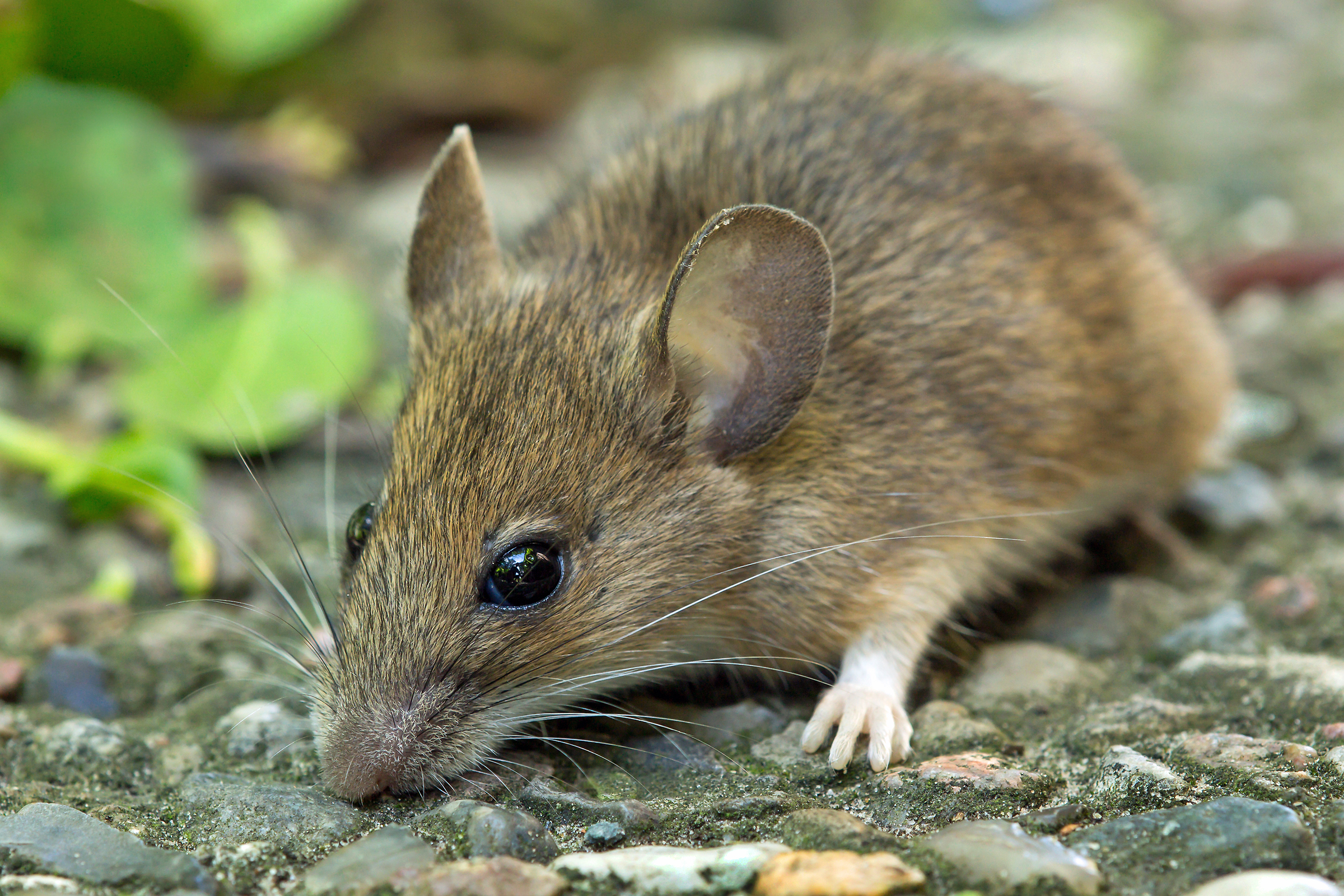

Conservation status
- Least Concern (IUCN 3.1)

Scientific classification
- Kingdom: Animalia
- Phylum: Chordata
- Class: Mammalia
- Order: Rodentia
- Family: Muridae
- Genus: Apodemus
- Species: A. sylvaticus

Binomial name
- Apodemus sylvaticus (Linnaeus, 1758)
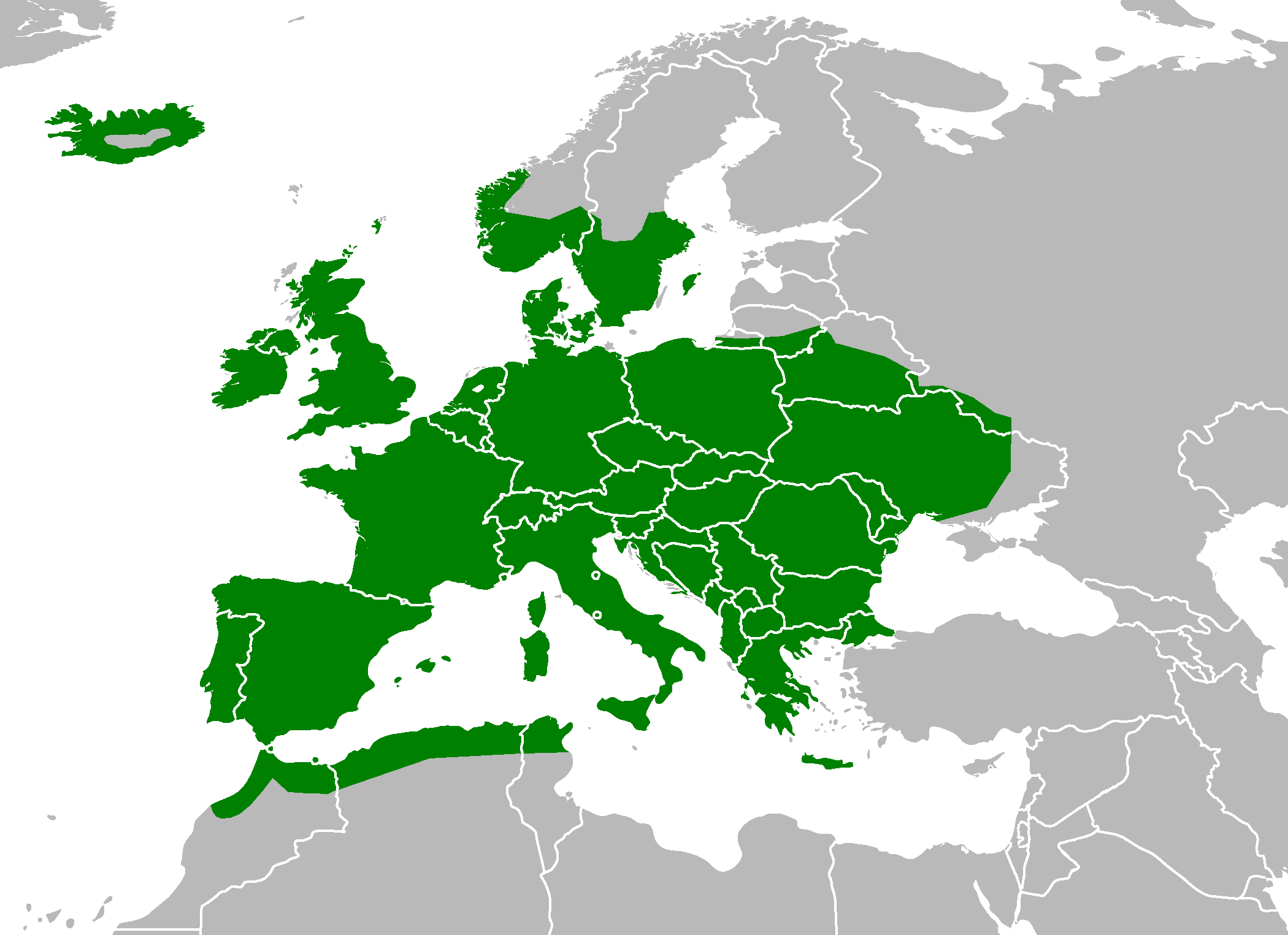
- Apodemus sylvaticus range (in green)

Synonyms
- Mus sylvaticus Linnaeus, 1758

= Wood mouse =

Species of rodent

The wood mouse (Apodemus sylvaticus) is a murid rodent native to Europe and northwestern Africa. It is closely related to the yellow-necked mouse (A. flavicollis) but differs in that it has no band of yellow fur around the neck, has slightly smaller ears, and is usually slightly smaller overall: around 90 mm (3.54 in) in length and 23 g in weight. It is found across most of Europe and is a very common and widespread species, is commensal with people and is sometimes considered a pest. Other common names are long-tailed field mouse, field mouse, common field mouse, and European wood mouse. This species is a known potential carrier of the Dobrava sequence of hantavirus which affects humans and may pose serious risks to human health.

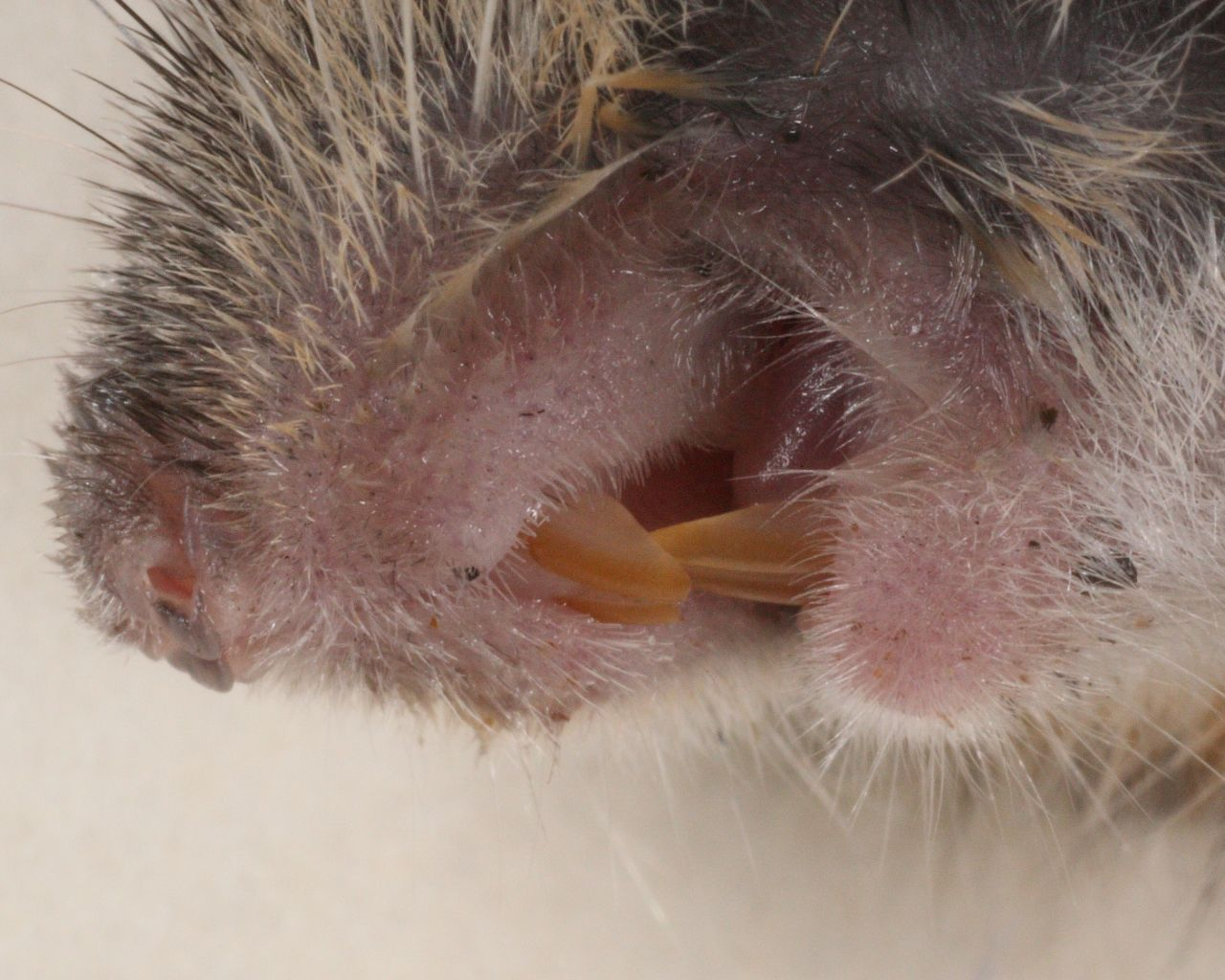
Upper front teeth with a smooth inner surface which distinguish the wood mouse from the house mouse

== Habitat and distribution ==
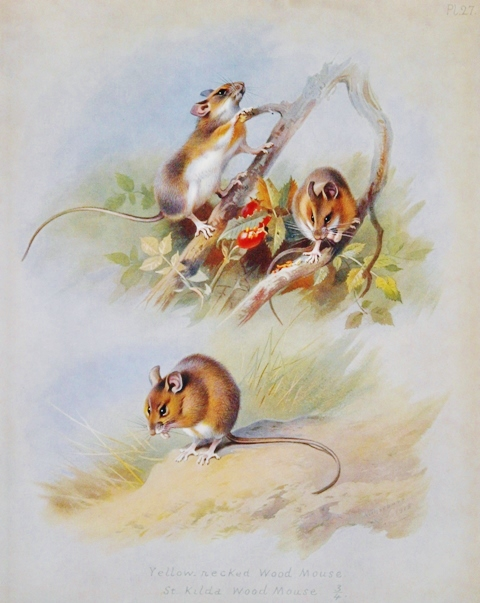
"Harvest, Wood Mouse" illustration from British Mammals by A. Thorburn, 1920

Wood mice inhabit forests, grasslands, and cultivated fields, tending to seek out more wooded areas in winter. Almost entirely nocturnal and terrestrial, wood mice burrow extensively, build nests of plants and live in buildings during harsh seasons. It is one of the most intensively studied species in the genus. In Europe, it ranges north to Scandinavia and east to Ukraine. The wood mouse is also found in northwestern Africa and on many Mediterranean islands.

== Diet ==
Wood mice are primarily seed eaters, particularly seeds of trees such as oak, beech, ash, lime, hawthorn and sycamore. If seeds are plentiful on the ground, they carry them back to their nests/burrows for storage. They may eat small invertebrates such as snails and insects, particularly in late spring and early summer when seeds are least available. Later in the season they will eat berries, fruits, fungi and roots. In winter, they may prey on hibernating bats, but this is still debatable.

== Behaviour ==
Wood mice are mainly active during the dark, probably having evolved so to avoid predation, employing several anti-predatory strategies, though breeding females may be more active in daylight in order to collect sufficient food. While foraging, wood mice pick up and distribute visually conspicuous objects, such as leaves and twigs, which they then use as landmarks during exploration. If a wood mouse is caught by its tail, it can quickly shed the end of it, which may never regrow. Despite its name, it prefers hedgerows to woodland. During the colder months, wood mice do not hibernate; however, during severe winter seasons they can fall into a torpid state, a decrease in physiological activity.

== Predation ==
Predators of wood mice include foxes, snakes, weasels, cats, dogs, and birds of prey such as owls.

== Reproduction ==
The wood mouse has a breeding season from February to October in which multiple matings occur between males and females, resulting in scramble competition. Such behavioral characteristics result in sperm competition and multiple paternity litters. The society is polygynous with copulation resulting from scramble competition during reproductive periods. Males possess a sac known as the cauda epididymis, which stores sperm and lies underneath the scrotal protrusion. Temperature regulation ensures maximum sperm output.

One interesting observation about the species, in particular the males, is the morphology of the spermatozoa. They develop falciform (sickle-shaped) heads after meiosis and before spermiation (release during ejaculation). The hook located at the tip of the head adheres to the surface of the head prior to deployment. Propidium iodide staining revealed that only the basal surface of the hook is of nuclear origin. These apical hooks are deployed in the female reproductive tract (the mechanism responsible involved the remodeling of actin filaments in the hook). Deployed apical hooks combine with apical hooks and flagella of other spermatozoa. The aggregates of spermatozoa that result in form "mobile trains", which have experimentally been determined to possess better motility in the female reproductive tract. The mobility of these mobile trains was also found to be influenced by premature acrosome reactions, altruistic acts performed by some spermatozoa for the benefit of other genetically similar gametocytes. This altruism follows a "green beard" mechanism in which spermatozoa discern the genetic similarity of surrounding gametocytes (such mechanisms are rare because they must code for a recognizable phenotype, as well as response mechanisms). Once spermatozoa of similar genotypes are identified, altruism genes are turned on to elicit a response that seeks to conserve the genes present in the other cell, even if it results in the destruction of the cell performing the action.

The gestation period of wood mice is of 23–27 days and each female produces on average four young per year. The offspring become independent after about three weeks and become sexually active after two months.

== Gallery ==
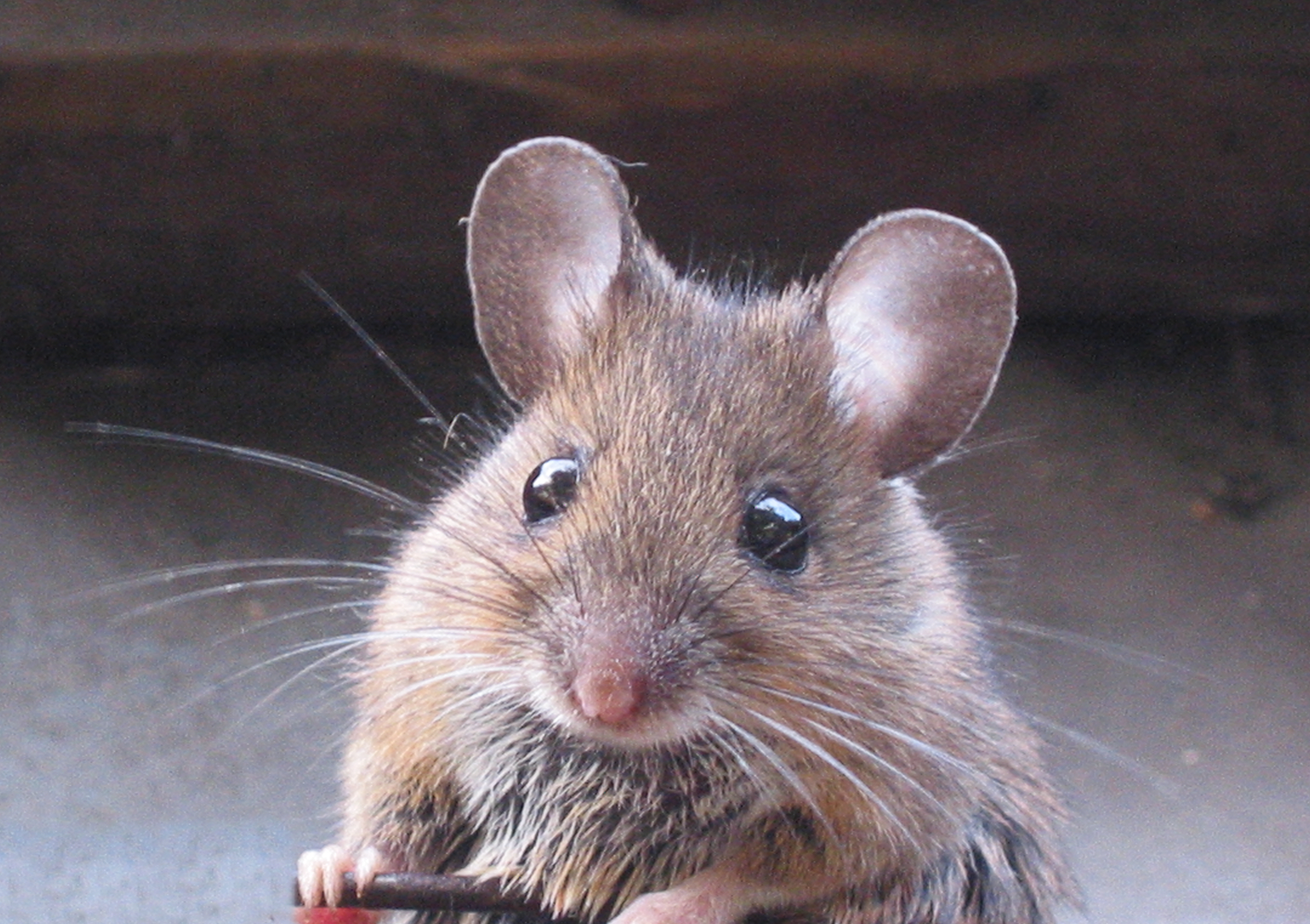
portrait

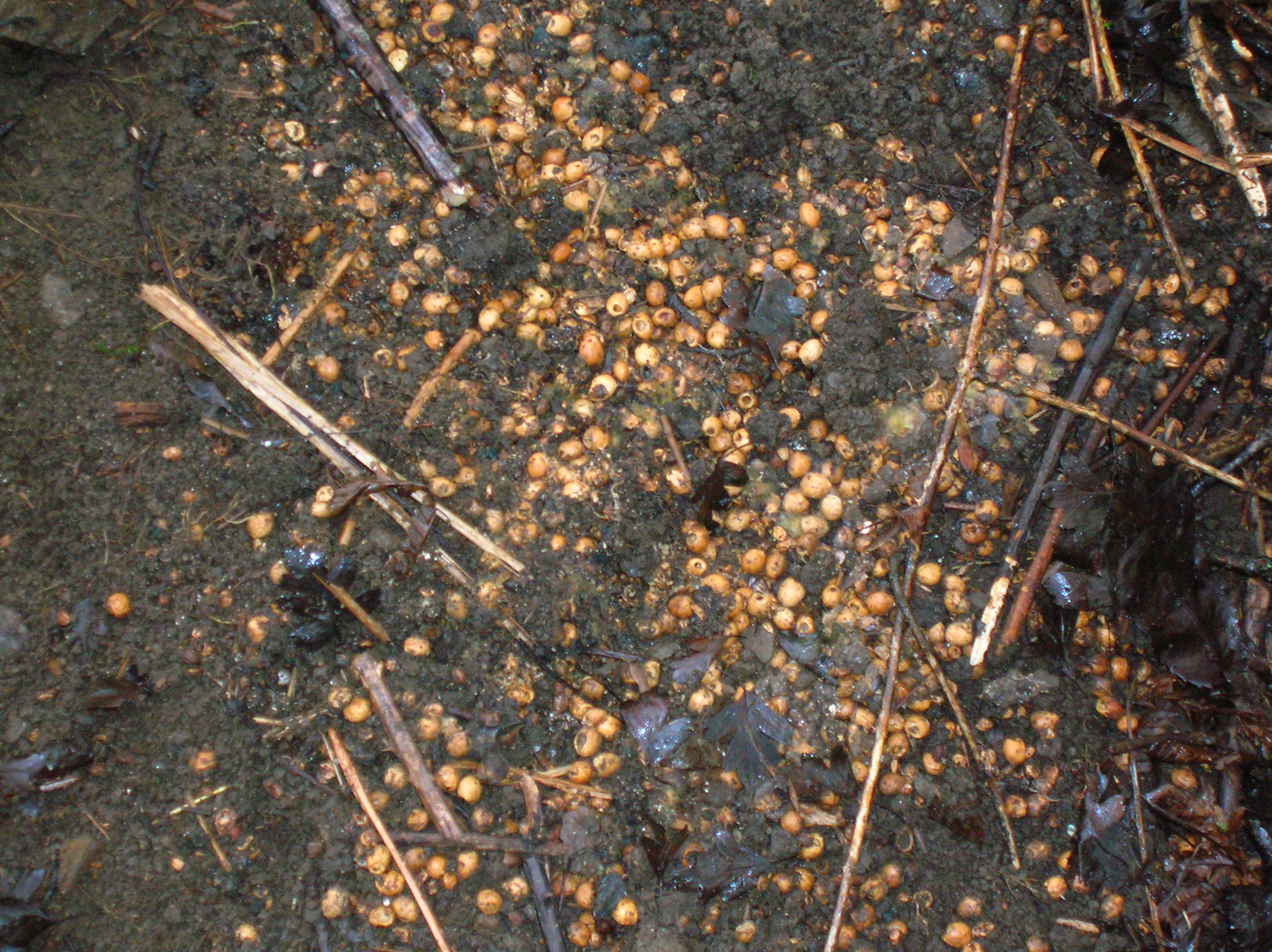
cherry stone hoard

Wood mouse in an attic

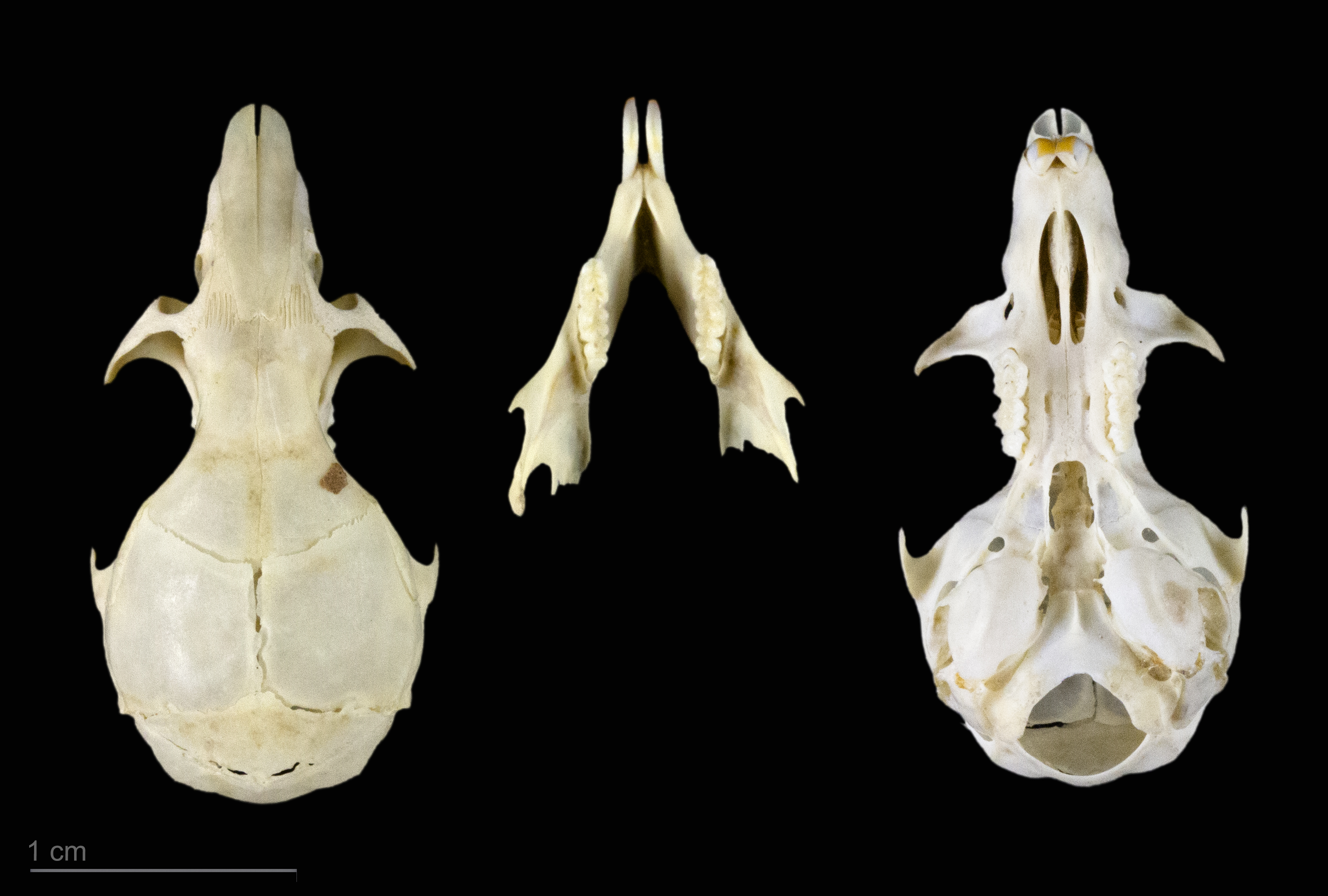
Skull of Apodemus sylvaticus - MHNT
