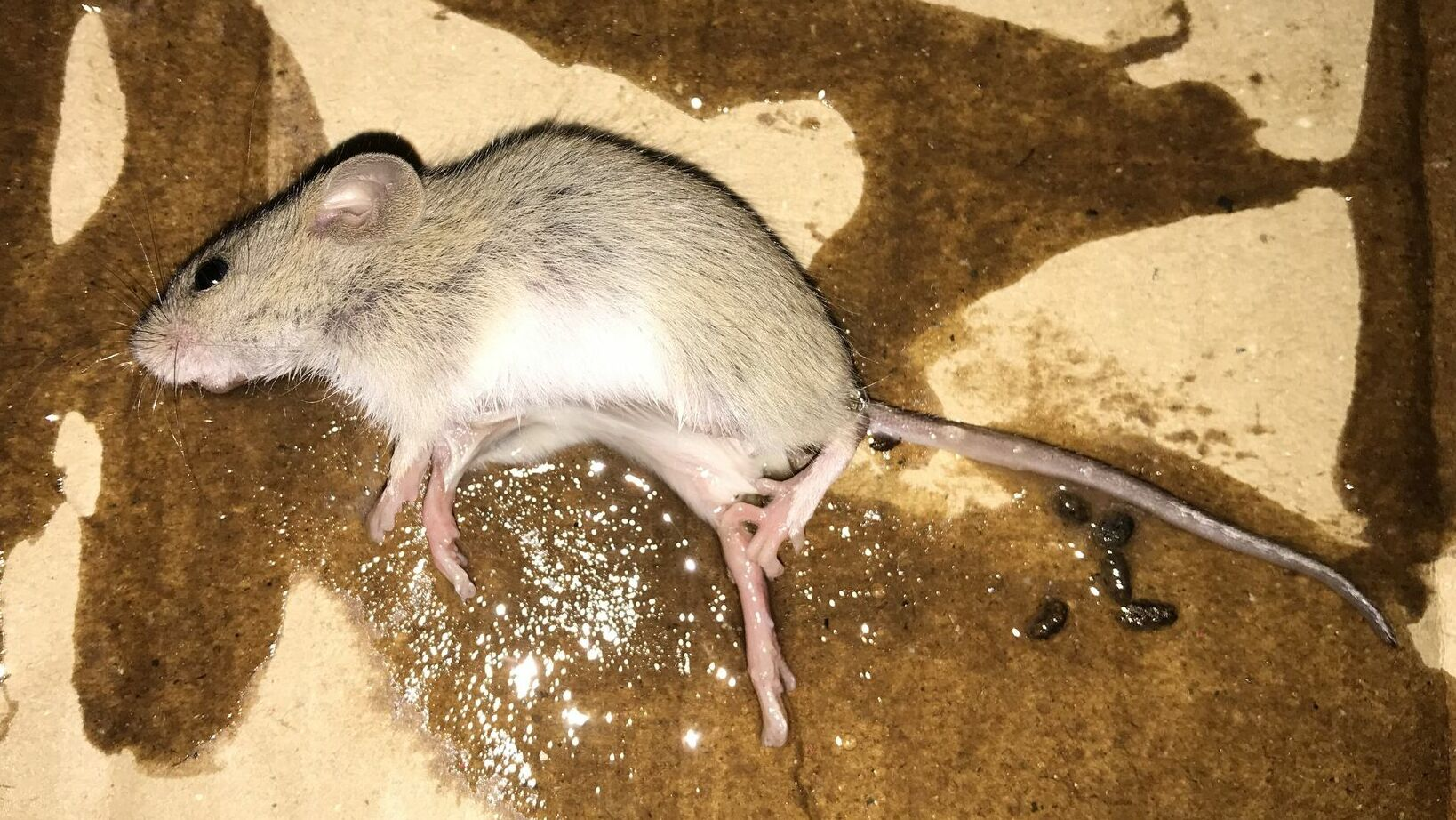

Conservation status
- Least Concern (IUCN 3.1)

Scientific classification
- Kingdom: Animalia
- Phylum: Chordata
- Class: Mammalia
- Order: Rodentia
- Family: Muridae
- Genus: Apodemus
- Species: A. pallipes

Binomial name
- Apodemus pallipes (Barrett-Hamilton, 1900)

Synonyms
- Apodemus wardi

= Ward's field mouse =

Species of rodent

Ward's field mouse (Apodemus pallipes) is a species of rodent in the family Muridae. It is found in Kyrgyzstan, Tajikistan, Afghanistan, India, Iran, Nepal, and Pakistan.
