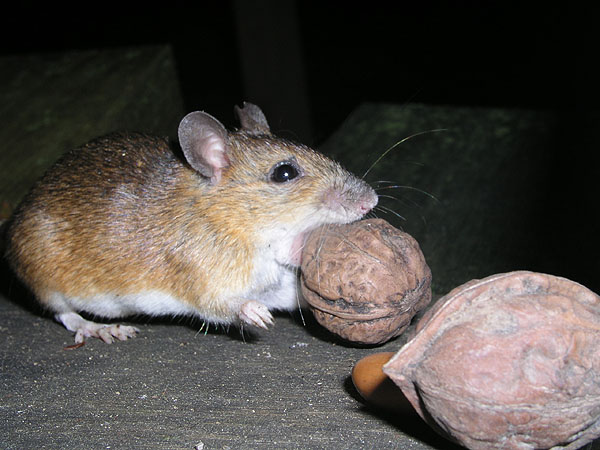

Conservation status
- Least Concern (IUCN 3.1)

Scientific classification
- Kingdom: Animalia
- Phylum: Chordata
- Class: Mammalia
- Order: Rodentia
- Family: Muridae
- Genus: Apodemus
- Species: A. speciosus

Binomial name
- Apodemus speciosus (Temminck, 1844)

= Large Japanese field mouse =

Species of rodent

The large Japanese field mouse (Apodemus speciosus) is a nocturnal species of rodent in the family Muridae. It is endemic to Japan.

== Distribution and habitat ==
The species appears to be present on all Japanese islands. It inhabits forests, grasslands, and cultivated fields, including rice paddies, at any altitude. Though occupying the same broad ecological niche as A. argenteus, the two species prefer different microhabitats: A. argenteus prefers dense canopy, while A. speciosus prefers open secondary forests.

== Foraging behavior ==
Large Japanese field mice forage primarily at night, likely to avoid predation. They are omnivores but mostly known to be seed-eating mice, particularly around autumn and winter, as the mice hoard acorns and walnuts, which comprise 13-100% of their food. This makes them effective seed dispersers. Mast seeding can have serious effects on field mouse populations, including increases in overwinter survival, winter reproduction, and population density.

=== Effects of light ===
Large Japanese field mice have been observed changing their typical foraging behavior in response to varying light conditions. In response to higher light intensity, A. speciosus significantly decreases time outside of the nest, length of excursions, and food eaten compared to periods of dark. Additionally, the mice tend to carry food back to their nests during periods of light as opposed to eating away from the nest as they normally would in the dark. These behavioral changes are thought to be an adaptation to help the mice avoid potential predators, avoiding, for example, well-lit areas on the ground as they forage at night. Differences in such changes in behavior allow for the fulfillment of specific niches, as is observed between A. speciosus and A. argenteus, which react to light differently because of their differing body size.

=== Tannin selection ===
Many of the acorns and nuts consumed by this species have high tannin levels, making them highly toxic to rodents in high doses. Large Japanese field mice display specific physiological and behavioral adaptations to deal with this toxicity. A. speciosus is able to acclimate to nuts with high tannin levels by secretion of specialized proteins and recruitment of bacteria to aid in digestion. It also displays a proactive foraging preference for acorns with lower levels of tannin and related proteins. These changes are evolutionarily adaptive by allowing the mice to deal with or avoid tannin consumption.

=== Learning behavior ===
A. speciosus, like many species of rodents, have shown a degree of learning in their feeding habits. Specifically, wood mice with previous experience eating walnuts are able to eat them more quickly, efficiently, and in greater quantities than mice that had not encountered hard-shelled walnuts. Additionally, mice without previous experience are able to successfully learn more efficient foraging behavior within 14 days of conditioning, a strong indication that foraging behavior is not strictly genetically determined and that trial-and-error may be a contributing mechanism. The behavior is also affected socially, as mice raised in specific environments forage in ways that mice in other environments may not. For example, large Japanese field mice raised in environments with more tannin-rich nuts show greater selectivity than those that do not. Behavioral fluidity and the ability to quickly adapt to environments without the need for evolution, which would take many generations to become apparent, is key for the survival of the mice in varying environments.
