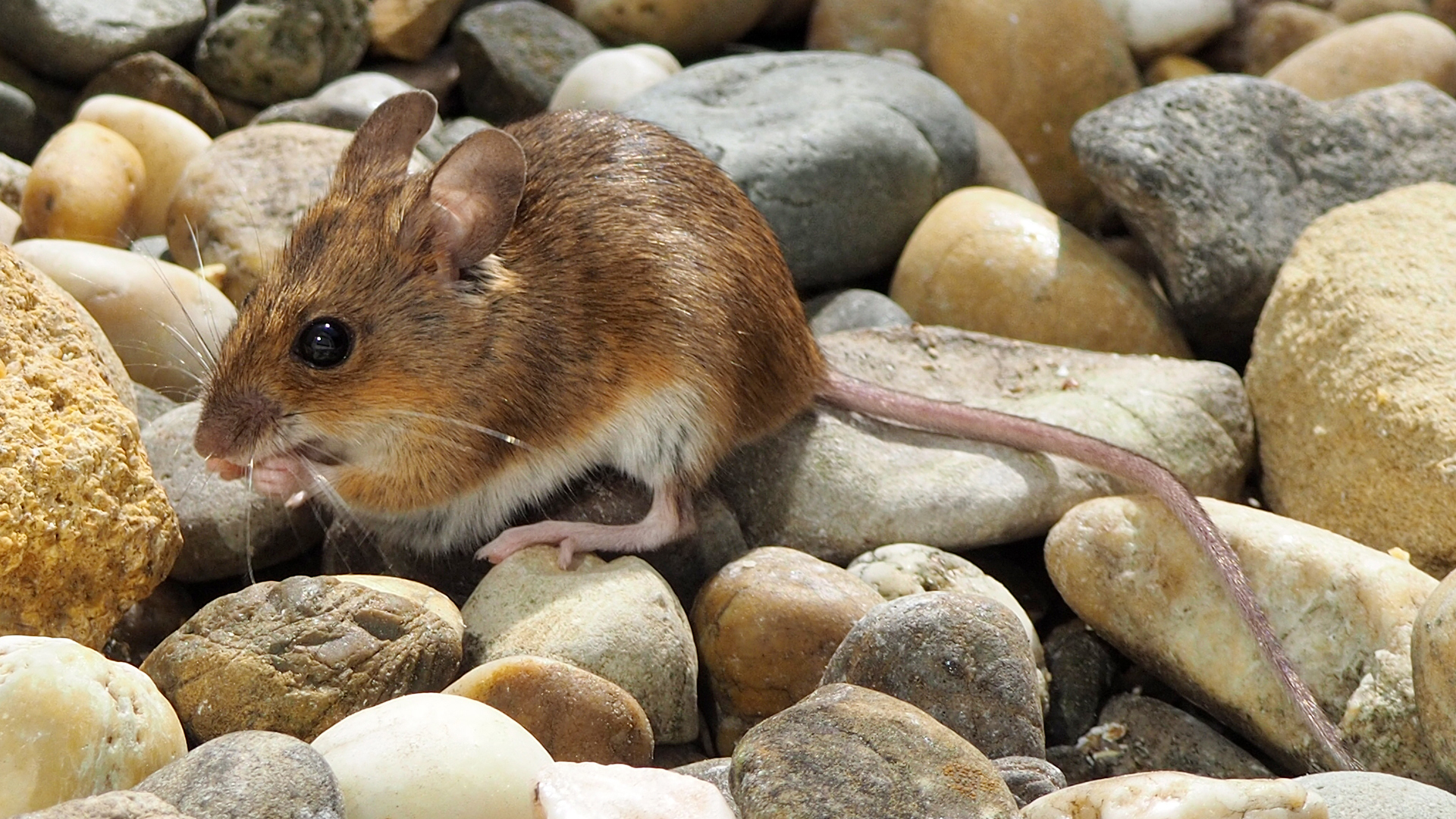
- Wood mouse (Apodemus sylvaticus)

Scientific classification
- Kingdom: Animalia
- Phylum: Chordata
- Class: Mammalia
- Order: Rodentia
- Family: Muridae
- Tribe: Apodemini
- Genus: Apodemus; Kaup, 1829

Type species
- Mus agrarius

Species
- About 20, see text

= Apodemus =

Apodemus Temporal range: Late Miocene - recent

Genus of rodents

Apodemus is a genus of murid (true mice and rats) containing the field mice as well as other well-known species like the wood mouse and the yellow-necked mouse. The name is unrelated to that of the Mus genus, instead being derived from the Greek ἀπό-δημος (literally away from home).

== Taxonomy ==
Related to the Ryūkyū spiny rats (Tokudaia) and the prehistoric Rhagamys – and far more distantly to Mus and Malacomys – it includes these species:

=== Apodemus sensu stricto ===
- Striped field mouse, A. agrarius
- Small Japanese field mouse, A. argenteus
- Chevrier's field mouse, A. chevrieri

=== Alsomys ===
- South China field mouse, A. draco
- Himalayan field mouse, A. gurkha
- Sichuan field mouse, A. latronum
- Korean field mouse, A. peninsulae
- Taiwan field mouse, A. semotus
- Large Japanese field mouse, A. speciosus

=== Sylvaemus ===
- Alpine field mouse, A. alpicola
- Yellow-necked mouse, A. flavicollis – includes A. arianus
- Caucasus field mouse, A. hyrcanicus
- Ward's field mouse, A. pallipes
- Black Sea field mouse, A. ponticus
- Wood mouse, A. sylvaticus
- Ural field mouse, A. uralensis
  - Pygmy field mouse, A. u. microps
  - Cimrman Ural field mouse, A. u. cimrmani
- Steppe field mouse, A. witherbyi

=== Karstomys ===
- Western broad-toothed field mouse, A. epimelas
- Eastern broad-toothed field mouse, A. mystacinus
- Kashmir field mouse, A. rusiges

=== Incertae sedis ===
- Apodemus avicennicus Darvish, Javidkar & Siahsarvie, 2006

Prehistoric species described from fossil remains include:

- A. gorafensis (Late Miocene/Early Pliocene of Italy)
- A. dominans (Kolzoi 1959)
