= List of mammals of Switzerland =

This list shows the IUCN Red List status of the mammal species occurring in Switzerland. Nine of them are near threatened, and most are least concern.

Icons which state each species' global IUCN status:
EX	Extinct	No reasonable doubt that the last individual has died
CR	Critically Endangered	In imminent risk of extinction in the wild
EN	Endangered	Facing an extremely high risk of extinction in the wild
VU	Vulnerable	Facing a high risk of extinction in the wild
NT	Near Threatened	Doesn't meet any criteria that would categorise it as risking extinction but likely to in the future
LC	Least Concern	No current identifiable risks to this species

== Order: Rodentia (rodents) ==
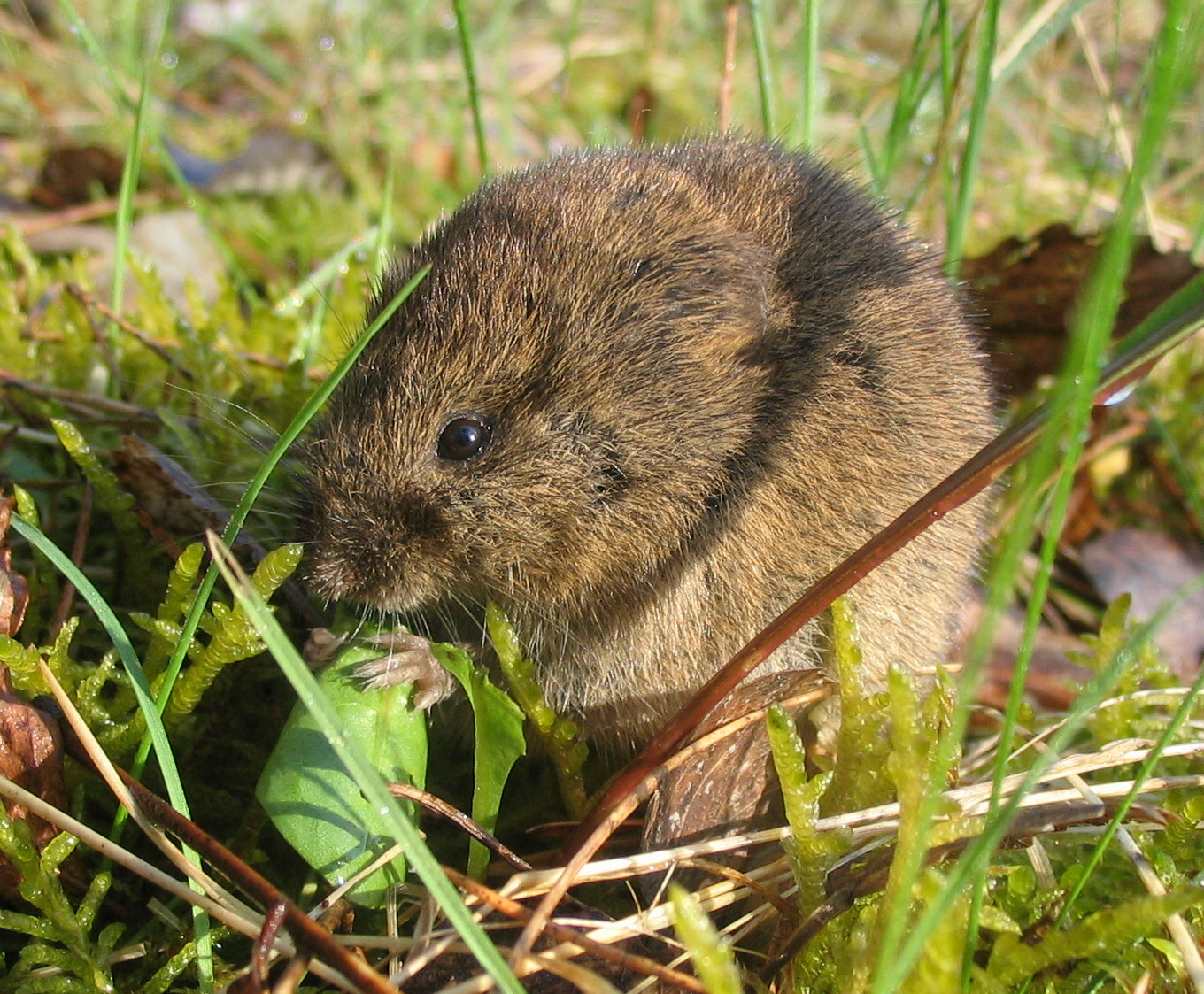
Common vole

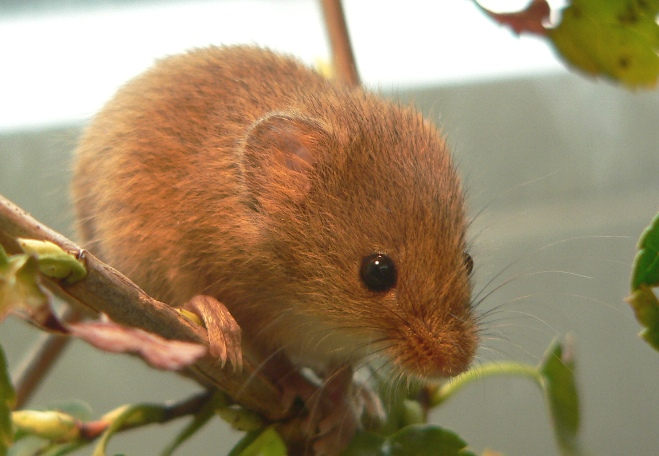
Harvest mouse

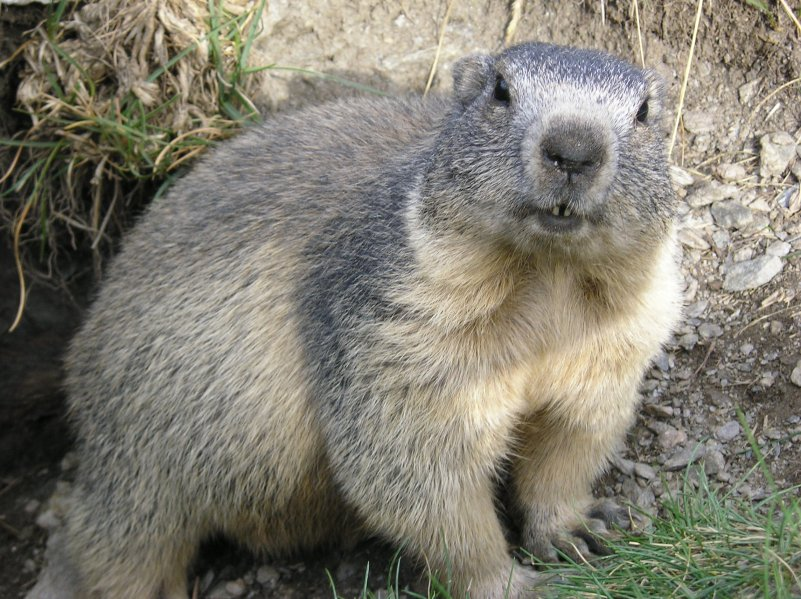
Alpine marmot a recognisable animal of Switzerland often associated with Switzerland living high in the mountain tops

Rodents make up the largest order of mammals, with over 40% of mammalian species. They have two incisors in the upper and lower jaw which grow continually and must be kept short by gnawing.

- Suborder: Castorimorpha
  - Family: Castoridae
    - Subfamily: Castorinae
      - Tribe: Castorini
        - Genus: Castor
          - Eurasian beaver, C. fiber LC reintroduced
- Suborder: Sciurognathi
  - Family: Sciuridae (squirrels)
    - Subfamily: Sciurinae
      - Tribe: Sciurini
        - Genus: Sciurus
          - Red squirrel, S. vulgaris LC
    - Subfamily: Xerinae
      - Tribe: Marmotini
        - Genus: Marmota
          - Alpine marmot, M. marmota LC
  - Family: Gliridae (dormice)
    - Subfamily: Leithiinae
      - Genus: Dryomys
        - Forest dormouse, D. nitedula LC
      - Genus: Eliomys
        - Garden dormouse, E. quercinus VU
      - Genus: Muscardinus
        - Hazel dormouse, M. avellanarius LC
    - Subfamily: Glirinae
      - Genus: Glis
        - European edible dormouse, G. glis LC
  - Family: Cricetidae
    - Subfamily: Arvicolinae
      - Genus: Arvicola
        - European water vole, A. amphibius LC
      - Genus: Chionomys
        - European snow vole, C. nivalis LC
      - Genus: Clethrionomys
        - Bank vole, C. glareolus LC
      - Genus: Microtus
        - Field vole, M. agrestis LC
        - Common vole, M. arvalis LC
        - Alpine pine vole, M. multiplex LC
        - European pine vole, M. subterraneus LC
    - Subfamily: Cricetinae
      - Genus: Cricetus
        - European hamster, C. cricetus CR extirpated
  - Family: Muridae (mice, rats, voles, gerbils, hamsters)
    - Subfamily: Murinae
      - Genus: Mus
        - House mouse, M. musculus LC
      - Genus: Apodemus
        - Alpine field mouse, A. alpicola LC
        - Yellow-necked mouse, A. flavicollis LC
        - Wood mouse, A. sylvaticus LC
      - Genus: Micromys
        - Eurasian harvest mouse, M. minutus LC

== Order: Lagomorpha (lagomorphs) ==
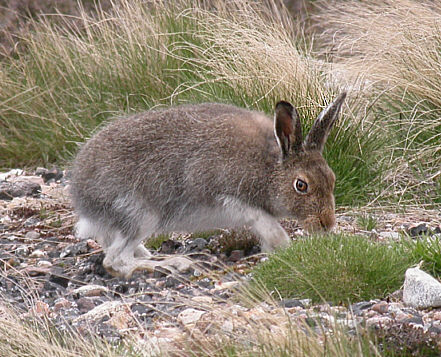
Mountain hare

The lagomorphs comprise two families, Leporidae (hares and rabbits), and Ochotonidae (pikas). Though they can resemble rodents, and were classified as a superfamily in that order until the early 20th century, they have since been considered a separate order. They differ from rodents in a number of physical characteristics, such as having four incisors in the upper jaw rather than two.

- Family: Leporidae (rabbits, hares)
  - Genus: Lepus
    - European hare, L. europaeus LC
    - Mountain hare, L. timidus LC
  - Genus: Oryctolagus
    - European rabbit, O. cuniculus NT introduced

== Order: Eulipotyphla (shrews, hedgehogs and moles) ==
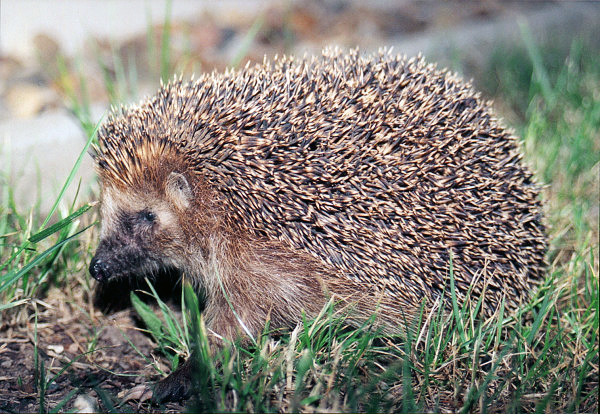
European hedgehog

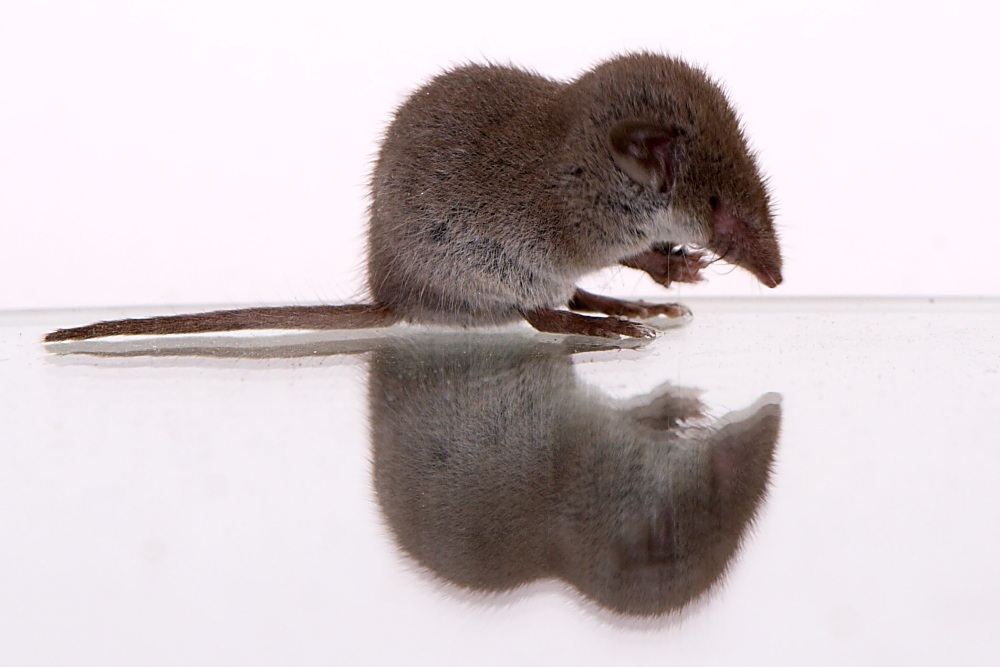
Lesser white-toothed shrew

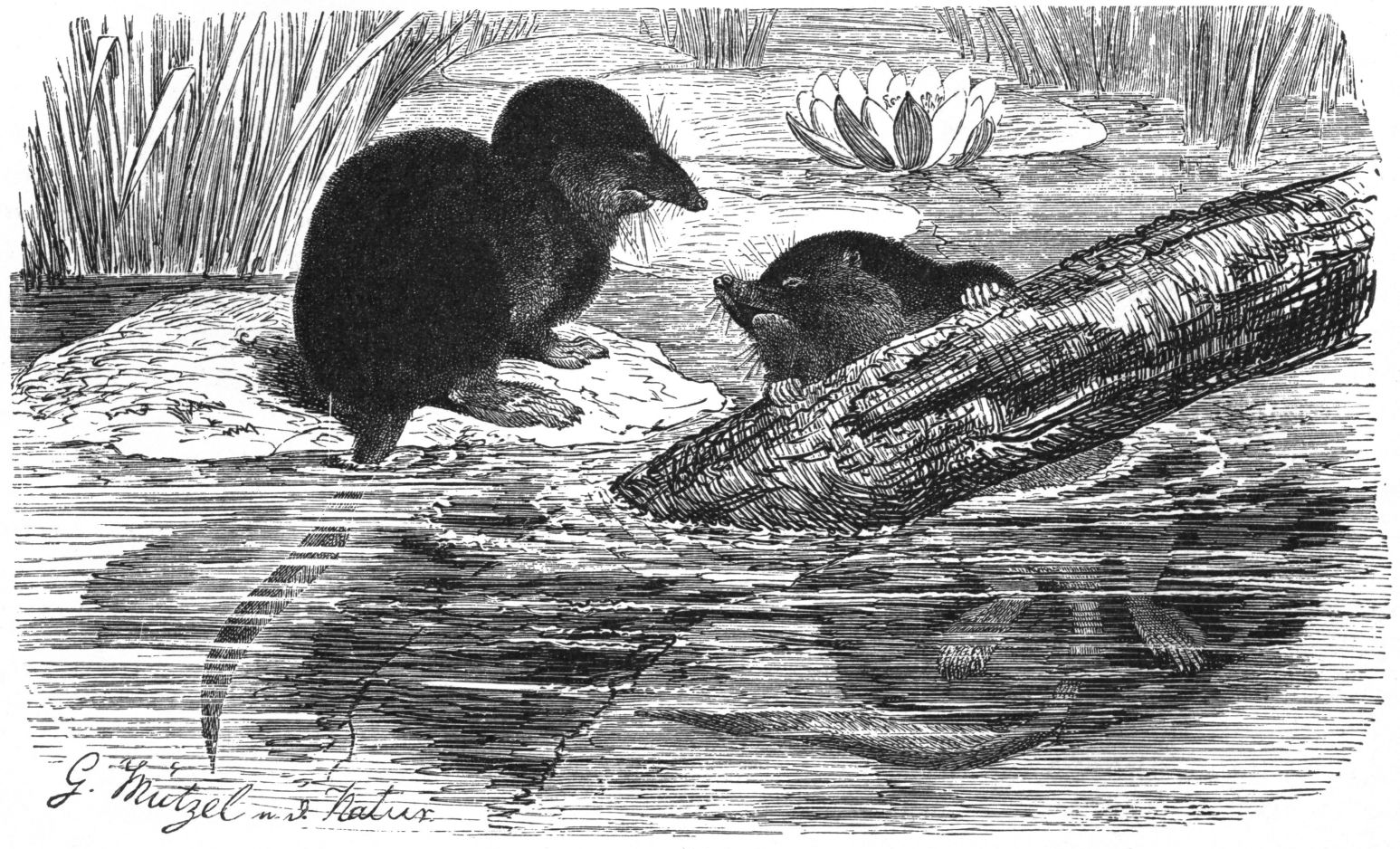
Eurasian water shrew

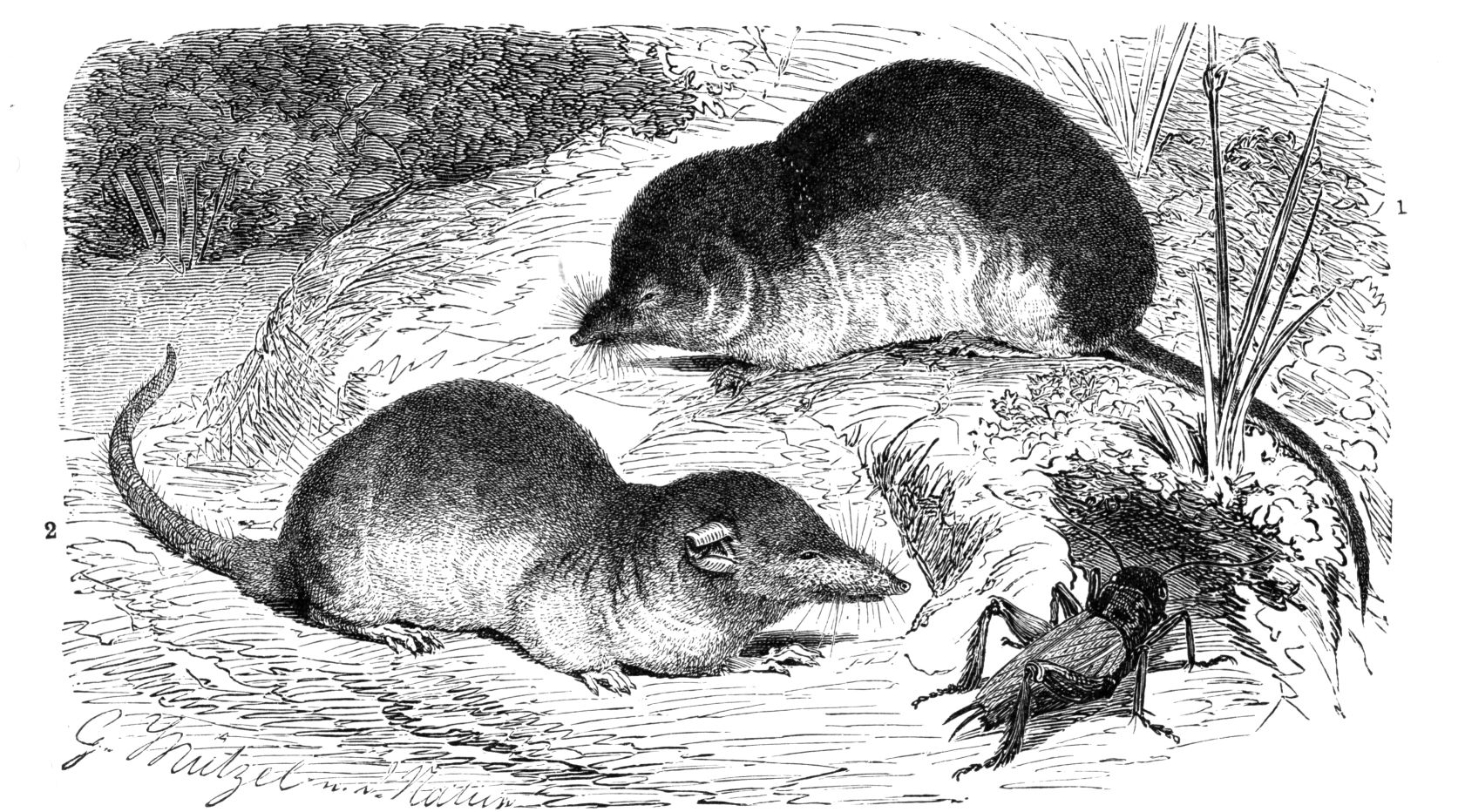
Common shrew

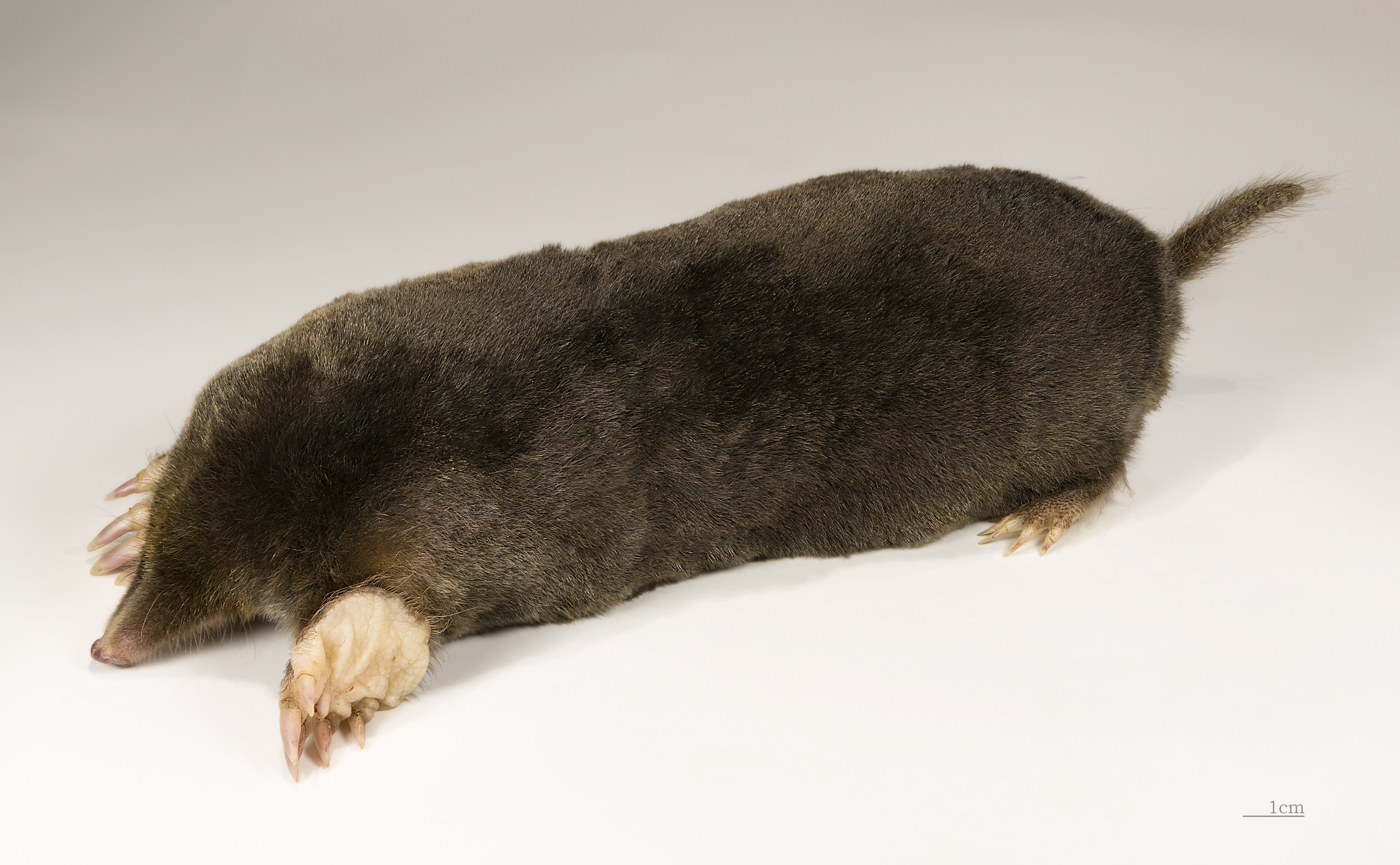
European mole

Eulipotyphlans are insectivorous mammals. Shrews and solenodons resemble mice, hedgehogs carry spines, gymnures look more like large rats, while moles are stout-bodied burrowers.

- Family: Erinaceidae (hedgehogs)
  - Subfamily: Erinaceinae
    - Genus: Erinaceus
      - West European hedgehog, E. europaeus NT
- Family: Soricidae (shrews)
  - Subfamily: Crocidurinae
    - Genus: Crocidura
      - Bicolored shrew, C. leucodon LC
      - Greater white-toothed shrew, C. russula LC
      - Lesser white-toothed shrew, C. suaveolens LC
  - Subfamily: Soricinae
    - Tribe: Nectogalini
      - Genus: Neomys
        - Mediterranean water shrew, N. anomalus LC
        - Eurasian water shrew, N. fodiens LC
    - Tribe: Soricini
      - Genus: Sorex
        - Alpine shrew, S. alpinus NT
        - Common shrew, S. araneus LC
        - Crowned shrew, S. coronatus LC
        - Eurasian pygmy shrew, S. minutus LC
- Family: Talpidae (moles)
  - Subfamily: Talpinae
    - Tribe: Talpini
      - Genus: Talpa
        - Mediterranean mole, T. caeca LC
        - European mole, T. europaea LC

== Order: Chiroptera (bats) ==
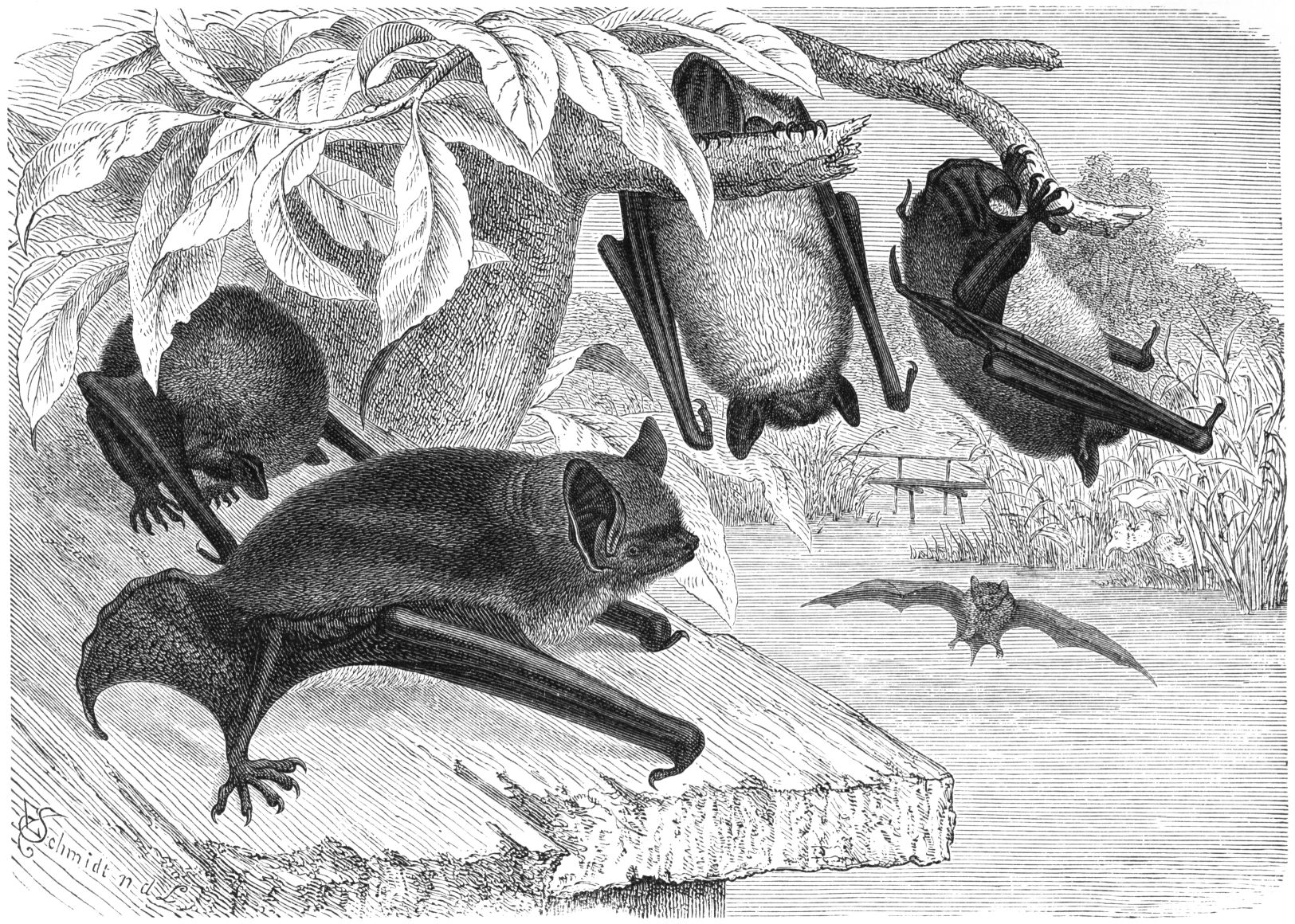
Daubenton's bat

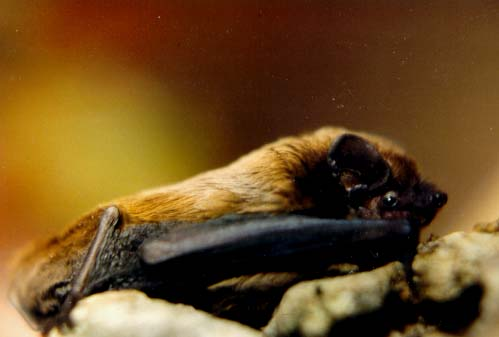
Lesser noctule

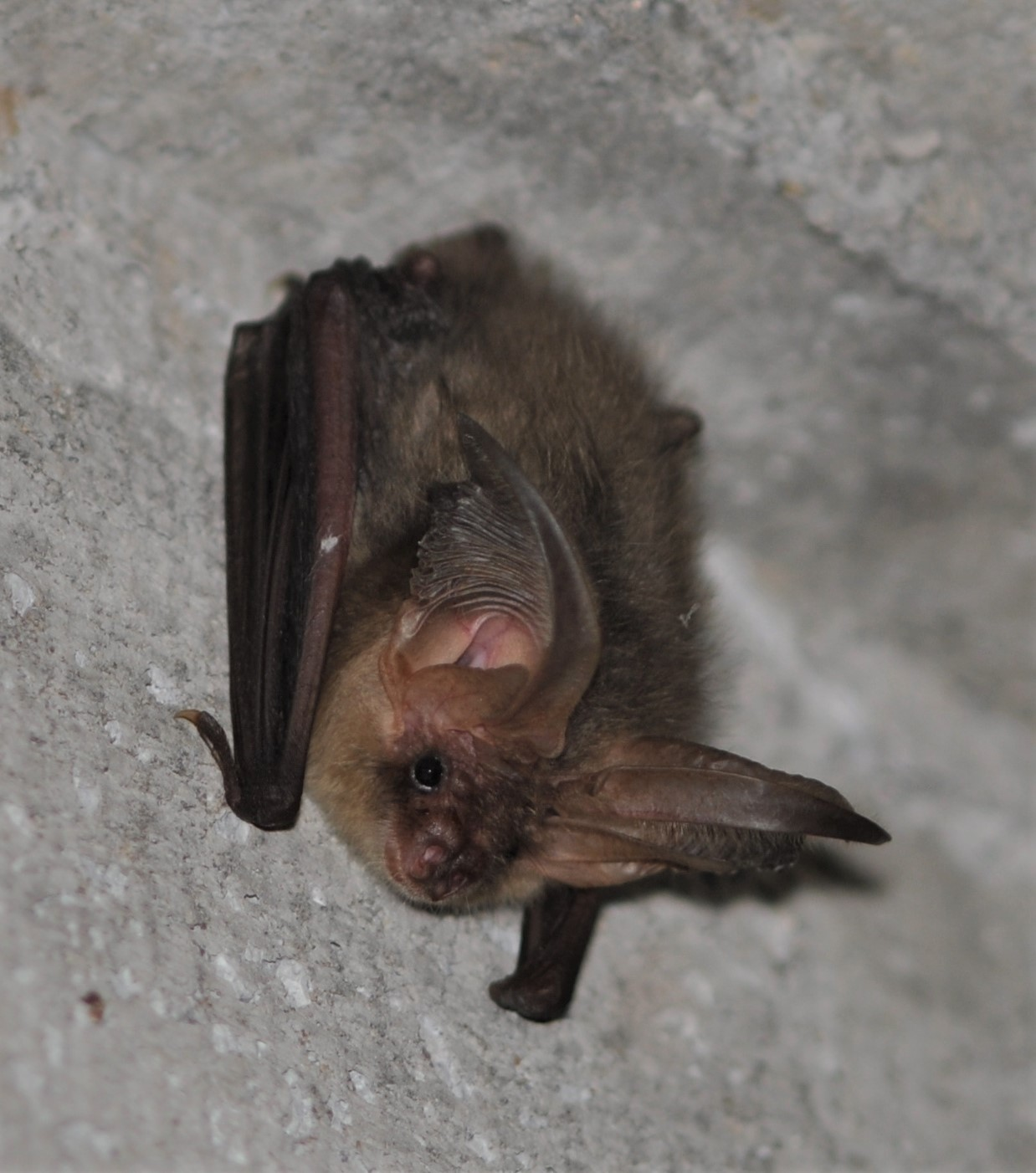
Brown long-eared bat

The bats' most distinguishing feature is that their forelimbs are developed as wings, making them the only mammals capable of flight. Bat species account for about 20% of all mammals.

- Family: Vespertilionidae
  - Subfamily: Myotinae
    - Genus: Myotis
      - Bechstein's bat, M. bechsteini NT
      - Greater mouse-eared bat, M. myotis LC
      - Lesser mouse-eared bat, M. blythii LC
      - Brandt's bat, M. brandti LC
      - Cryptic myotis, M. crypticus NT
      - Daubenton's bat, M. daubentonii LC
      - Geoffroy's bat, M. emarginatus LC
      - Natterer's bat, M. nattereri LC
  - Subfamily: Vespertilioninae
    - Genus: Barbastella
      - Barbastelle, B. barbastellus NT
    - Genus: Eptesicus
      - Northern bat, E. nilssoni LC
    - Genus: Nyctalus
      - Greater noctule bat, N. lasiopterus VU
      - Lesser noctule, N. leisleri LC
      - Common noctule, N. noctula LC
    - Genus: Pipistrellus
      - Nathusius' pipistrelle, P. nathusii LC
    - Genus: Plecotus
      - Brown long-eared bat, P. auritus LC
      - Grey long-eared bat, P. austriacus NT
  - Subfamily: Miniopterinae
    - Genus: Miniopterus
      - Common bent-wing bat, M. schreibersii VU
- Family: Molossidae
  - Genus: Tadarida
    - European free-tailed bat, T. teniotis LC
- Family: Rhinolophidae
  - Subfamily: Rhinolophinae
    - Genus: Rhinolophus
      - Greater horseshoe bat, R. ferrumequinum LC
      - Lesser horseshoe bat, R. hipposideros LC

== Order: Carnivora (carnivorans) ==
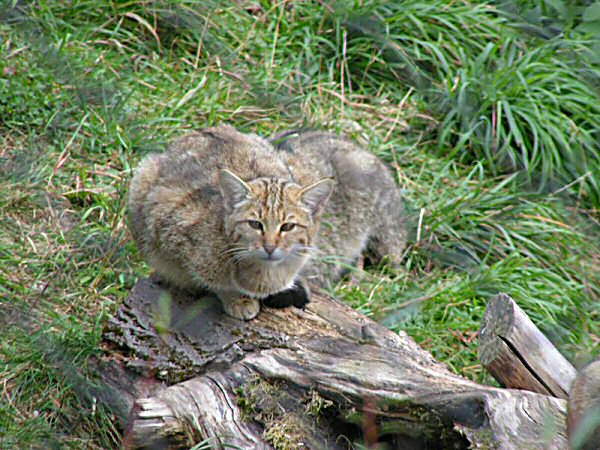
European wildcat

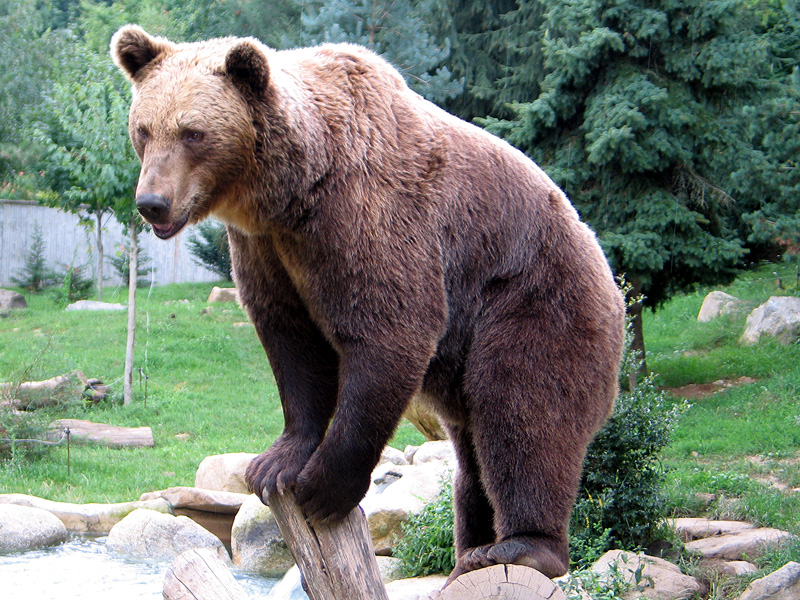
Brown bear

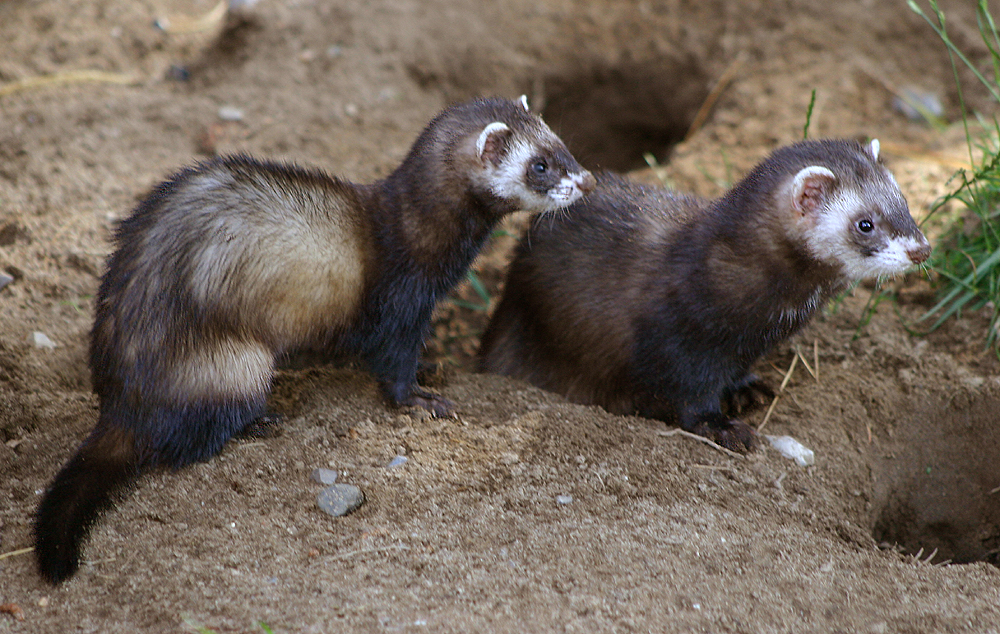
European polecat

There are over 260 species of carnivorans, the majority of which feed primarily on meat. They have a characteristic skull shape and dentition.

- Suborder: Feliformia
  - Family: Felidae (cats)
    - Subfamily: Felinae
      - Genus: Felis
        - European wildcat, F. silvestris LC
      - Genus: Lynx
        - Eurasian lynx, L. lynx LC reintroduced
  - Family: Viverridae
    - Subfamily: Viverrinae
      - Genus: Genetta
        - Common genet, G. genetta LC introduced, presence uncertain
- Suborder: Caniformia
  - Family: Canidae
    - Genus: Canis
      - Gray wolf, C. lupus LC
        - Italian wolf, C. l. italicus
        - Eurasian wolf, C. l. lupus
    - Genus: Vulpes
      - Red fox, V. vulpes LC
  - Family: Ursidae (bears)
    - Genus: Ursus
      - Brown bear, U. arctos LC presence uncertain
        - Eurasian brown bear, U. a. arctos presence uncertain
  - Family: Mustelidae (mustelids)
    - Genus: Mustela
      - Stoat, M. erminea LC
      - European mink, M. lutreola CR extirpated
      - Least weasel, M. nivalis LC
      - European polecat, M. putorius LC
    - Genus: Martes
      - Beech marten, M. foina LC
      - European pine marten, M. martes LC
    - Genus: Meles
      - European badger, M. meles LC
    - Genus: Lutra
      - European otter, L. lutra NT

== Order: Artiodactyla (even-toed ungulates) ==
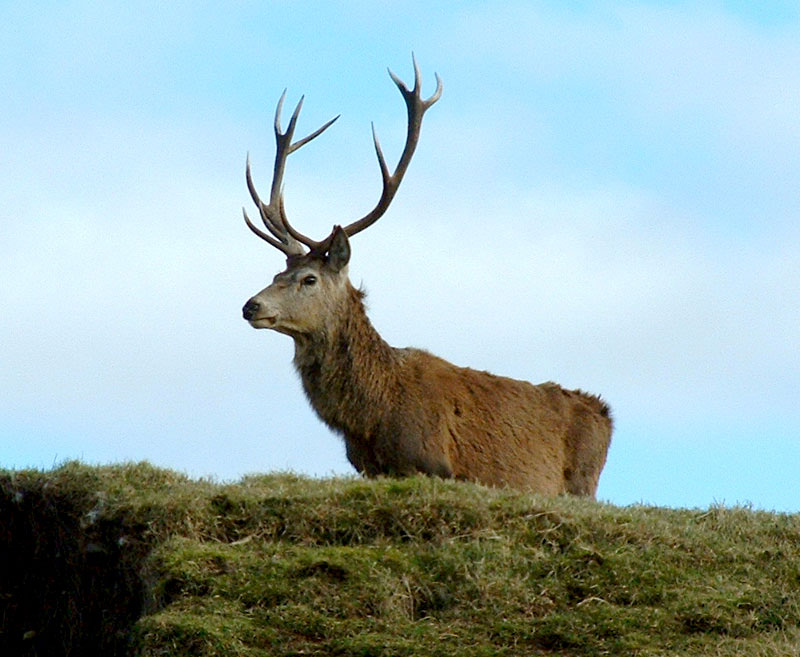
Red deer

The even-toed ungulates are ungulates whose weight is borne about equally by the third and fourth toes, rather than mostly or entirely by the third as in perissodactyls. There are about 220 artiodactyl species, including many that are of great economic importance to humans.

- Family: Bovidae (cattle, antelope, sheep, goats)
  - Subfamily: Bovinae
    - Genus: Bison
      - European bison, B. bonasus NT extirpated
    - Genus: Bos
      - Aurochs, B. primigenius EX
  - Subfamily: Caprinae
    - Genus: Capra
      - Alpine ibex, C. ibex LC reintroduced
    - Genus: Rupicapra
      - Chamois, R. rupicapra LC
- Family: Cervidae (deer)
  - Subfamily: Cervinae
    - Genus: Cervus
      - Red deer, C. elaphus LC
    - Genus: Dama
      - European fallow deer, D. dama LC introduced
  - Subfamily: Capreolinae
    - Genus: Alces
      - Moose, A. alces LC extirpated
    - Genus: Capreolus
      - Roe deer, C. capreolus LC}
- Family: Suidae (pigs)
  - Subfamily: Suinae
    - Genus: Sus
      - Wild boar, S. scrofa LC

== See also ==
- List of chordate orders
- Lists of mammals by region
- List of prehistoric mammals
- Mammal classification
- List of mammals described in the 2000s
- Animal production and consumption in Switzerland
