= Onzui-Chikusa Prefectural Natural Park =

Prefectural Natural Park in Hyōgo Prefecture, Japan

- 音水ちくさ県立自然公園
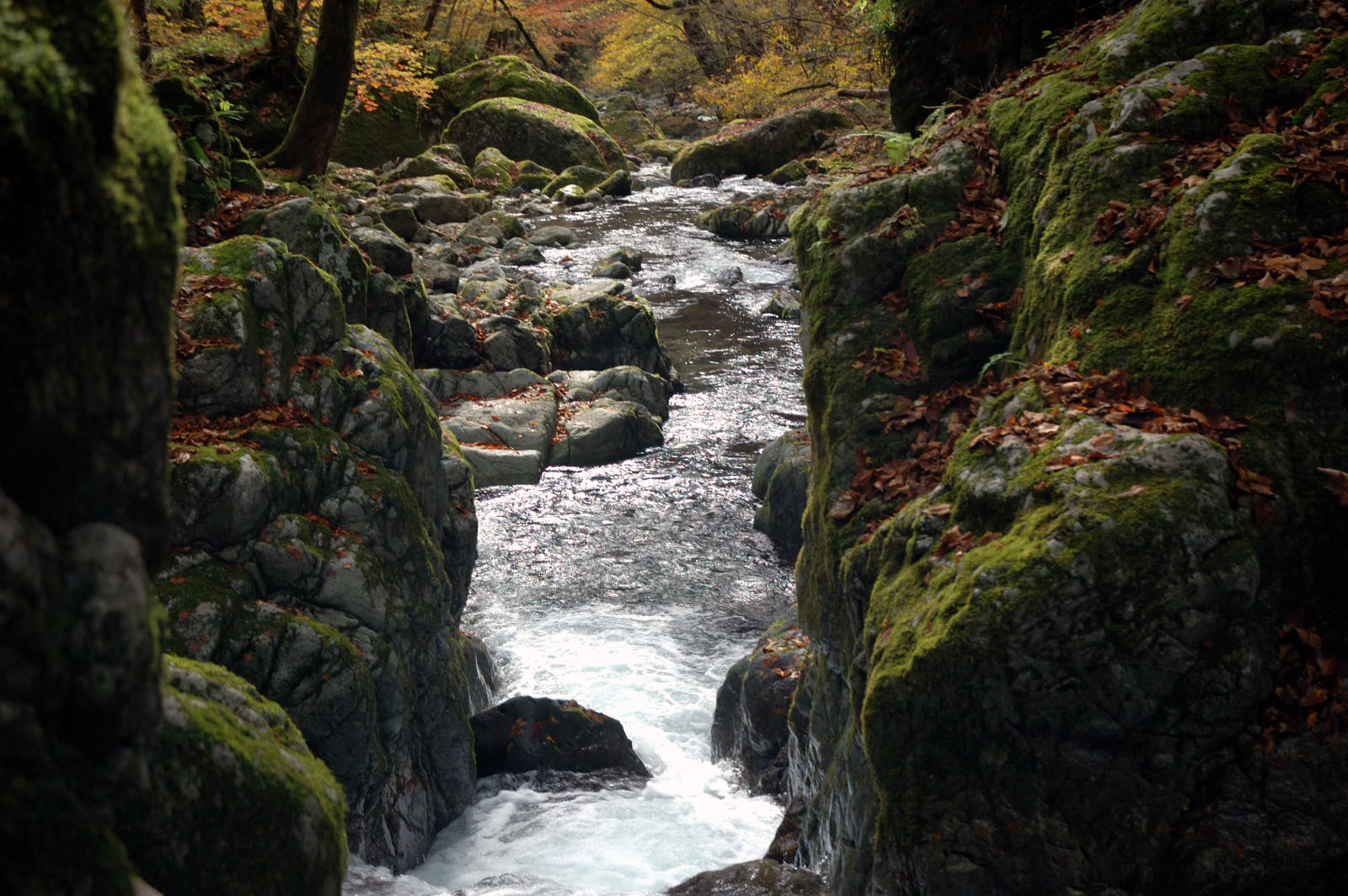
- Onzui Valley
- Interactive map of Onzui-Chikusa Prefectural Natural Park
- Location: Hyōgo Prefecture, Japan
- Area: 97.56 km^{2} (37.67 sq mi)
- Established: 21 November 1958

Onzui-Chikusa Prefectural Natural Park (音水ちくさ県立自然公園, Onzui-Chikusa kenritsu shizen kōen) is a Prefectural Natural Park in western Hyōgo Prefecture, Japan. Established in 1958, the park spans the municipalities of Sayō and Shisō. The area is rich in iron sand and there are remains of a large tatara. Designation of the park helps protect the habitat of the Hida salamander, Japanese giant salamander (Special Natural Monument), golden eagle, black bear, and Japanese dormouse.

== See also ==
- National Parks of Japan
