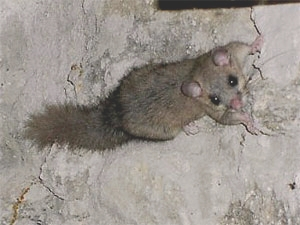
- Glis glis

Scientific classification
- Domain: Eukaryota
- Kingdom: Animalia
- Phylum: Chordata
- Class: Mammalia
- Order: Rodentia
- Family: Gliridae
- Subfamily: Glirinae; Muirhead, 1819

Genera
- Glirulus; Glis †Stertomys

= Glirinae =

Subfamily of rodents

The Glirinae are a subfamily of dormice (Gliridae); it contains two extant genera, one being monotypic and the other containing two species:

Subfamily Glirinae

- Genus Glirulus
  - Japanese dormouse, Glirulus japonicus
- Genus Glis
  - European edible dormouse, Glis glis
  - Iranian edible dormouse, Glis persicus
