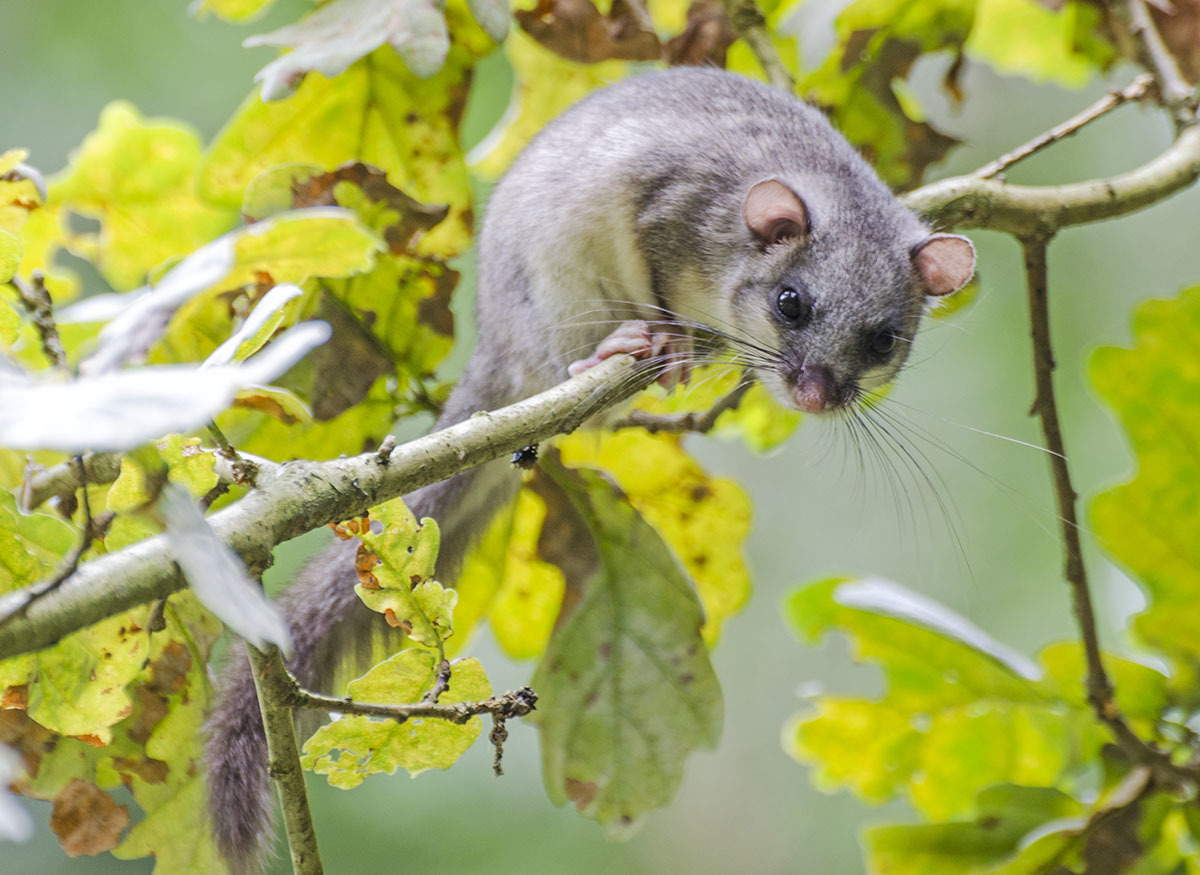
- Kurmiškė, Lithuania

Conservation status
- Least Concern (IUCN 3.1)

Scientific classification
- Kingdom: Animalia
- Phylum: Chordata
- Class: Mammalia
- Order: Rodentia
- Family: Gliridae
- Subfamily: Glirinae
- Genus: Glis
- Species: G. glis

Binomial name
- Glis glis (Linnaeus, 1766)
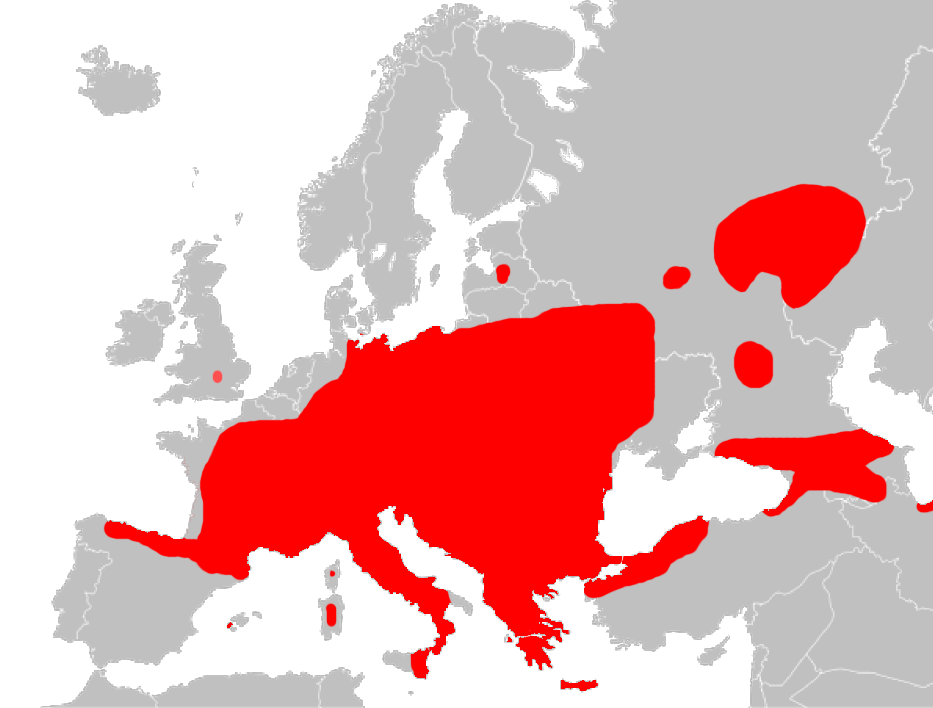
- European edible dormouse range (including portion of range of G. persicus in lower right)

Synonyms
- Sciurus glis Linnaeus, 1766; Myoxus glis (Linnaeus, 1766)

= European edible dormouse =

Edible dormouse Temporal range: Pleistocene–recent

Species of rodent

The European edible dormouse (Glis glis), also known as the European dormouse or European fat dormouse, is a large dormouse and one of only two living species in the genus Glis, found in most of Europe and parts of western Asia. The common name comes from the Romans, who ate them as a delicacy.

== Etymology ==
The word dormouse comes from Middle English dormous, of uncertain origin, possibly from a dialectal *dor-, from Old Norse dár 'benumbed' and Middle English mous 'mouse'.

The word is sometimes conjectured to come from an Anglo-Norman derivative of dormir 'to sleep', with the second element mistaken for mouse, but no such Anglo-Norman term is known to have existed.

The Latin word glis, which is the origin of the scientific name, is from the Proto-Indo-European root *gl̥h₁éys 'weasel, mouse', related to Sanskrit गिरि girí 'mouse' and Ancient Greek γαλέη galéē 'weasel'.

== Description ==
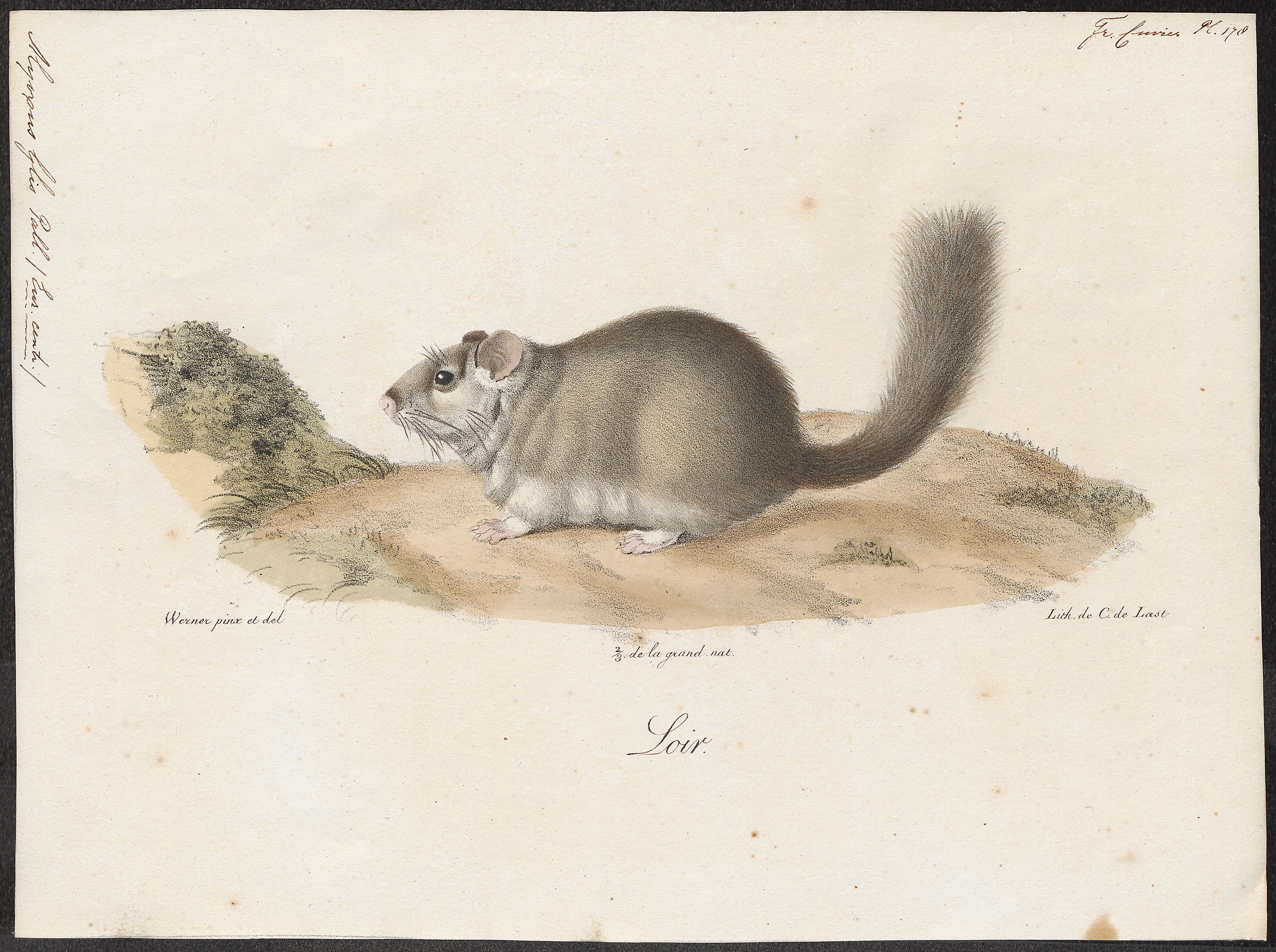
19th century illustration of Myoxus glis from Iconographia Zoologica

The European edible dormouse is the largest of all extant dormice, being around 14 to 19 cm (5.5 to 7.5 in) in head-body length, plus an 11- to 13-cm-long tail. It normally weighs from 120 to 150 g (4.2 to 5.3 oz), but may almost double in weight immediately prior to hibernation. It has a generally squirrel-like body, with small ears, short legs, and large feet. Its fur is grey to greyish-brown in colour over most of the body, while the underparts and the inner surface of legs are white to pale buff; the line of demarcation is rather well defined.

Unlike most other dormice, they have no dark markings on the face, aside from faint rings around the eyes. The tail is long and bushy, with fur slightly darker than that on the body. Front feet have four digits and their hind feet have five. The soles of their feet are naked. Females have from four to six pairs of teats.

The edible dormouse is capable of limited autotomy; if another animal grasps the tail, the skin breaks easily and slides off the underlying bone, allowing the dormouse to escape. The exposed vertebrae then break off and the wound heals over, forming a fresh brush of hair.

== Distribution ==
The edible dormouse is found throughout much of mainland western Europe. It is also found on a number of Mediterranean islands, including Sardinia, Corsica, Sicily, and Crete. It is rather more sparsely distributed through central and southeastern Europe, but can be found as far northeast as the upper Volga River, i.e. in the Zhiguli Mountains of western Russia. They are also found in the Caucasus region. A 1997 study found that the population density of German populations in studied forests varied from 2.3 to 6 individuals per hectare, while in the Caucasus the density has been found to be up to 30 individuals per hectare.

It is also found in scattered populations throughout Thrace, a region in southeastern Europe along the Aegean and Black Seas. In this region, two subspecies of the edible dormouse are found, G. g. glis and G. g. orientalis. Northern Anatolia has a different subspecies, G. g. pindicus.

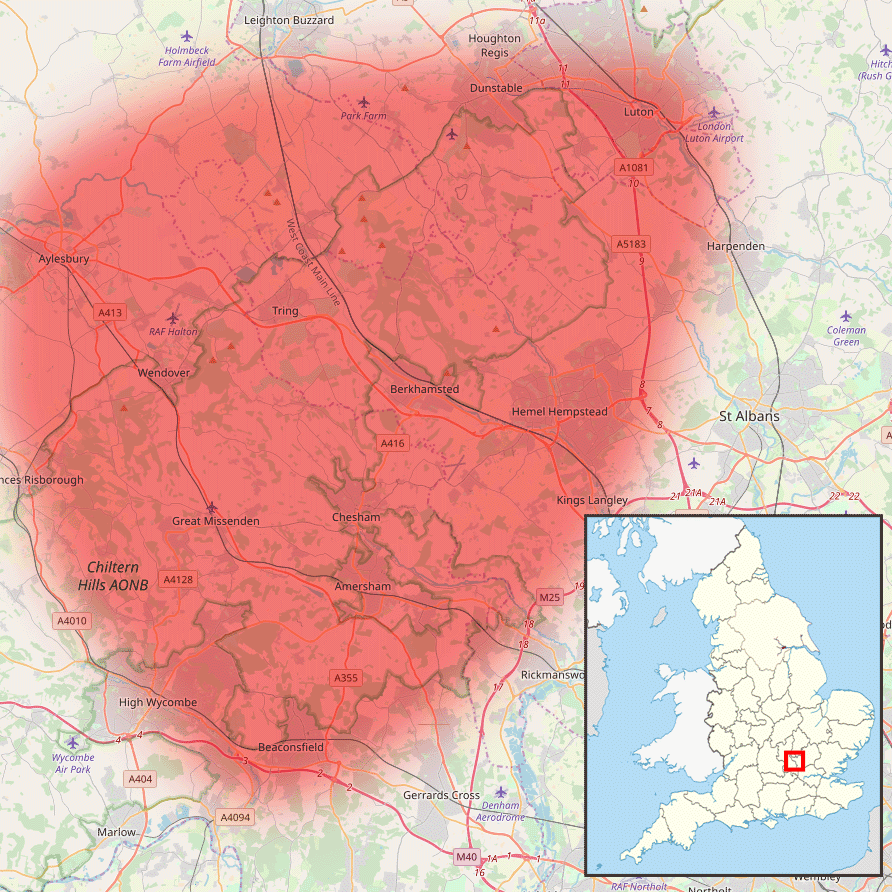
Map showing approximate distribution of Glis glis in England

A small, isolated population of Glis glis also exists in southeast England. At the turn of the 20th century, the British banker and zoologist Lionel Walter Rothschild kept Glis glis in his private collection in the town of Tring in Hertfordshire; in 1902 some of the animals escaped and reproduced, establishing themselves in the wild as an invasive species. Today, the British edible dormouse population is thought to be 10,000 strong, and Glis glis have been recorded in a 25-kilometre (16-mile) radius of Tring, mostly concentrated to the south and east, comprising a 200-square-mile (520 km^{2}) triangle between Beaconsfield, Aylesbury, and Luton, around the southeast side of the Chiltern Hills. A 2003 study suggested that the population density of the introduced British population was considerably lower than mainland populations.

A distinct group of dormice ranging from along the coastline of the Caspian Sea from southernmost Azerbaijan east through Iran to Turkmenistan, was formerly classified in G. glis. However, phylogenetic analysis found it to be a distinct species, the Iranian edible dormouse (Glis persicus). Significant divergence has also been noted among other populations of G. glis, probably as a consequence of the Messinian salinity crisis, and more species will probably be split in the future.

== Ecology and habitat ==
Edible dormice inhabit deciduous forests dominated by oak and beech, from sea level to the upper limits of such forests at 1,500 to 2,000 m (4,900 to 6,600 ft). They prefer dense forests with rocky cliffs and caves, but may be found in maquis vegetation, orchards, and urban margins. They have frequently been reported from caves as deep as 400 m (1,300 ft), where they can shelter from predators.

Population densities range from two to 22 individuals per hectare. Females inhabit only very small home ranges, of 0.15 to 0.76 ha (0.37 to 1.88 acres), but males occupy much larger ranges of 0.8 to 7 ha (2.0 to 17.3 acres), with several burrows.

Unlike other glirids, which are generally omnivorous, the edible dormouse has been described as purely herbivorous. Beech mast, which is rich in energy and protein, is an excellent source of food for young and lactating females. Some dormice are found to have hair and ectoparasite remains in their stomachs, but this is mainly due to accidental ingestion during grooming.

Edible dormice also consume large numbers of beech tree seeds. A single, large, seeding tree within the home range of a dormouse can produce enough resources to support the energy requirements of reproduction. The location and age of a beech tree helps dictate where a population of dormice live, since older trees produce more seeds.

== Behaviour ==
Edible dormice are nocturnal, spending the day in nests taken from birds, or located in hollow trees or similar shelter. They are good climbers, and spend most of their time in the trees, although they are relatively poor jumpers. The dormouse uses sticky secretions of plantar glands when they are climbing on smooth surfaces to prevent them from falling. They generally stay in the forest and avoid open areas to any extent. They are not generally social animals, although small groups of closely related adults have occasionally been reported. Many edible dormice mothers form communal nesting areas where they care for their young together.

Communication is partly by sound, with the animals making various squeaks or snuffling sounds, and partly by scent. They leave scent trails from scent glands on their feet, as well as glands at the top of their tails by the anus. They rub their anal region on the ground and places they walk, so traces of the secretion will be left for other dormice, especially during periods of sexual activity.

Edible dormice are active during a six-month period and go into hibernation from roughly October to May, depending on local climatic conditions. They are mostly active in the summer and are active on average 202 min in a 24-hour day, mostly at night. They prepare a den in soft soil or hidden in a cave, and rely on fat reserves to survive through the winter. During hibernation, metabolic rate and body temperature fall dramatically, and the animal may cease breathing altogether for periods up to an hour. In years with low food availability edible dormice can hibernate longer than 11 months.

In the wild most edible dormice hibernate for three winters, and then die in the fourth while hibernating, when their cheek teeth are worn out to a degree that prevents normal mastication of food.

Their primary predators include owls, snakes, foxes, pine martens, weasels, and wildcats.

== Reproduction ==
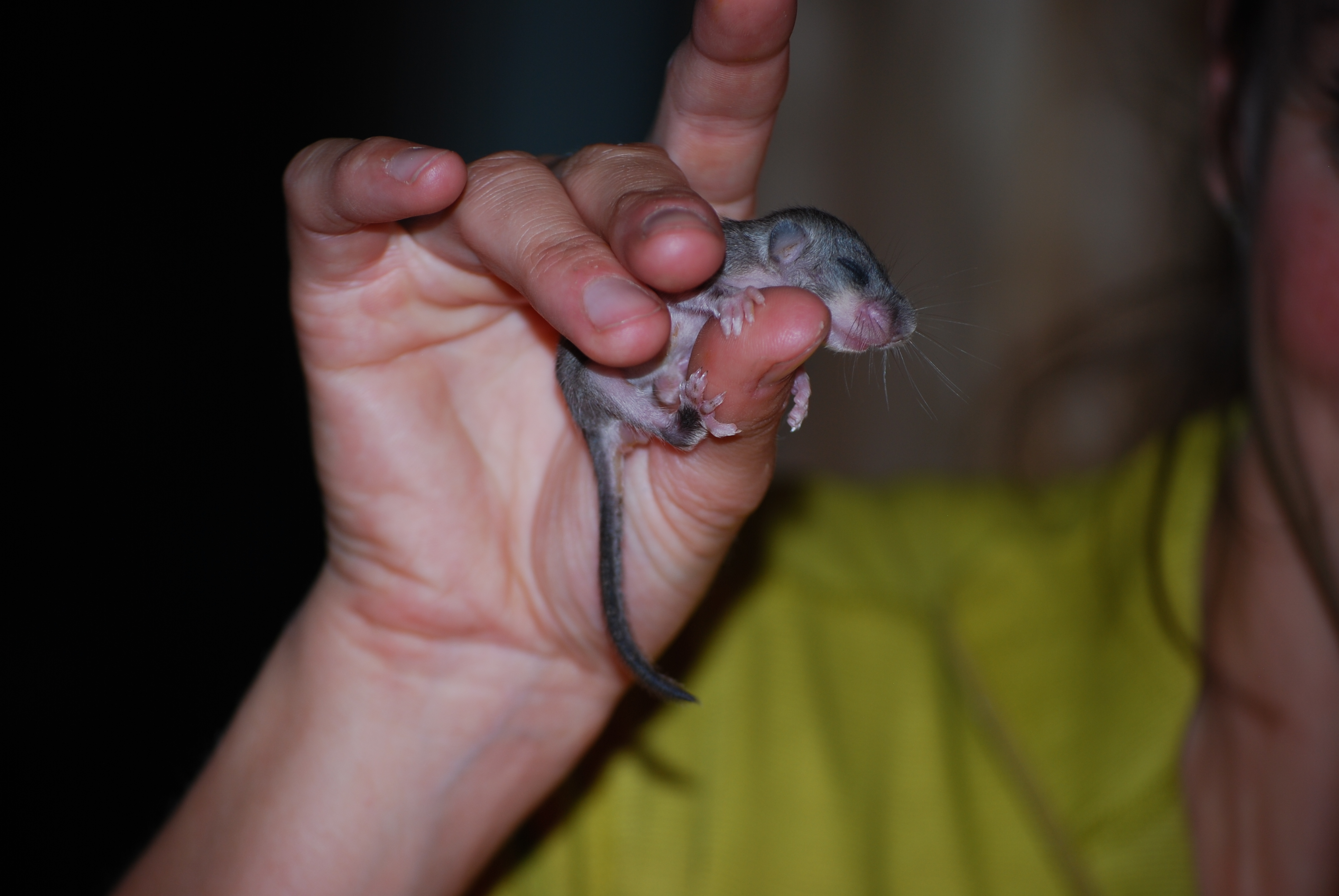
A juvenile European edible dormouse

The breeding season is from late June to mid August, but both male and female dormice do not reproduce every year. Variation in food resources strongly influences reproduction because reproduction is tightly linked to the availability of energy-rich seeds. Therefore, edible dormice breed during the phase of high food availability. Females are able to produce additional young if amino acid-rich foods like inflorescences, unripe seeds, and (or) larval insects, which also increase their numbers by eating the same enriched plant food, are available. An abundance of energy-rich seeds allows newborn dormice to increase their body fat to prepare for their first hibernation. Edible dormice have adapted their life history strategies to maximize lifetime reproductive success depending on the area specific frequency of seeding events of trees producing energy-rich seeds. Females reach sexual maturity at 351–380 days old and males significantly lower their body mass during mating season.

Males are not territorial, and may visit the territories of several nearby females to mate, becoming aggressive to any other males they encounter. The male attracts a female by squeaking, then conducts a circular courtship dance before mounting her. During mating season, males lower their body mass and use their body fat reserves to help fuel the energetic costs of reproduction.

Gestation lasts from 20 to 31 days, and results in the birth of up to 11 young, although four or five are more typical. They develop their fur by 16 days, and open their eyes after around 3 weeks. They begin to leave the nest after around 30 days, and are sexually mature by the time they complete their second hibernation. Compared with similarly sized mammals, they have an unusually long lifespan, and have been reported to live up to 12 years in the wild.

The breeding habits of the edible dormouse have been cited as a possible cause of its unusual pattern of telomere lengthening with age. In humans and other animals, telomeres almost always shorten with age.

== Evolution ==
Although the edible dormouse is the only living member of its genus, a number of fossil species are also known. The genus Glis first originated in the middle Oligocene, although it did not become common until the Pliocene. By the Pleistocene, only one species, G. sackdillingensis, is known to have survived, and this is likely the ancestor of the modern species, which first appeared in the early to mid-Pleistocene.

Edible dormice that have been isolated on oceanic islands are a prime example of insular gigantism, in which small animals in isolated locations become larger over the course of many generations. Although it is not known why, the number of teats on a female edible dormouse varies across regions of Europe. For example, those in Italy have two to seven, while those in Lithuania have three to six.

== Interaction with humans ==
=== As a pest ===
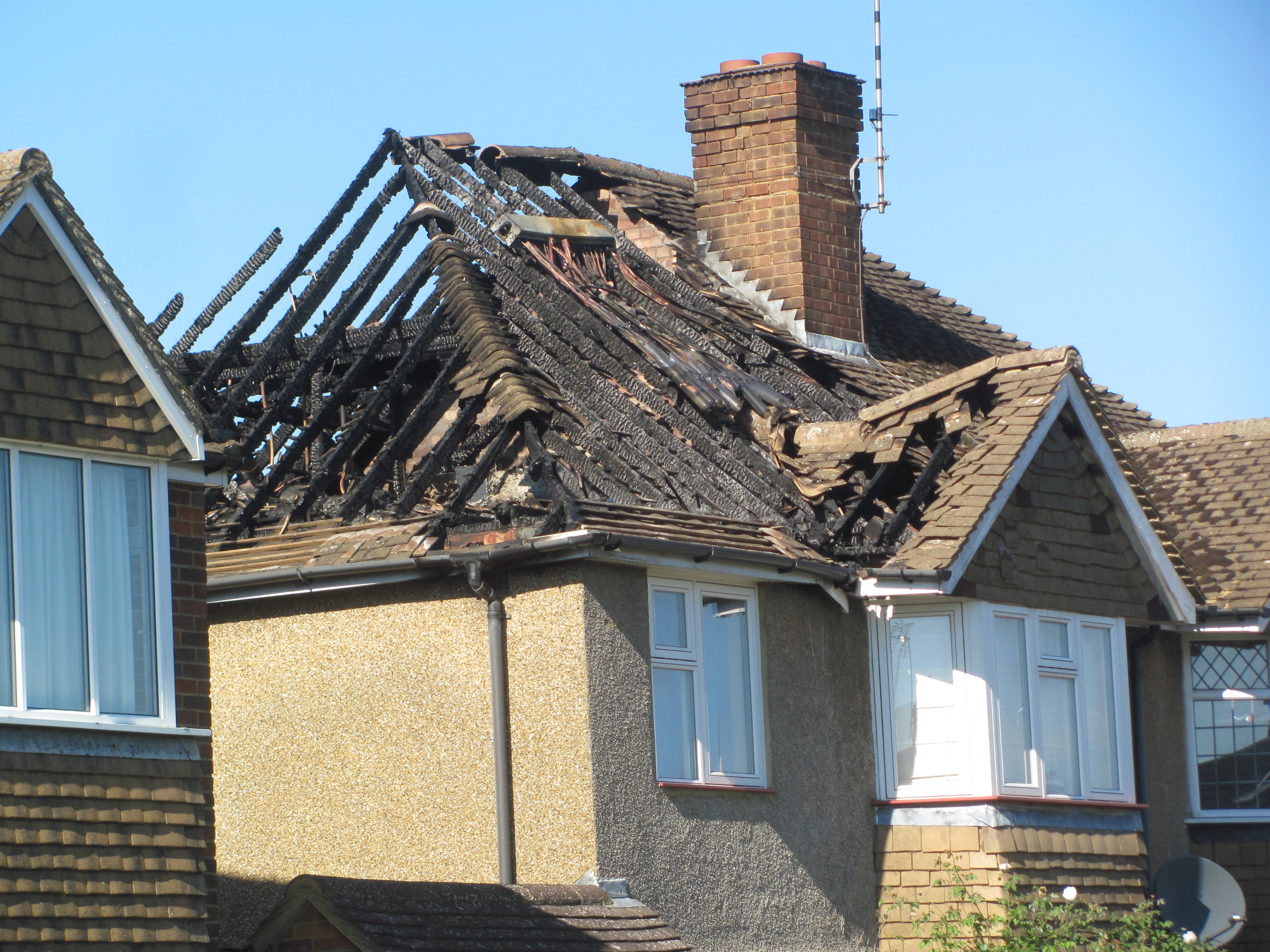
A house in Tring, Hertfordshire, England, damaged by a fire attributed to Glis glis in 2015

Glis glis have adapted well to the presence of humans and now frequently hibernate in insulated attics and even dark shelves in cupboards, particularly if soft materials are on the shelf to make a nest. In this situation, they are generally regarded as a pest due to the fire risk from gnawed electrical cables and fouling from their faeces. Instances of house fire have been attributed to electrical fires caused by wires chewed by Glis glis, and a three-day internet outage across Tring in August 2023 was attributed to the activity of Glis glis chewing through the broadband cable.

Despite being regarded as a pest in the United Kingdom, the Wildlife and Countryside Act 1981 prohibits certain methods of killing dormice. This is because the Gliridae family of rodents is protected internationally under the Berne Convention on the Conservation of European Wildlife and Natural Habitats, to which the United Kingdom is a signatory. Removing edible dormice from a property may only be carried out by a qualified pest controller licensed by Natural England using live traps. The animals must then be humanely killed after capture. In the long term, an individual trap strategy may be not sustainable if it is not integrated with other preventive tools.

When present in large numbers, edible dormice may cause damage to orchards and be considered pests. In 2018 the published estimate for the UK population was 23,000, based on density estimates of under 1 per hectare from one to two decades ago. This differs from other independent recent estimates, however, by at least an order of magnitude, i.e. 10-20+ adults per hectare, which suggest a figure of 230,000 - 460,000+.

=== As food ===
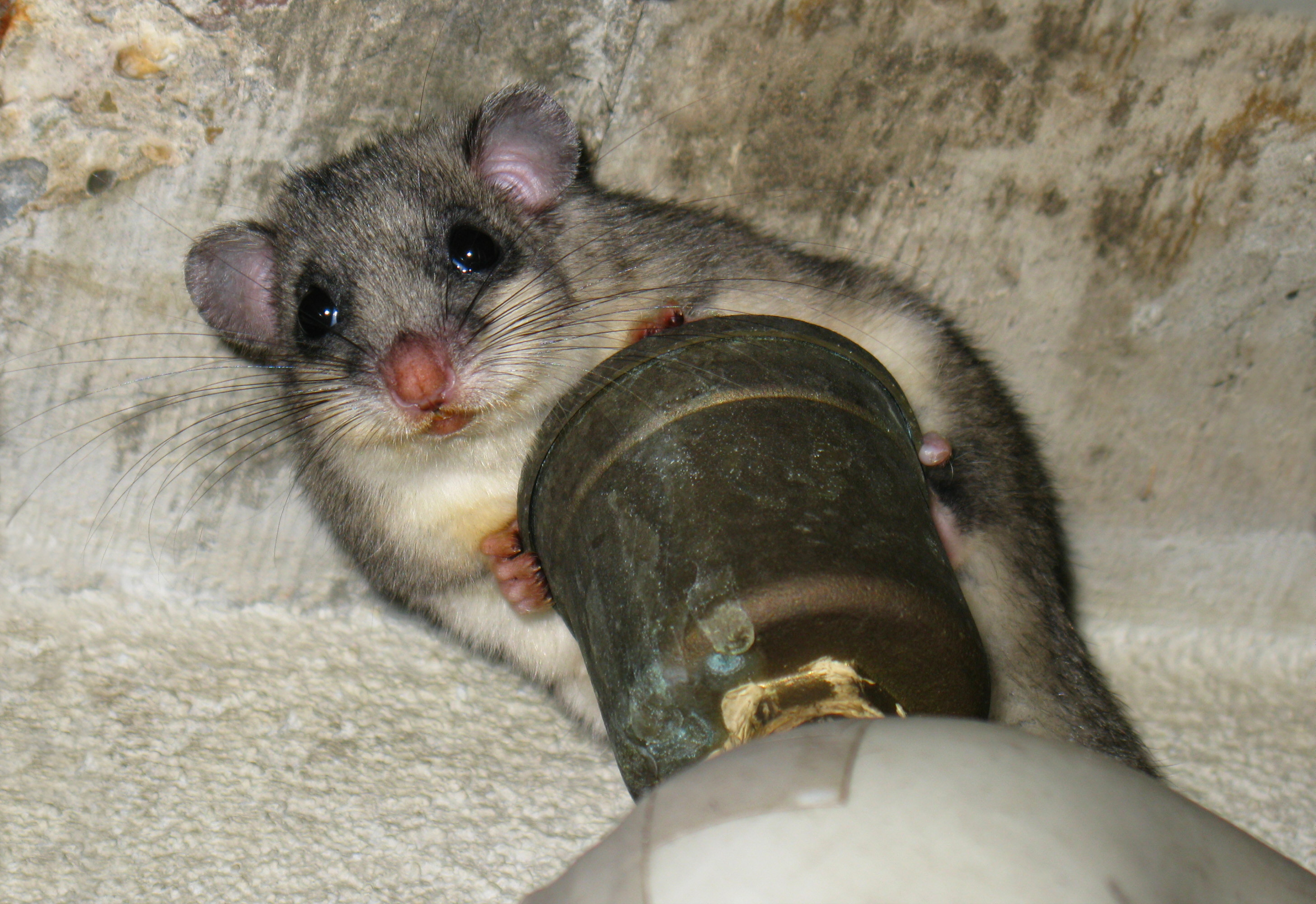
Edible dormouse in a cellar

The edible dormouse was farmed and eaten by the ancient Romans, the Gauls, and the Etruscans (usually as a snack), hence the word edible in its name. The Romans would catch dormice from the wild in autumn when they were fattest. The dormice were kept and raised either in large pits or (in less spacious urban surroundings) in terra cotta containers, gliraria, similar to contemporary hamster cages. They fed these captive dormice walnuts, chestnuts, and acorns for fattening. The dormice were served by either roasting them and dipping them in honey or stuffing them with a mixture of pork, pine nuts, and other flavorings. It was, however, very important to upper-class Romans that the dormice be separated from other products of the hunt, like the large game, for presentation purposes.

Wild edible dormice are still consumed in Slovenia, where they are considered a rare delicacy and dormouse trapping is a tradition. The Slovenes use several methods of trapping. The first used were the hollow-tree trapping method and the flat-stone trapping method. By the 17th century, the peasant trappers had invented the first self-triggering traps, usually made of different kinds of wood. In the 19th century, traps made from iron and steel were introduced. The trappers used many different types of bait to entice the dormice, ranging from pieces of fruit to bacon soaked in brandy. During the prime season, trappers could catch between 200 and 400 dormice, depending largely on what kind of trap they were using. Seasonal dormice feasts were welcome protein supplements for the impoverished peasantry. The people of Slovenia did not just catch the dormice for their meat: use of dormice for food and fur and of dormouse fat as an ointment is documented there since the 13th century. It was also documented by the polymath Valvasor and other Carniolan writers. The taste of dormouse is described as "very similar to squirrel, with a rich, greasy flavor and only a few mouthfuls of meat on each one."
