= Glirarium =

Roman container for live dormice

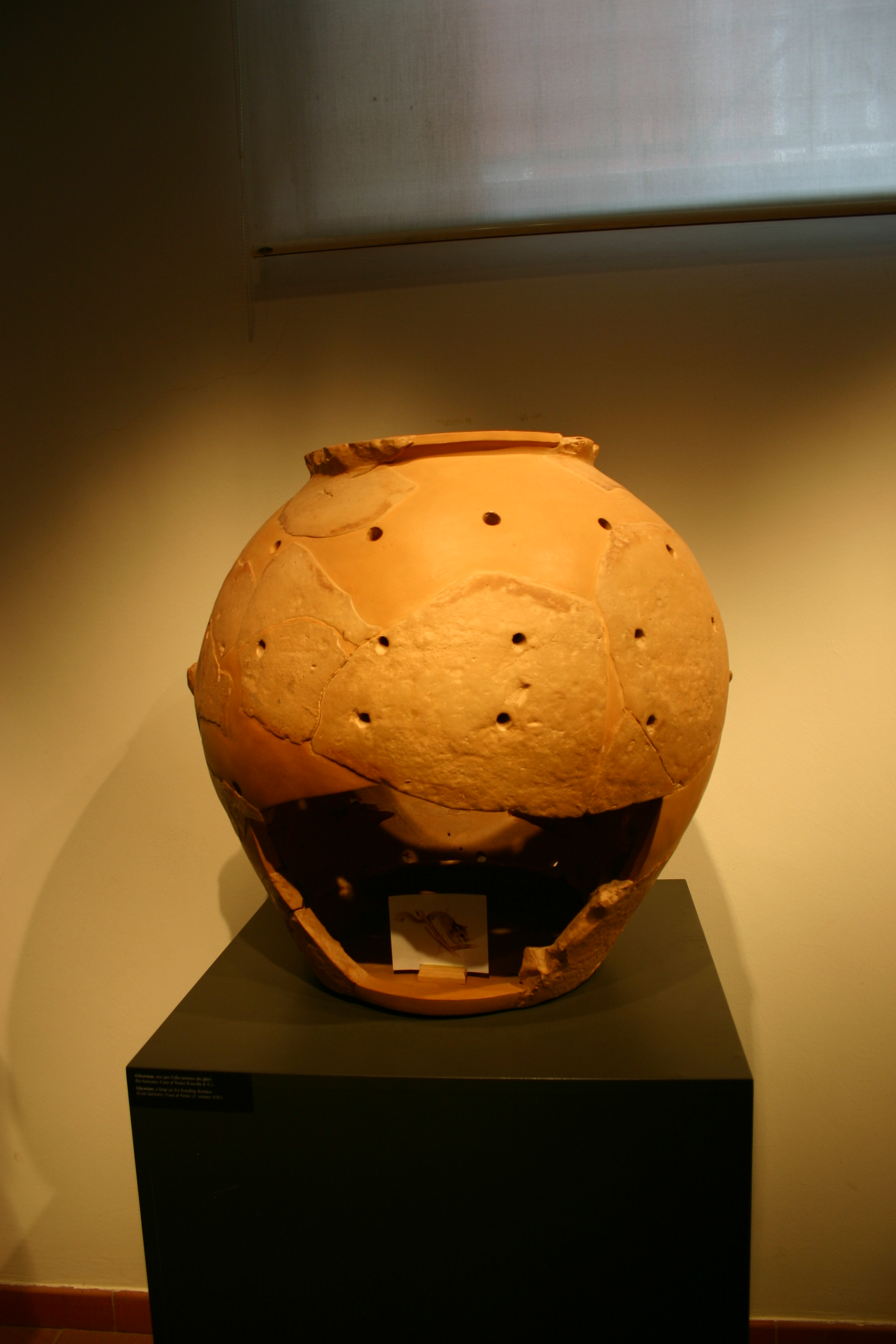
A glirarium exhibited at the National Archaeological Museum in Chiusi.

A glirarium is a terracotta container used for keeping edible dormice. These animals were considered a delicacy in the Etruscan period and later in the Roman Empire.

== Description ==
The container consists of a vessel, usually in terracotta, perforated to allow the passage of air, polished on the inside to prevent escape, and with a lid to seal the top. Inside, there are two or more shelves placed against the vessel walls and additional holes in the bottom of the vessel, generally more numerous than those on the sides. By inducing hibernation via darkness and confinement, the glirarium would cause the dormouse to fatten.
