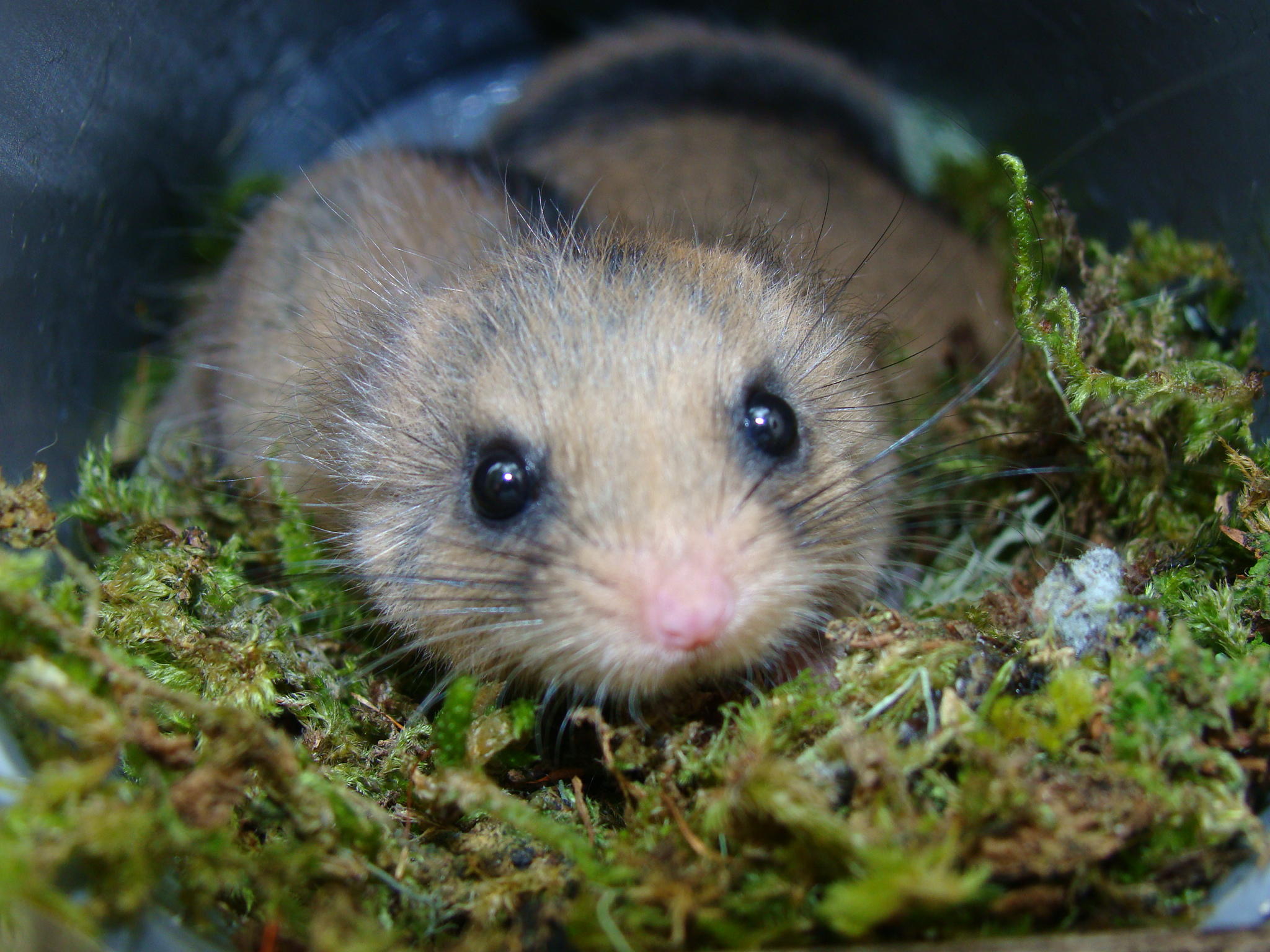
- Japanese dormouse (Glirulus japonicus)

Scientific classification
- Kingdom: Animalia
- Phylum: Chordata
- Class: Mammalia
- Infraclass: Placentalia
- Order: Rodentia
- Family: Gliridae
- Subfamily: Glirinae
- Genus: Glirulus; Thomas, 1906

Type species
- Myoxus japonicus Schinz, 1845

Species
- Glirulus japonicus; †Glirulus conjunctus; †Glirulus diremptus; †Glirulus ekremi; †Glirulus lissiensis; †Glirulus minor; †Glirulus pusillus

= Glirulus =

Glirulus Temporal range: Miocene - Recent

Genus of rodent

Glirulus is a genus of dormouse. The only extant species is the Japanese dormouse (Glirulus japonicus) but fossil species indicate that the genus was widespread in Europe in the past.
