= Iranian edible dormouse =

Scientific classification
- Kingdom: Animalia
- Phylum: Chordata
- Class: Mammalia
- Order: Rodentia
- Family: Gliridae
- Genus: Glis
- Species: G. persicus

Binomial name
- Glis persicus (Erxleben, 1777)

Species of mouse

The Iranian edible dormouse or Iranian fat dormouse (Glis persicus) is a species of dormouse native to Western and Central Asia. It is one of only two extant species in the genus Glis.

== Taxonomy ==
It was long considered conspecific with the European edible dormouse (G. glis) until a 2021 phylogenetic study supported it being a distinct species. The American Society of Mammalogists has accepted these results.

It is thought to have diverged from G. glis during a fragmentation of the ancestral Glis population (likely triggered by the Messinian salinity crisis) during the late Miocene, about 5.74 million years ago. Despite being restricted to a relatively small refugium on the southern coast of the Caspian Sea, it managed to persist in this refugium for millions of years, throughout all of the Pliocene and the glacial-interglacial dynamics of the Pleistocene.

Significant genetic divergence also occurs within this species; populations from eastern Iran and western Iran display a deep divergence of about 1.19 million years ago. This indicates that further splitting is likely within G. persicus.

== Distribution ==
It is restricted to the Caspian Hyrcanian mixed forests ecoregion, which served as a likely refugium for it during the original range fragmentation of Glis. It ranges from southernmost Azerbaijan to throughout most of Iran's Caspian Sea coast, and into Turkmenistan.

== Description ==
Most members of this species have a largely black tail, in contrast to the greyish tails of most of G. glis (aside from Italian populations, which also have blackish tails).
