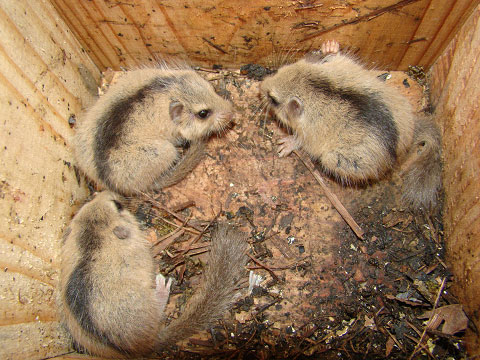

Conservation status
- Least Concern (IUCN 3.1)

Scientific classification
- Kingdom: Animalia
- Phylum: Chordata
- Class: Mammalia
- Order: Rodentia
- Family: Gliridae
- Subfamily: Glirinae
- Genus: Glirulus
- Species: G. japonicus

Binomial name
- Glirulus japonicus (Schinz, 1845)
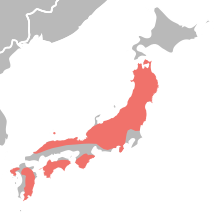
- Glirulus japonicus distribution

= Japanese dormouse =

Species of rodent

The Japanese dormouse (Glirulus japonicus) is a species of rodent in the family Gliridae endemic to Japan. It is the only extant species within the genus Glirulus. Its natural habitat is temperate forests. In Japanese, it is called yamane (やまね or 山鼠). Among dormice, it has the special ability of running at great speed upside down, suspended from branches. Its main food is fruit, insects, berries, nuts, and even flowers. It tends to inhabit arboreal nesting sites to avoid interspecific competition with the small Japanese field mouse (Apodemus argenteus) because of their sympatric relationship.

== Description ==
Japanese dormice have a similar appearance to squirrels and mice. Japanese dormice are some of the smallest types of dormice only weighing up to 40 grams, with the body being less than 8 centimetres (3 in) long and the tail being up to 6 centimetres (2 in). Japanese dormice live for 2-5 years.

== Behavior ==
=== Diet ===
Japanese dormice are omnivores and have a diet mainly consisting of fruits, berries, nuts, insects, and even flowers. Japanese dormice diet also consists of spiders, bird eggs and nestlings, other small rodents and even other dormice.
