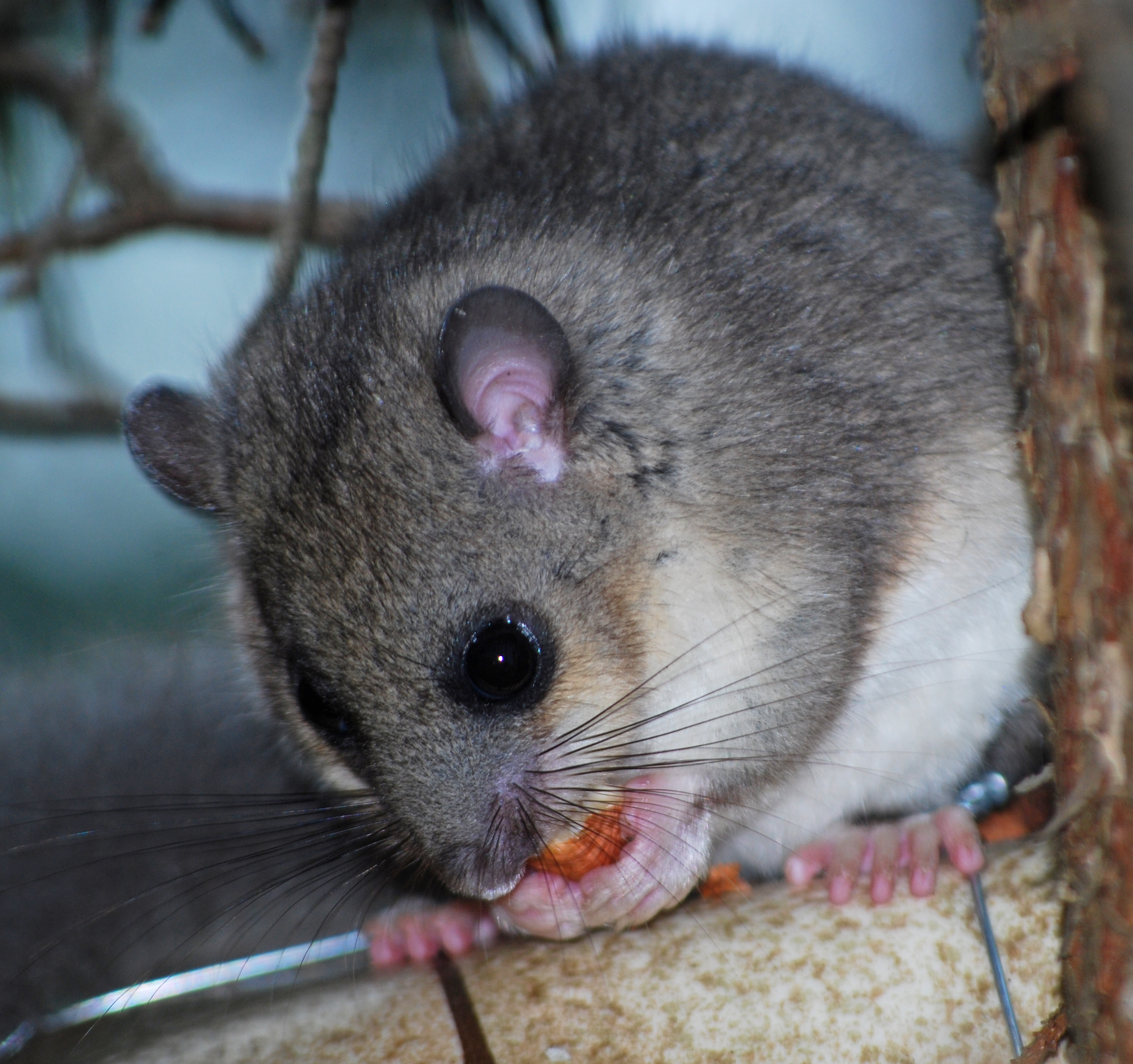
- European edible dormouse (Glis glis)

Scientific classification
- Kingdom: Animalia
- Phylum: Chordata
- Class: Mammalia
- Order: Rodentia
- Family: Gliridae
- Subfamily: Glirinae
- Genus: Glis; Brisson, 1762

Type species
- Sciurus glis Linnaeus, 1766

Species
- Glis glis; Glis persicus; †Glis apertus; †Glis galitopouli; †Glis guerbuezi; †Glis major; †Glis minor; †Glis sackdillingensis; †Glis sussenbornensis; †Glis transversus; †Glis vallesiensis

= Glis (genus) =

Glis Temporal range: Oligocene - Recent

Genus of rodent

Glis is a genus of rodent that contains two extant species, both known as edible dormice or fat dormice: the European edible dormouse (Glis glis) and the Iranian edible dormouse (Glis persicus). It also contains a number of fossil species.

== Evolution ==
The genus Glis originated in the mid-Oligocene. It did not become common until the Pliocene. Only one species, Glis sackdillingensis is known to have survived into the Pleistocene. This is probably likely the ancestor of the modern species, which appeared in the early to mid-Pleistocene.

One former species, Glis truyolsi, has been placed in the genus Myoglis and it has been suggested that G. apertus, G. galitopouli, G. guerbuezi, G. major and G. transversus be moved there as well.

== Etymology ==
The first mention of the word dormouse was in the early 15th century, possibly coming from Anglo-French *dormouse "tending to be dormant" (from stem of dormir "to sleep," see dormant), with the second element mistaken for mouse; or perhaps it is from a Middle English dialectal compound of mouse (n.) and French dormir. French dormeuse, fem. of dormeur "sleeper" is attested only from 17c.
