= Kurmiškė (Varėna) =

Coordinates: 54°11′30″N 24°12′30″E

- Village
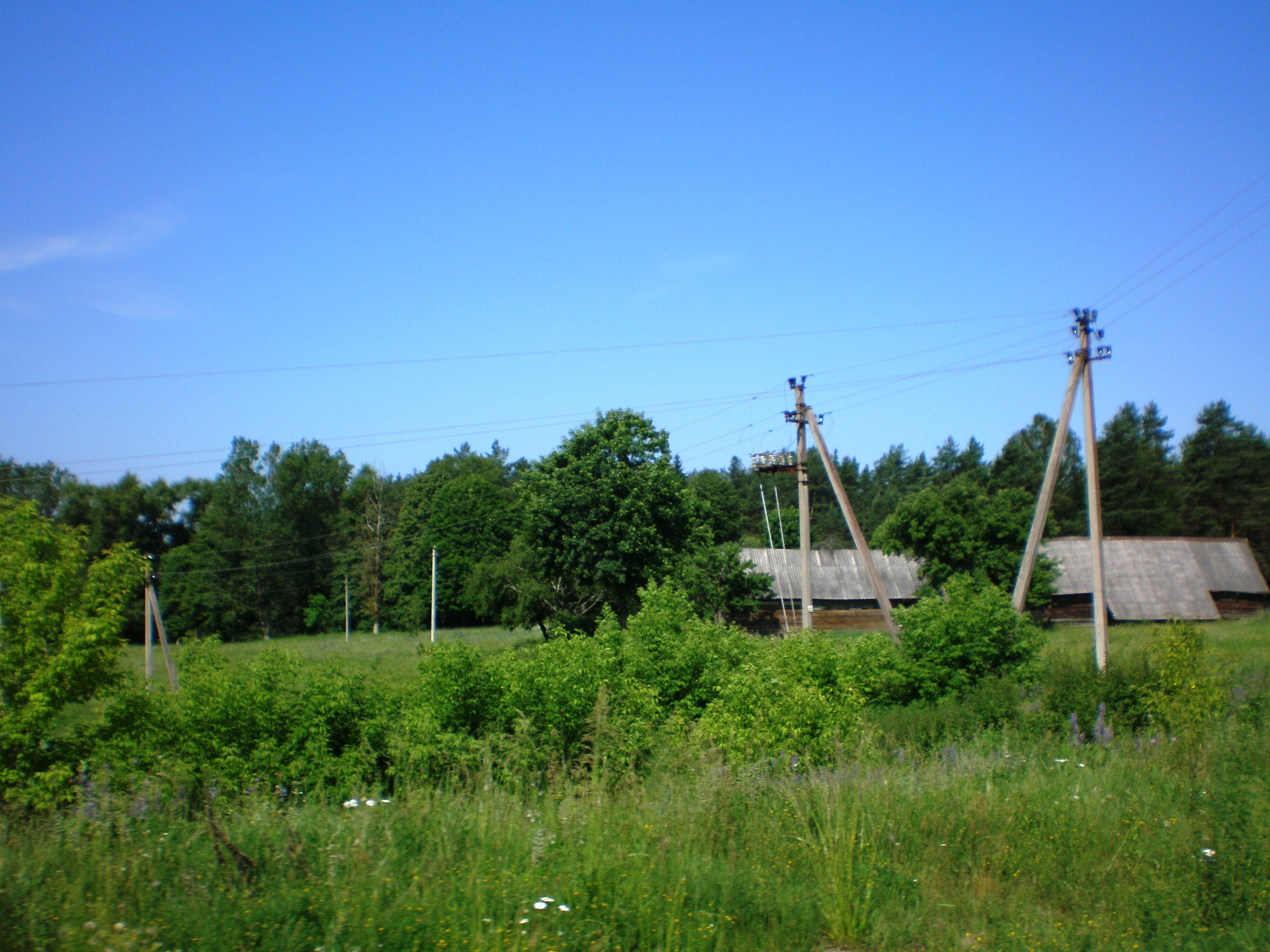
- Interactive map of Kurmiškė (Varėna)
- Country: Lithuania
- County: Alytus County
- Municipality: Varėna

Population (2001)
  - Total: 10
- Time zone: UTC+2 (EET)
  - Summer (DST): UTC+3 (EEST)

Kurmiškė (Varėna) is a village in Varėna district municipality, in Alytus County, in southeastern Lithuania. According to the 2001 census, the village has a population of 10 people.
