= Pest (organism) =

Organism harmful to human concerns

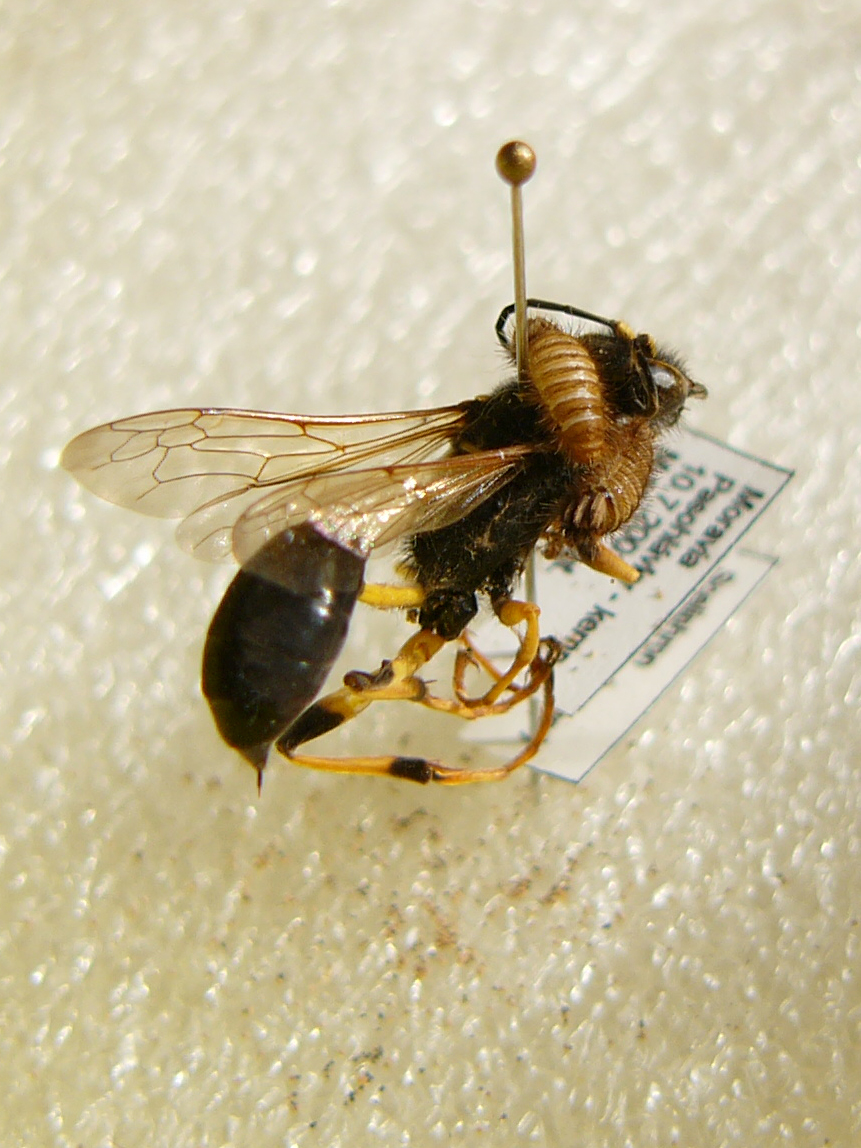
Varied carpet beetle larvae, Anthrenus verbasci, damaging a specimen of Sceliphron destillatorius in an entomological collection

A pest is any organism harmful to humans or human concerns. The term is particularly used for creatures that damage crops, livestock, and forestry or cause a nuisance to people, especially in their homes. Humans have modified the environment for their own purposes and are intolerant of other creatures occupying the same space when their activities impact adversely on human objectives. Thus, an elephant is unobjectionable in its natural habitat but a pest when it tramples crops.

Some animals are disliked because they bite or sting; wolves, snakes, wasps, ants, bees, bed bugs, mosquitos, fleas and ticks belong in this category. Others enter the home; these include houseflies, which land on and contaminate food; beetles, which tunnel into the woodwork; and other animals that scuttle about on the floor at night, like rats, mice, and cockroaches, which are often associated with unsanitary conditions.

Agricultural and horticultural crops are attacked by a wide variety of pests, the most important being rodents, insects, mites, nematodes and gastropod molluscs. The damage they do results both from the direct injury they cause to the plants and from the indirect consequences of the fungal, bacterial or viral infections they transmit. Plants have their own defences against these attacks but these may be overwhelmed, especially in habitats where the plants are already stressed, or where the pests have been accidentally introduced and may have no natural enemies. The pests affecting trees are predominantly insects, and many of these have also been introduced inadvertently and lack natural enemies, and some have transmitted novel fungal diseases with devastating results.

Humans have traditionally performed pest control in agriculture and forestry by the use of pesticides; however, other methods exist such as mechanical control, and recently developed biological controls.

== Concept ==
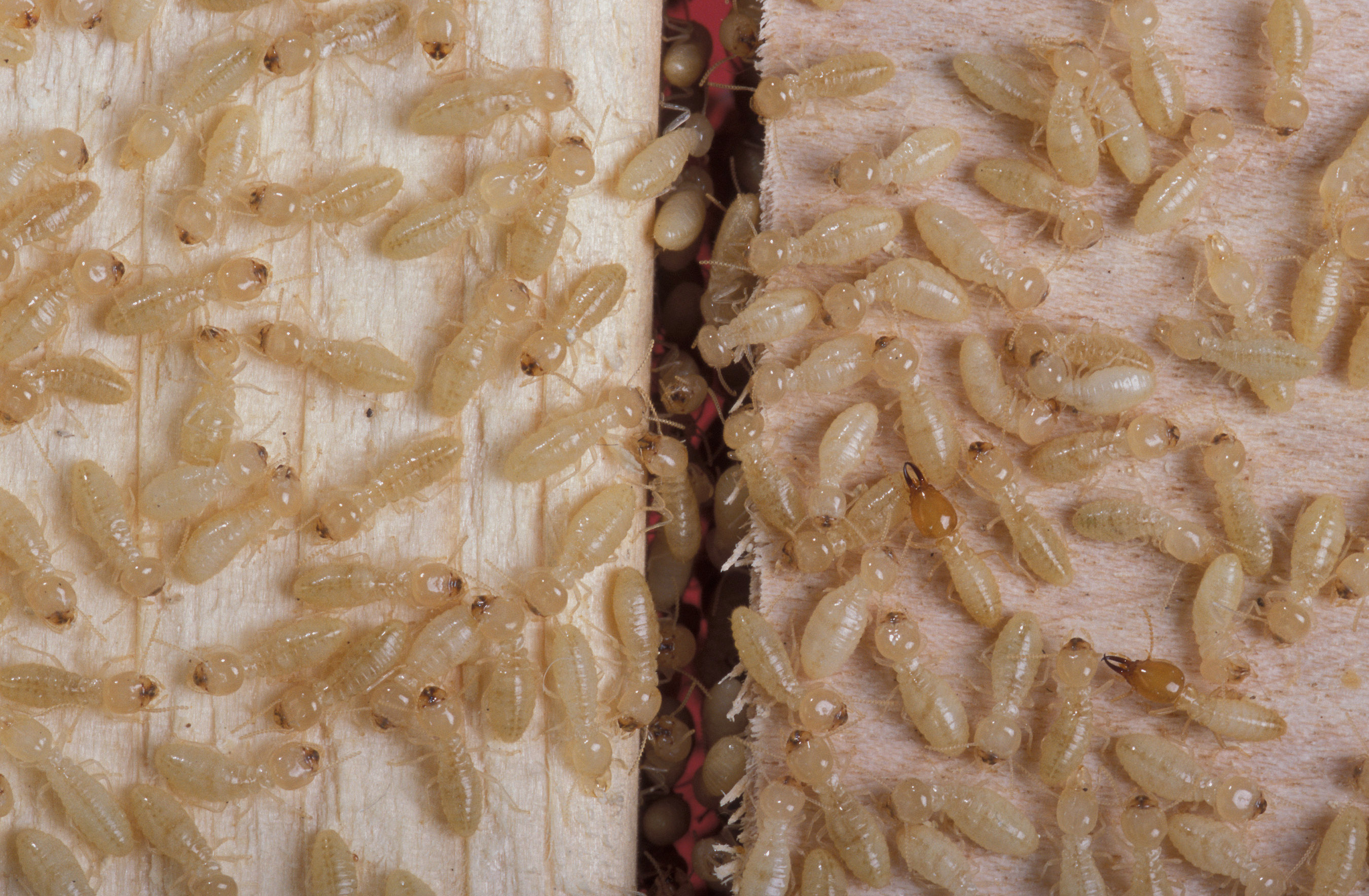
Pests, such as these termites, often occur in high densities, making the damage they do even more detrimental.

A pest is any living thing which humans consider troublesome to themselves, their possessions, or the environment. Pests can cause issues with crops, human or animal health, buildings, and wild areas or larger landscapes. An older usage of the word "pest" is of a deadly epidemic disease, specifically plague. In its broadest sense, a pest is a competitor to humanity. Pests include plants, pathogens, invertebrates, vertebrates, or any organism that harms an ecosystem.

=== Animals ===
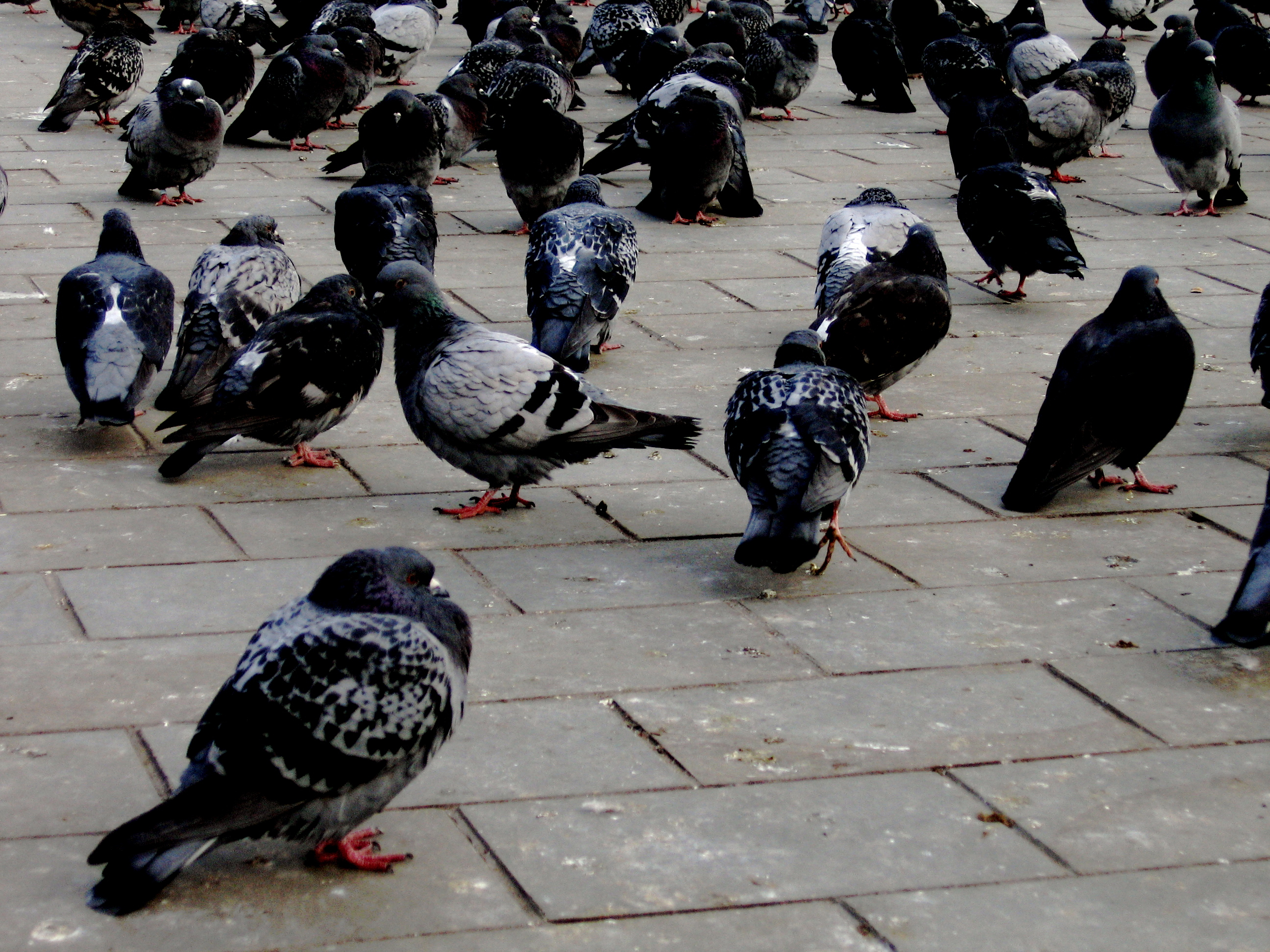
Feral pigeons, Columba livia domestica, can become very numerous in cities.

Animals are considered pests or vermin when they injure people or damage crops, forestry, or buildings. Elephants are regarded as pests by the farmers whose crops they raid and trample. Mosquitoes and ticks are vectors that can transmit ailments but are also pests because of the distress caused by their bites. Grasshoppers are usually solitary herbivores of little economic importance until the conditions are met for them to enter a swarming phase, become locusts and cause enormous damage. Many people appreciate birds in the countryside and their gardens, but when these accumulate in large masses, they can be a nuisance. Flocks of starlings can consist of hundreds of thousands of individual birds, their roosts can be noisy and their droppings voluminous; the droppings are acidic and can cause corrosion of metals, stonework, and brickwork as well as being unsightly. Pigeons in urban settings may be a health hazard, and gulls near the coast can become a nuisance, especially if they become bold enough to snatch food from passers-by. All birds are a risk at airfields where they can be sucked into aircraft engines. Woodpeckers sometimes excavate holes in buildings, fencing and utility poles, causing structural damage; they also drum on various reverberatory structures on buildings such as gutters, down-spouts, chimneys, vents and aluminium sheeting. Jellyfish can form vast swarms which may be responsible for damage to fishing gear, and sometimes clog the cooling systems of power and desalination plants which draw their water from the sea.

Many of the animals that we regard as pests live in our homes. Before humans built dwellings, these creatures lived in the wider environment, but co-evolved with humans, adapting to the warm, sheltered conditions that a house provides, the wooden timbers, the furnishings, the food supplies and the rubbish dumps. Many no longer exist as free-living organisms in the outside world, and can therefore be considered to be domesticated. The St Kilda house mouse rapidly became extinct when the last islander left the island of St Kilda, Scotland in 1930, but the St Kilda field mouse survived.

=== Plants ===
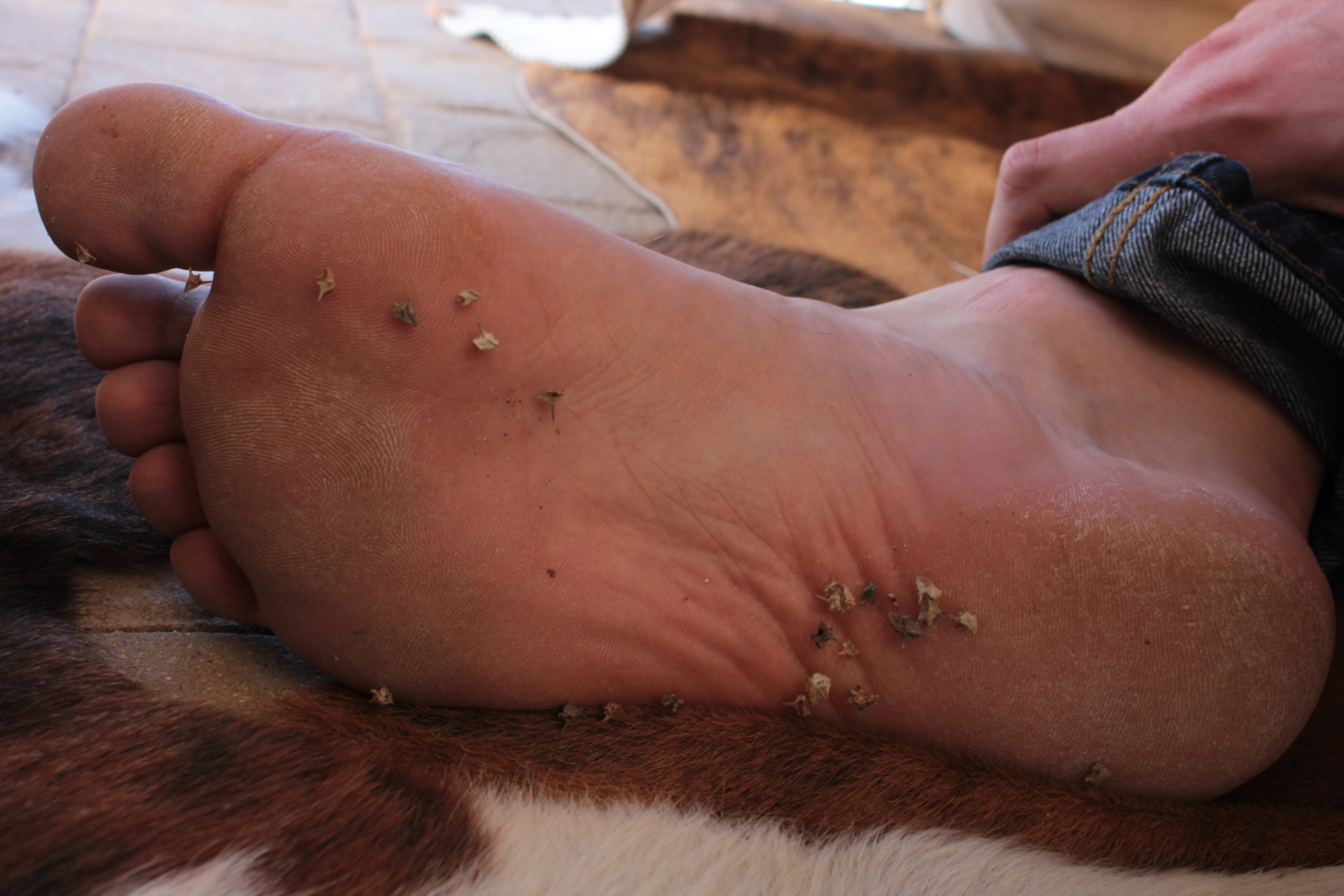
Caltrop, Tribulus terrestris, is sometimes considered a pest plant because of its sharp spiny burrs, shown here in a person's foot.

Plants may be considered pests, for example, if they are invasive species or weeds. There is no universal definition of what makes a plant a pest. Some governments, such as that of Western Australia, permit their authorities to prescribe as a pest plant "any plant that, in the local government authority's opinion, is likely to adversely affect the environment of the district, the value of property in the district, or the health, comfort or convenience of the district's inhabitants." An example of such a plant prescribed under this regulation is caltrop, Tribulus terrestris, which can cause poisoning in sheep and goats, but is mainly a nuisance around buildings, roadsides and recreation areas because of its uncomfortably sharp spiny burrs.

== Ecology ==
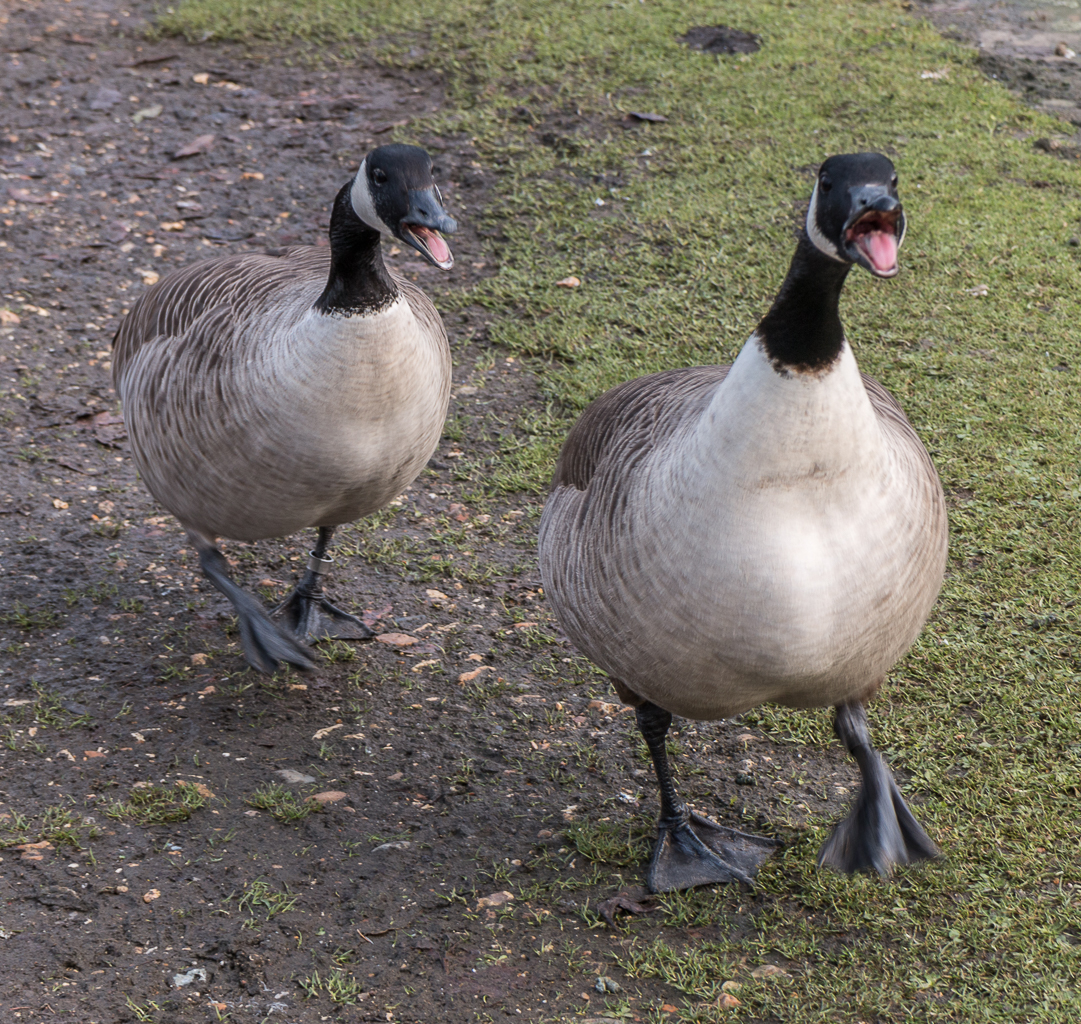
Due to their aggressive behaviour towards humans and other animals, their habit of begging for food, damaging grasslands and crops through grazing and their excrement, and the threat large flocks pose to aircraft, Canada geese, Branta canadensis, are sometimes considered to be pests.

The term "plant pest", mainly applied to insect micropredators of plants, has a specific definition in terms of the International Plant Protection Convention and phytosanitary measures worldwide. A pest is any species, strain or biotype of plant, animal, or pathogenic agent injurious to plants or plant products.

Worldwide, agricultural pest impacts are increased by higher degrees of interconnectedness. This is due to the increased risk that any particular pest problem anywhere in the world (as a system) will propagate across the entire system.

=== Plant defences against pests ===
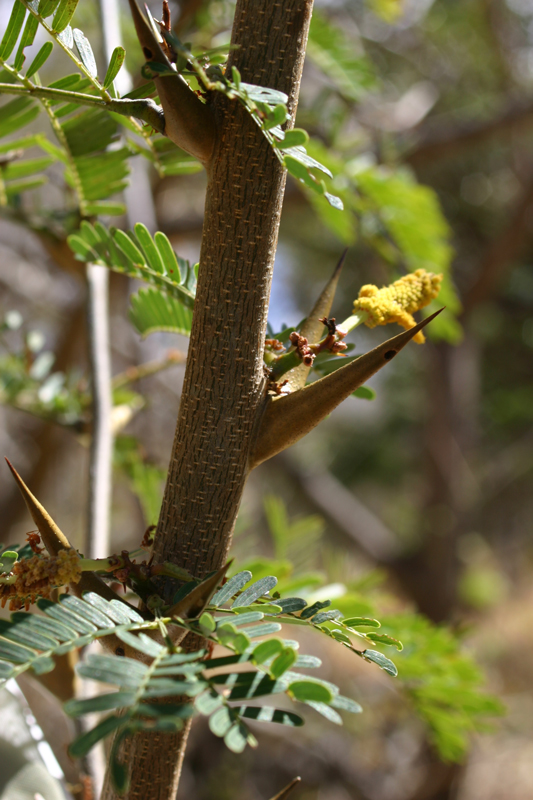
The large and directly defensive thorn-like stipules of Vachellia collinsii are hollow, offering shelter for ants, which further protect the plant against herbivores.

Plants have developed strategies that they use in their own defence, be they thorns (modified stems) or spines (modified leaves), stings, a thick cuticle or waxy deposits, with the second line of defence being toxic or distasteful secondary metabolites. Mechanical injury to the plant tissues allows the entry of pathogens and stimulates the plant to mobilise its chemical defences. The plant soon seals off the wound to reduce further damage.

Plants sometimes take active steps to reduce herbivory. Macaranga triloba for example has adapted its thin-walled stems to create ideal housing for an ant Crematogaster spp., which, in turn, protects the plant from herbivores. In addition to providing housing, the plant also provides the ant with its exclusive food source in the form of food bodies located on the leaf stipules. Similarly, several Acacia tree species have developed stout spines that are swollen at the base, forming a hollow structure that provides housing for ants which protect the plant. These Acacia trees also produce nectar in nectaries on their leaves as food for the ants.

=== Climate change ===
Pest ranges are heavily determined by climate. The most common example for the longest time has been rainfall: Although drought stress weakens crop disease resistance, drought also retards contagion and infection; and some variability in precipitation is universal. More recently climate change has been rapidly altering ranges, mostly by pushing them towards the poles (both North and South). From 1960–2013 ranges have shifted poleward by 2.7 ± 0.8 km (1.68 ± 0.50 mi) per year - albeit with significant differences between taxa. (Especially in the case of viruses and nematodes which show the opposite trend, toward the equator. This may be due to their lack of airborne dispersal, so their trend conforms with the trend of human-aided dispersal; or identification difficulties in the field.) In Europe, crop pests are expected to burgeon as the vertebrate predators which control them are expected to be suppressed by future climatic conditions.

== Economic impact ==
=== In agriculture and horticulture ===
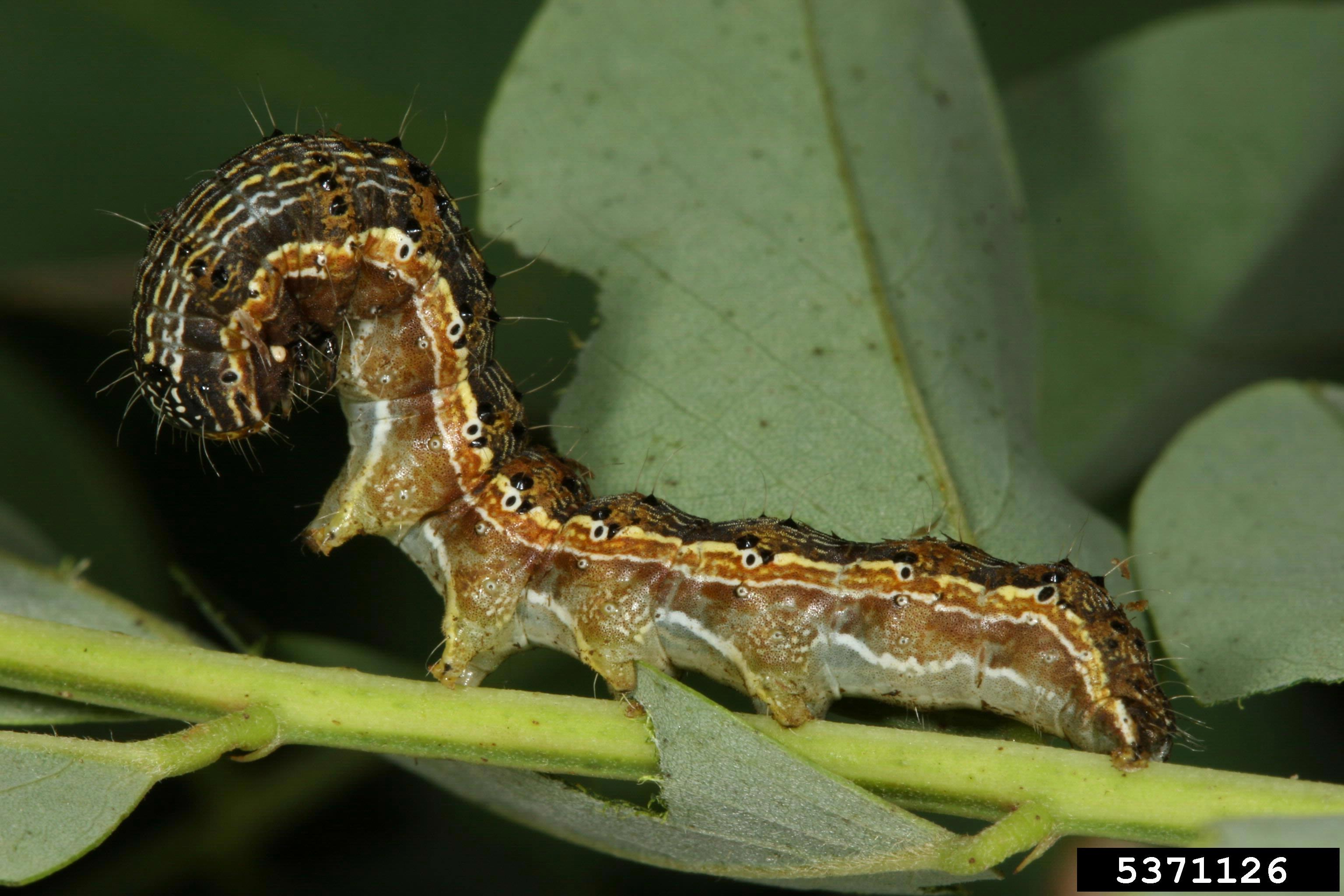
Caterpillars such as those of the cotton bollworm moth Helicoverpa armigera can devastate crops.

Together pests and diseases cause up to 40% yield losses every year. The animal groups of the greatest importance as agricultural pests are (in order of economic importance) insects, mites, nematodes and gastropod molluscs.

Insects are responsible for two major forms of damage to crops. First, there is the direct injury they cause to the plants as they feed on the tissues; a reduction in leaf surface available for photosynthesis, distortion of growing shoots, a diminution of the plant's growth and vigour, and the wilting of shoots and branches caused by the insects' tunneling activities. Secondly there is the indirect damage, where the insects do little direct harm, but either transmit or allow entry of fungal, bacterial or viral infections. Although some insects are polyphagous, many are restricted to one specific crop, or group of crops. In many cases it is the larva that feeds on the plant, building up a nutritional store that will be used by the short-lived adult; sawfly and lepidopteran larvae feed mainly on the aerial portions of plants while beetle larvae tend to live underground, feeding on roots, or tunnel into the stem or under the bark. The true bugs, Hemiptera, have piercing and sucking mouthparts and live by sucking sap from plants. These include aphids, whiteflies and scale insects. Apart from weakening the plant, they encourage the growth of sooty mould on the honeydew the insects produce, which cuts out the light and reduces photosynthesis, stunting the plant's growth. They often transmit serious viral diseases between plants.

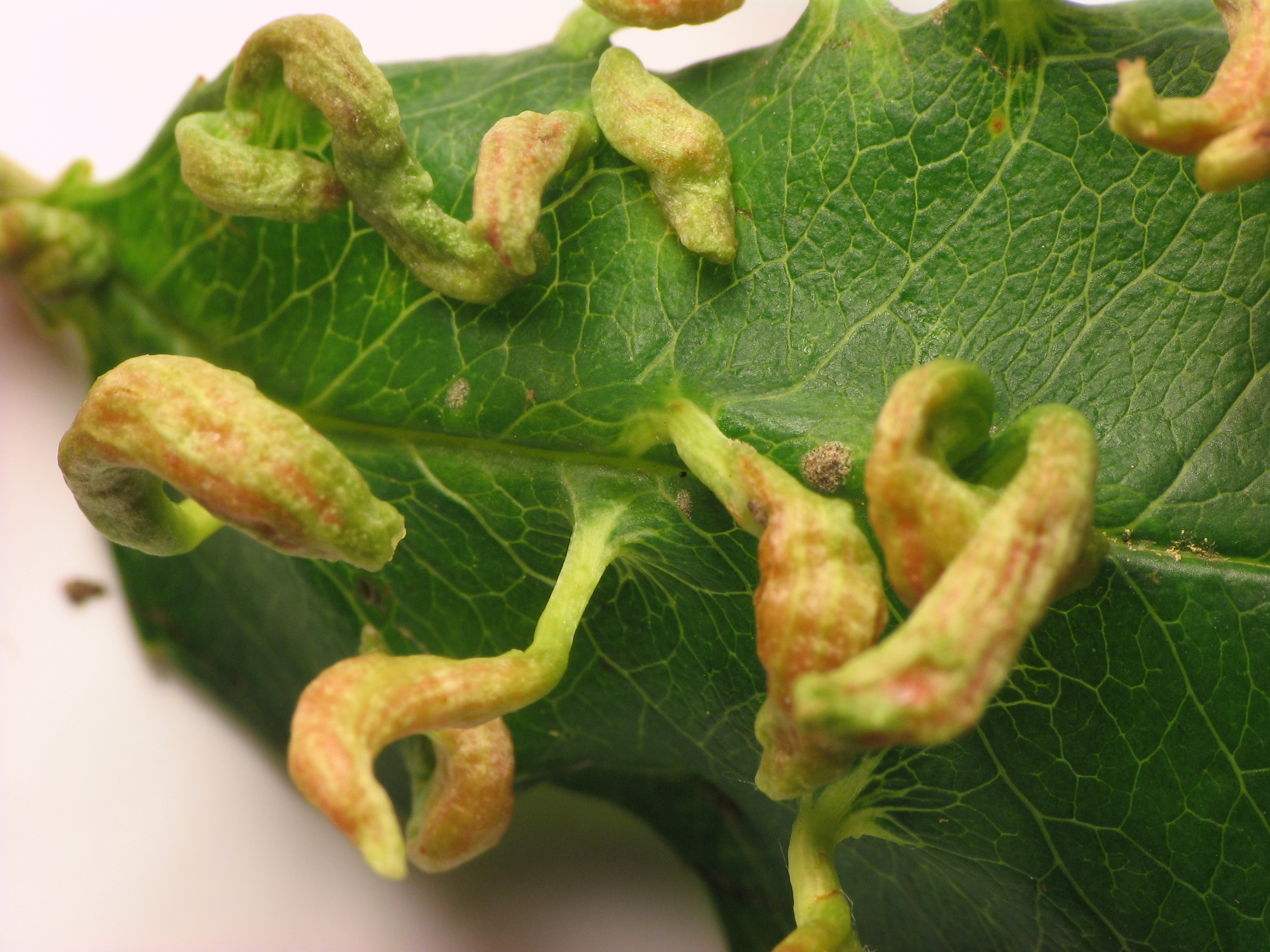
Galls on cherry caused by a mite, Eriophyes cerasicrumena

The mites that cause most trouble in the field are the spider mites. These are less than 1 mm (0.04 in) in diameter, can be very numerous, and thrive in hot, dry conditions. They mostly live on the underside of leaves and puncture the plant cells to feed, with some species forming webbing. They occur on nearly all important food crops and ornamental plants, both outdoors and under glass, and include some of the most economically important pests. Another important group of mites is the gall mites which affect a wide range of plants, several mite species being major pests causing substantial economic damage to crops. They can feed on the roots or the aerial parts of plants and transmit viruses. Some examples are the big bud mite that transmits the reversion virus of blackcurrants, the coconut mite which can devastate coconut production, and the cereal rust mite which transmits several grass and cereal viruses. Being exceedingly minute, many plant mites are spread by wind, although others use insects or other arthropods as a means to disperse.

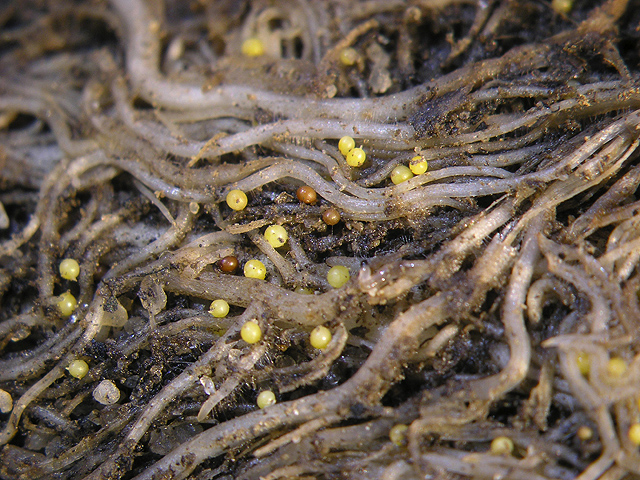
The potato cyst nematode can cause serious reductions in crop yield.

The nematodes (eelworms) that attack plants are minute, often too small to be seen with the naked eye, but their presence is often apparent in the galls or "knots" they form in plant tissues. Vast numbers of nematodes are found in soil and attack roots, but others affect stems, buds, leaves, flowers and fruits. High infestations cause stunting, deformation and retardation of plant growth, and the nematodes can transmit viral diseases from one plant to another. When its populations are high, the potato cyst nematode can cause reductions of 80% in yield of susceptible potato varieties. The nematode eggs survive in the soil for many years, being stimulated to hatch by chemical cues produced by roots of susceptible plants.

Slugs and snails are terrestrial gastropod molluscs which typically chew leaves, stems, flowers, fruit and vegetable debris. Slugs and snails differ little from each other and both do considerable damage to plants. With novel crops being grown and with insect pests having been brought more under control by biological and other means, the damage done by molluscs becomes of greater significance. Terrestrial molluscs need moist environments; snails may be more noticeable because their shells provide protection from desiccation, while most slugs live in soil and only come out to feed at night. They devour seedlings, damage developing shoots and feed on salad crops and cabbages, and some species tunnel into potatoes and other tubers. One example being the giant apple snail, Pomacea maculata which causes billions in loss in rice production each year.

=== Weeds ===
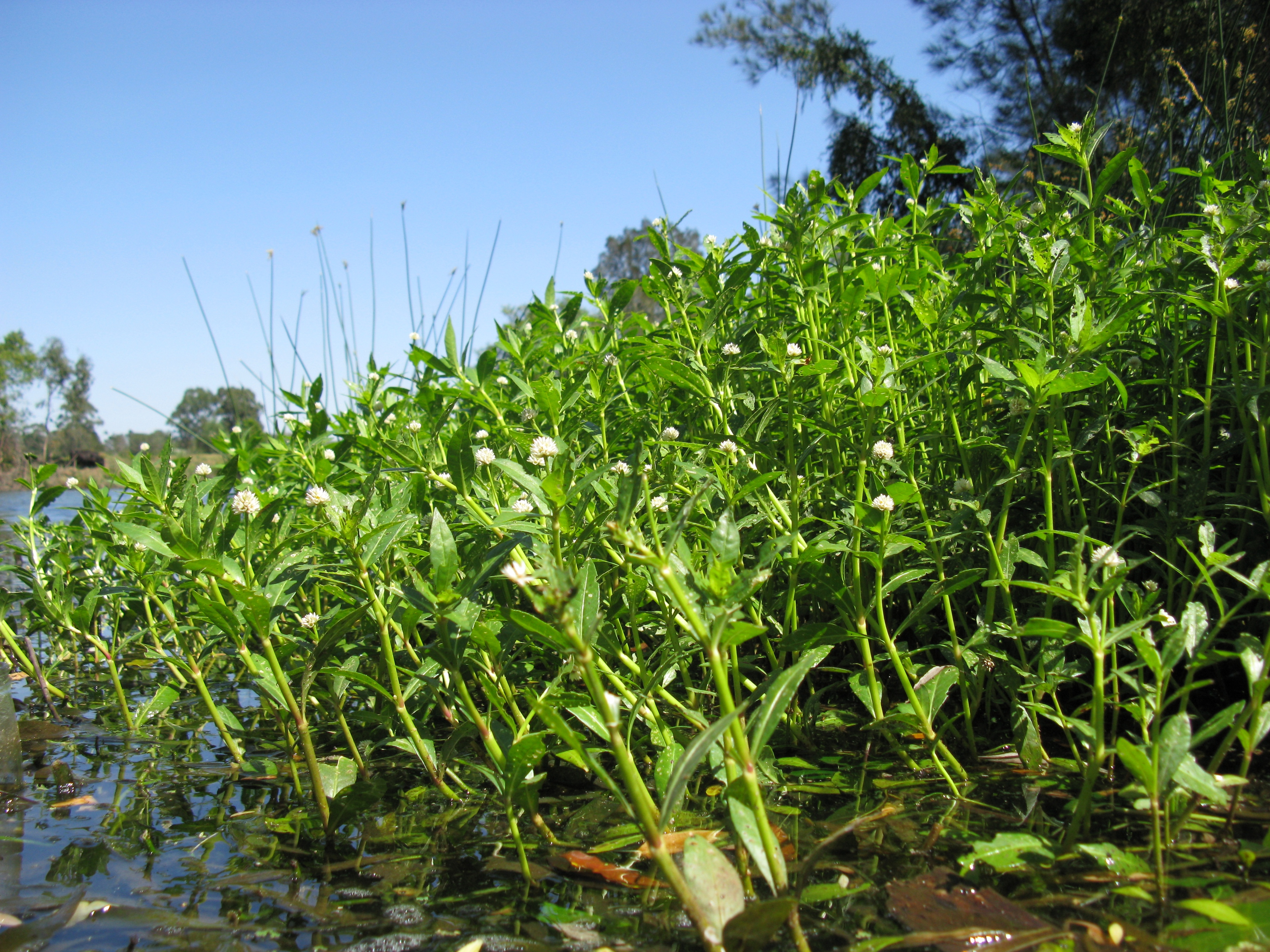
Alligator weed, a native of South America, is an invasive species in many other countries and is considered a noxious weed as it is harmful to aquatic ecosystems, recreational activities, and favours the spread of mosquitoes. Control is difficult.

A weed is a plant considered undesirable in a particular situation; the term has no botanical significance. Often, weeds are simply those native plants that are adapted to grow in disturbed ground, the disturbance caused by ploughing and cultivation favouring them over other species. Any plant is a weed if it appears in a location where it is unwanted; Bermuda grass makes a good lawn plant under hot dry conditions but become a bad weed when it out-competes cultivated plants.

A different group of weeds consists of those that are invasive, introduced, often unintentionally, to habitats to which they are not native but in which they thrive. Without their original competitors, herbivores, and diseases, they may increase and become a serious nuisance. One such plant is purple loosestrife, a native of Europe and Asia where it occurs in ditches, wet meadows and marshes; introduced into North America, it has no natural enemies to keep it in check and has taken over vast tracts of wetlands to the exclusion of native species.

=== In forestry ===
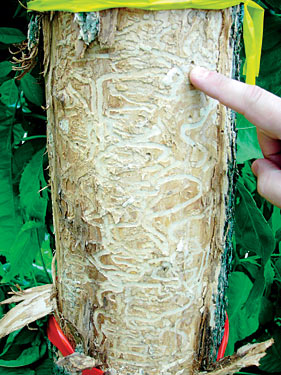
A green ash tree killed by emerald ash borer beetles

In forestry, pests may affect various parts of the tree, from its roots and trunk to the canopy far overhead. The accessibility of the part of the tree affected may make detection difficult, so that a pest problem may already be far advanced before it is first observed from the ground. The larch sawfly and spruce budworm are two insect pests prevalent in Alaska and aerial surveys can show which sections of forest are being defoliated in any given year so that appropriate remedial action can be taken.

Some pests may not be present on the tree all year round, either because of their life cycle or because they rotate between different host species at different times of the year. In forestry, pests may affect various parts of the tree, from its roots and trunk to the canopy far overhead. The larvae of wood-boring beetles, for example, are notorious for spending years excavating tunnels under the bark of trees, leading to significant structural damage. These larvae only emerge into the open for brief periods as adults, primarily to mate and disperse. The import and export of timber has inadvertently assisted some insect pests to establish themselves far from their country of origin. An insect may be of little importance in its native range, being kept under control by parasitoid wasps, predators, and the natural resistance of the host trees, but be a serious pest in a region into which it has been introduced. This is the case with the emerald ash borer, an insect native to north-eastern Asia, which, since its arrival in North America, has killed millions of ash trees.

=== In buildings ===
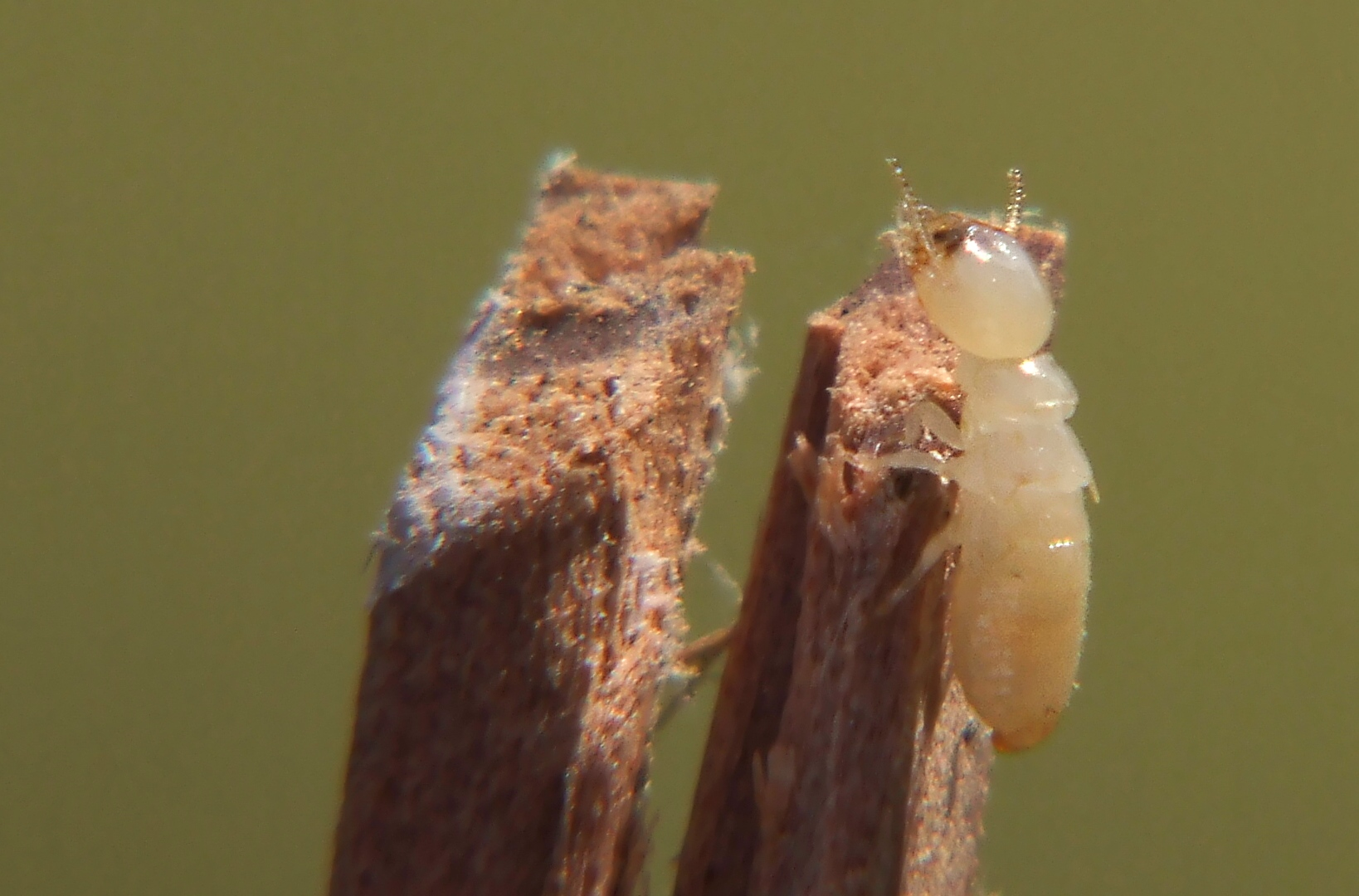
Termites can cause serious structural damage.

Animals able to live in the dry conditions found in buildings include many arthropods such as beetles, cockroaches, moths, mites, and silverfish. Another group, including termites, woodworm, longhorn beetles, and wood ants cause structural damage to buildings and furniture. The natural habitat of these is the decaying parts of trees. The deathwatch beetle infests the structural timbers of old buildings, mostly attacking hardwood, especially oak. The initial attack usually follows the entry of water into a building and the subsequent decay of damp timber. Furniture beetles mainly attack the sapwood of both hard and soft wood, only attacking the heartwood when it is modified by fungal decay. The presence of the beetles only becomes apparent when the larvae gnaw their way out, leaving small circular holes in the timber.

Carpet beetles and clothes moths cause non-structural damage to property such as clothing and carpets. It is the larvae that are destructive, feeding on wool, hair, fur, feathers and down. The moth larvae live where they feed, but the beetle larvae may hide behind skirting boards or in other similar locations between meals. They may be introduced to the home in any product containing animal fibres including upholstered furniture; the moths are feeble fliers but the carpet beetles may also enter houses through open windows. Furniture beetles, carpet beetles and clothes moths are also capable of creating great damage to museum exhibits, zoological and botanical collections, and other cultural heritage items. Constant vigilance is required to prevent an attack, and newly acquired items, and those that have been out on loan, may need quarantining before being added to the general collection.

There are over four thousand species of cockroach worldwide, but only four species are commonly regarded as pests, having adapted to live permanently in buildings. Considered to be a sign of unsanitary conditions, they feed on almost anything, reproduce rapidly and are difficult to eradicate. They can passively transport pathogenic microbes on their body surfaces, particularly in environments such as hospitals, and are linked with allergic reactions in humans.

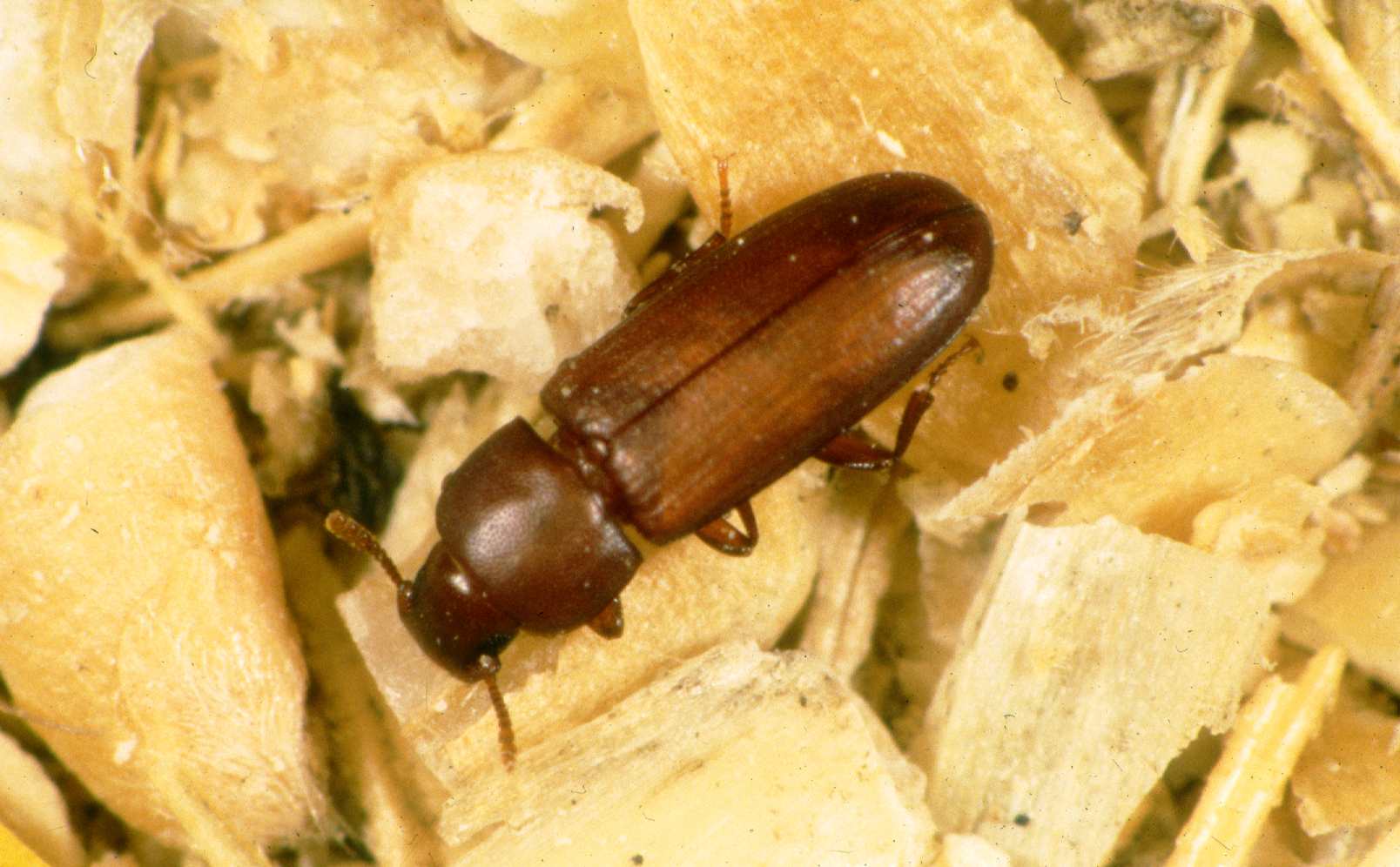
Flour beetles are important commercial pests of grain storage.

Various insects attack dry food products, with flour beetles, the drugstore beetle, the sawtoothed grain beetle and the Indianmeal moth being found worldwide. The insects may be present in the warehouse or maybe introduced during shipping, in retail outlets, or in the home; they may enter packets through tiny cracks or may chew holes in the packaging. The longer a product is stored, the more likely it is to become contaminated, with the insects often originating from dry pet foods.

Some mites, too, infest foodstuffs and other stored products. Each substance has its own specific mite, and they multiply with great rapidity. One of the most damaging is the flour mite, which is found in grain and may become exceedingly abundant in poorly stored material. In time, predatory mites usually move in and control the flour mites.

== Countermeasures ==
=== Pest control in agriculture and horticulture ===
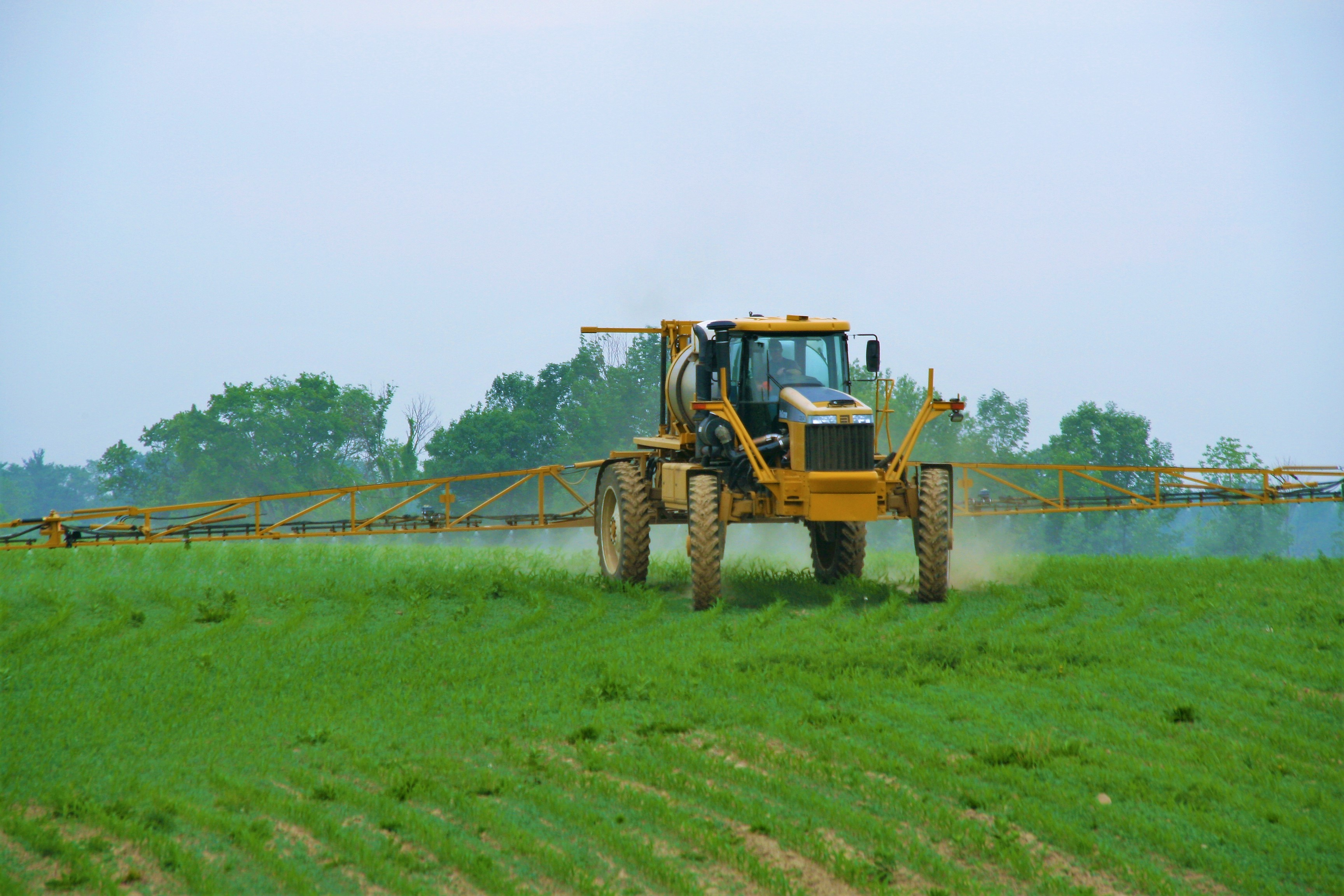
A row-crop sprayer applying pesticide to a young crop of maize

The control of pests in crops is as old as civilisation. The earliest approach was mechanical, from ploughing to picking off insects by hand. Early methods included the use of sulphur compounds, before 2500 BC in Sumeria. In ancient China, insecticides derived from plants were in use by 1200 BC to treat seeds and to fumigate plants. Chinese agronomy recognised biological control by natural enemies of pests and the varying of planting time to reduce pests before the first century AD. The agricultural revolution in Europe saw the introduction of effective plant-based insecticides such as pyrethrum, derris, quassia, and tobacco extract. The phylloxera (a powdery mildew) damage to the wine industry in the 19th century resulted in the development of resistant varieties and grafting, and the accidental discovery of effective chemical pesticides, Bordeaux mixture (lime and copper sulphate) and Paris Green (an arsenic compound), both very widely used. Biological control also became established as an effective measure in the second half of the 19th century, starting with the vedalia beetle against cottony cushion scale. All these methods have been refined and developed since their discovery.

=== Pest control in forestry ===
Forest pests inflict costly damage, but treating them is often unaffordable, given the relatively low value of forest products compared to agricultural crops. It is also generally impossible to eradicate forest pests, given the difficulty of examining entire trees, and the certainty that pesticides would damage many forest organisms other than the intended pests. Forest integrated pest management therefore aims to use a combination of prevention, cultural control measures, and direct control (such as pesticide use). Cultural measures include choosing appropriate species, keeping competing vegetation under control, ensuring a suitable stocking density, and minimizing injury and stress to trees.

=== Pest control in buildings ===
Pest control in buildings can be approached in several ways, depending on the type of pest and the area affected. Methods include improving sanitation and garbage control, modifying the habitat, and using repellents, growth regulators, traps, baits and pesticides. For example, the pesticide Boron can be impregnated into the fibres of cellulose insulation to kill self-grooming insects such as ants and cockroaches. Clothes moths can be controlled with airtight containers for storage, periodic laundering of garments, trapping, freezing, heating and the use of chemicals. Traditional mothballs deter adult moths with strong-smelling naphthalene; modern ones use volatile repellents such as 1,4-Dichlorobenzene. Moth larvae can be killed with insecticides such as permethrin or pyrethroids. However, insecticides cannot safely be used in food storage areas; alternative treatments include freezing foods for four days at 0 °F (−18 °C) or baking for half an hour at 130 °F (54 °C) to kill any insects present.

== In mythology, religion, folklore, and culture ==
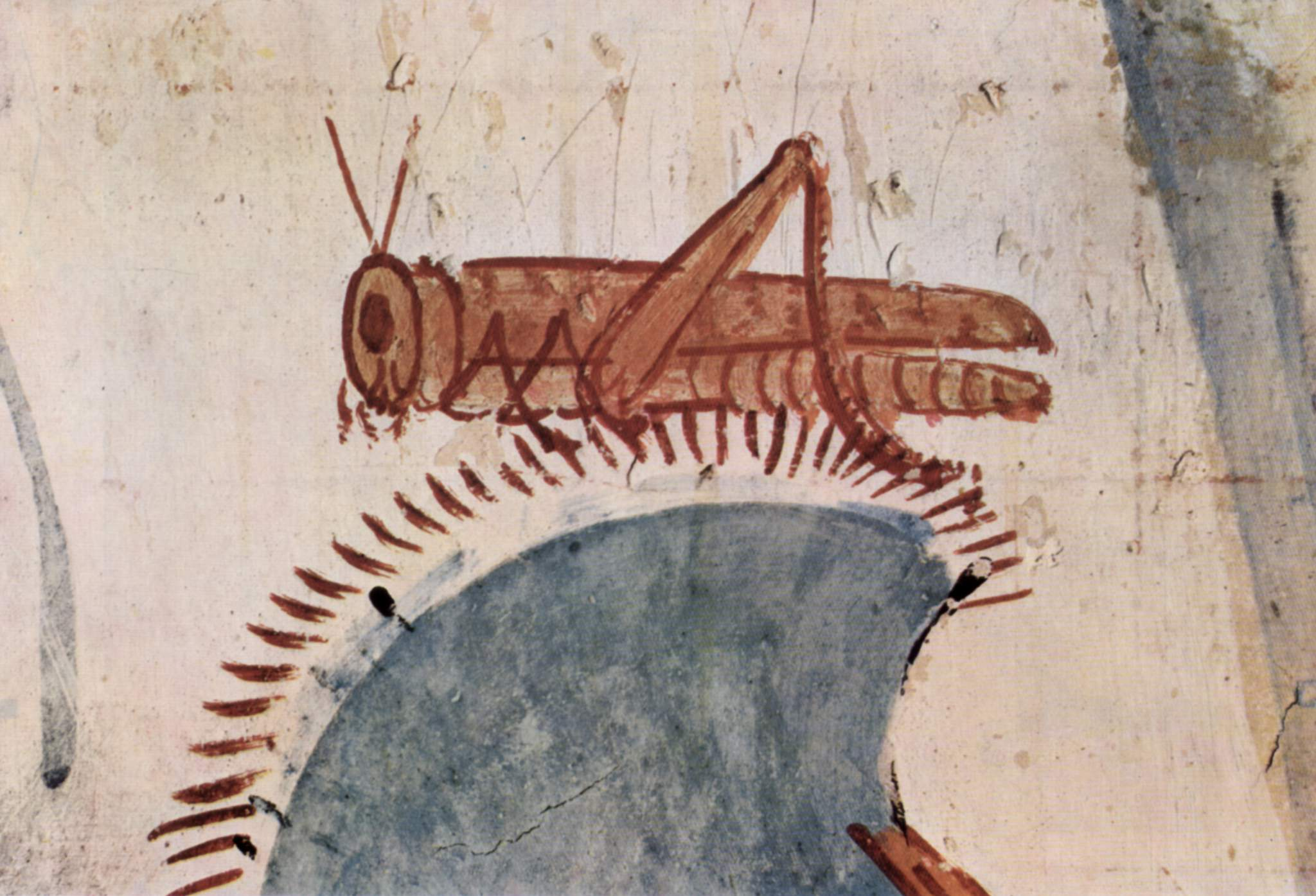
Locust detail from a hunt mural in the grave-chamber of Horemhab, Ancient Egypt, 1422–1411 BC

Pests have attracted human attention from the birth of civilisation. Plagues of locusts caused devastation in the ancient Middle East, and were recorded in tombs in Ancient Egypt from as early as 2470 BC, and in the Book of Exodus in the Bible, as taking place in Egypt around 1446 BC. Homer's Iliad mentions locusts taking to the wing to escape fire. Given the impact of agricultural pests on human lives, people have prayed for deliverance. For example, the 10th century Greek monk Tryphon of Constantinople is said to have prayed "Snails, earwigs and all other creatures, hurt not the vines, nor the land nor the fruit of the trees, nor the vegetables ... but depart into the wild mountains." The 11th-century Old English medical text Lacnunga contained charms and spells to ward off or treat pests such as wid smeogan wyrme, "penetrating worms", in this case requiring a charm to be sung, accompanied by covering the wound with spittle, pounded green centaury, and hot cow's urine. The 20th century "prayer against pests" including the words "By Your power may these injurious animals be driven off so that they will do no harm to any one and will leave our fields and meadows unharmed" was printed in the 1956 Rural Life Prayerbook.
