= Sorex araneus grantii =

Scientific classification
- Kingdom: Animalia
- Phylum: Chordata
- Class: Mammalia
- Order: Eulipotyphla
- Family: Soricidae
- Genus: Sorex
- Species: S. araneus
- Subspecies: S. a. grantii

Trinomial name
- Sorex araneus grantii Barrett-Hamilton & Hinton, 1913

Subspecies of mammal

Sorex araneus grantii is a subspecies of the shrew Sorex araneus, found only on the Scottish island of Islay. It was previously considered a separate species, Sorex grantii. It is distinguished from mainland shrews by its very grey flanks and different dentition.
