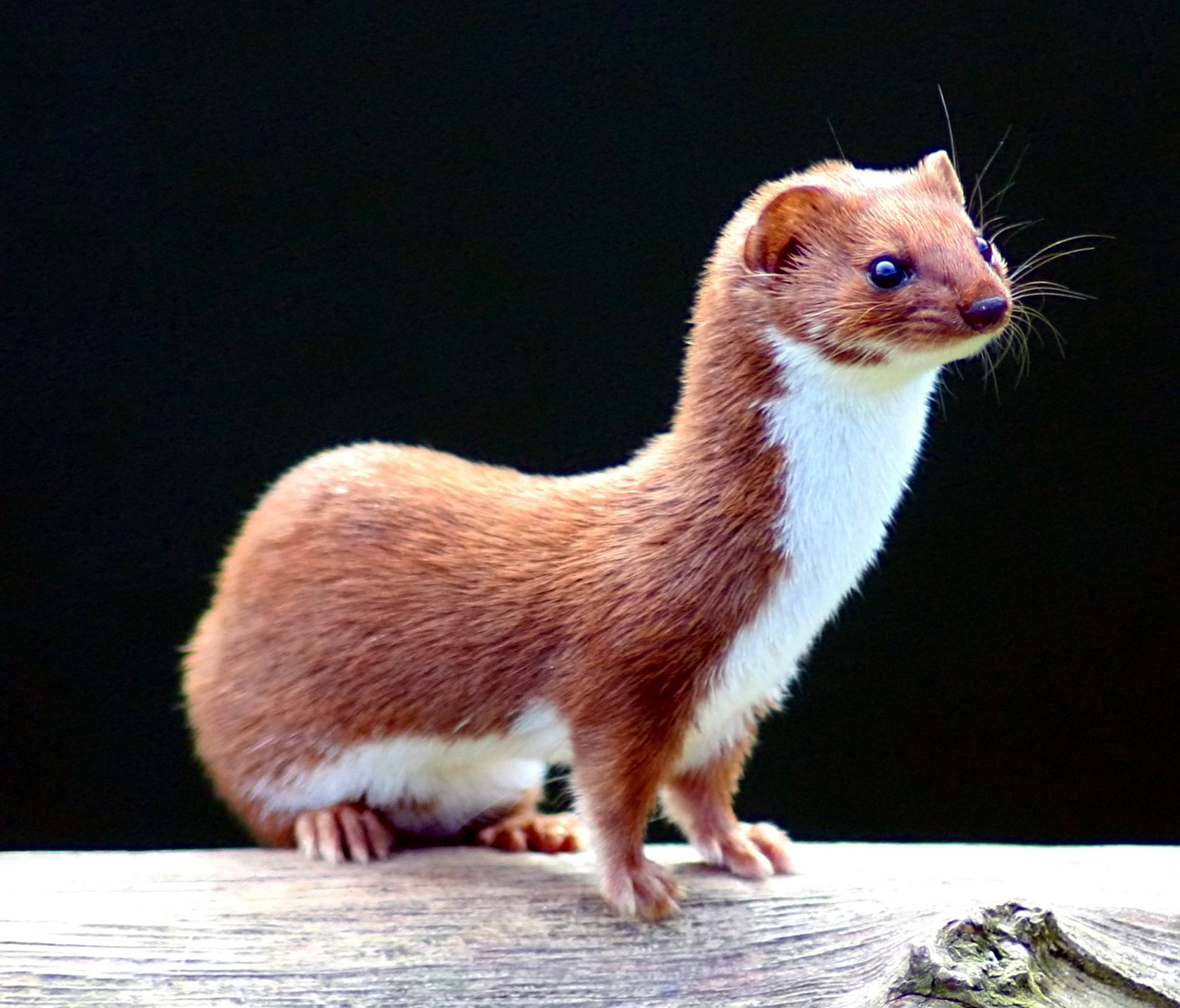
- Least weasel at the British Wildlife Centre, Surrey, England

Conservation status
- Least Concern (IUCN 3.1)

Scientific classification
- Kingdom: Animalia
- Phylum: Chordata
- Class: Mammalia
- Order: Carnivora
- Family: Mustelidae
- Genus: Mustela
- Species: M. nivalis

Binomial name
- Mustela nivalis Linnaeus, 1766
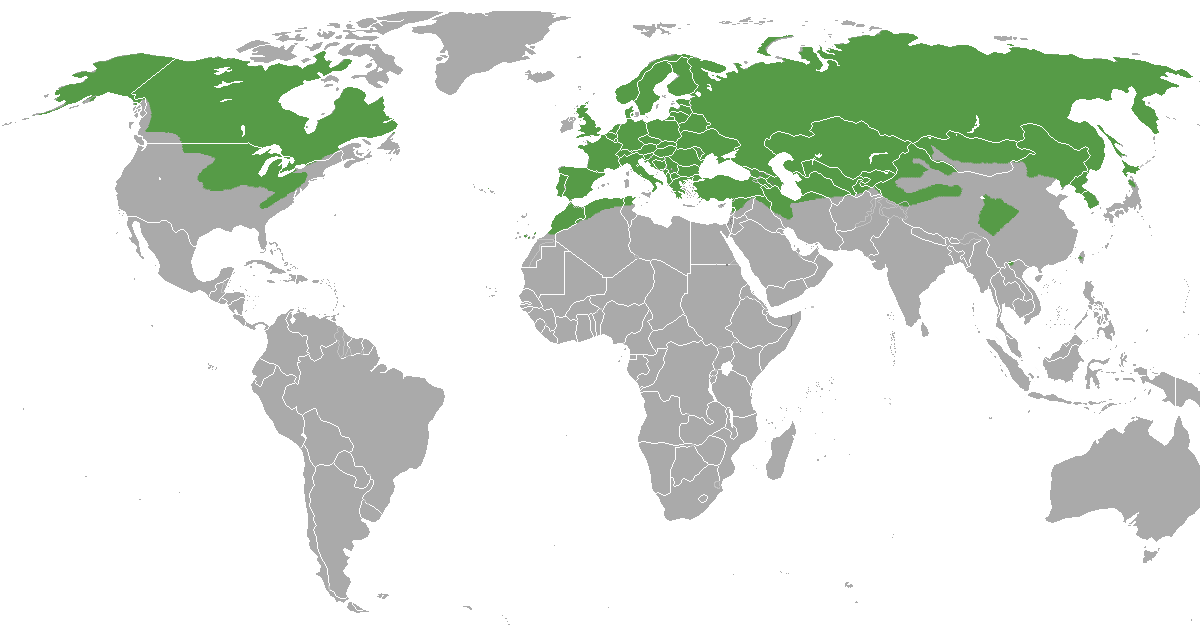
- Global range of the least weasel

= Least weasel =

Least weasel Temporal range: Late Pleistocene – Recent

Species of mammal

The least weasel (Mustela nivalis), little weasel, common weasel, or simply weasel is the smallest member of the genus Mustela, family Mustelidae and order Carnivora. It is native to Eurasia, North America and North Africa, and has been introduced to New Zealand, Malta, Crete, the Azores, and São Tomé. It is classified as least concern by the IUCN, due to its wide distribution and large population throughout the Northern Hemisphere. Eighteen subspecies are recognised.

The least weasel varies greatly in size over its range. The body is slender and elongated, and the legs and tail are relatively short. The colour varies geographically, as does the pelage type and length of tail. The dorsal surface, flanks, limbs and tail of the animal are usually some shade of brown while the underparts are white. The line delineating the boundary between the two colours is usually straight. At high altitudes and in the northern part of its range, the coat becomes pure white in winter.

Small rodents form the largest part of the least weasel's diet, but it also kills and eats rabbits, other mammals, and occasionally birds, birds' eggs, fish and frogs. Males mark their territories with olfactory signals and have exclusive home ranges which may intersect with or include several female ranges. Least weasels use pre-existing holes to sleep, store food and raise their young. Breeding takes place in the spring and summer, and there is a single litter of about six kits which are reared exclusively by the female. Due to its small size and fierce nature, the least weasel plays an important part in the mythology and legend of various cultures.

== Taxonomy and evolution ==
The least weasel was given its scientific name Mustela nivalis by Carl Linnaeus in his Twelfth edition of Systema Naturae in 1766; its epithet nivalis comes from the Latin word nix meaning "snow" because it grows a white coat during the winter season. The type locality was Västerbotten in Sweden. As an animal with a very wide distribution, the morphology of the least weasel varies geographically. The species was reviewed by Reichstein in 1957 and again by van Zyll de Jong in 1992 and Reig in 1997. Youngman (1982) placed it in the subgenus Mustela while Abramov (1999) considered it should be included in the subgenus Gale. Based on skull characteristics, Reig (1997) proposed that the taxon should be split into four species, M. subpalmata, M. rixosa, M. vulgaris and M. eskimo. Abrimov and Baryshinikov (2000) disagreed, recognising only M. subpalmata (the Egyptian weasel) as a separate species. However, Rodrigues et al. (2016) recognized M. subpalmata as a distinct population of nivalis rather than a distinct species.

Within the genus Mustela, the least weasel is a relatively unspecialised form, as evidenced by its pedomorphic skull, which occurs even in large subspecies. Its direct ancestor was Mustela praenivalis, which lived in Europe during the Middle Pleistocene and Villafranchian. M. praenivalis itself was probably preceded by M. pliocaenica of the Pliocene. The modern species probably arose during the Late Pleistocene. The least weasel is the product of a process begun 5–7 million years ago, when northern forests were replaced by open grassland, thus prompting an explosive evolution of small, burrowing rodents. The weasel's ancestors were larger than the current form, and underwent a reduction in size to exploit the new food source. The least weasel thrived during the Ice Age, as its small size and long body allowed it to easily operate beneath snow, as well as hunt in burrows. It probably crossed to North America through the Bering land bridge 200,000 years ago.

=== Subspecies ===
The least weasel has a high geographic variation, a fact which has historically led to numerous disagreements among biologists studying its systematics. The least weasel's subspecies are divided into three categories:

- The pygmaea–rixosa group (small least weasels): Tiny weasels with short tails, pedomorphic skulls, and pelts that turn pure white in winter. They inhabit northern European Russia, Siberia, the Russian Far East, Finland, the northern Scandinavian Peninsula, Mongolia, northeastern China, Japan and North America.
- The boccamela group (large least weasels): Very large weasels with large skulls, relatively long tails and lighter coloured pelts. Locally, they either do not turn white or only partially change colour in winter. They inhabit Transcaucasia, from western Kazakhstan to Semirechye and in the flat deserts of Middle Asia. They are also found in Morocco, Algeria, and Tunisia.
- The nivalis group (medium-sized least weasels): Medium-sized weasels, with tails of moderate length, representing a transitional form between the former two groups. They inhabit the middle and southern regions of European Russia, Crimea, the Ciscaucasus, western Kazakhstan, the southern and middle Urals and the montane parts of Middle Asia, except the Kopet Dag.

Subspecies	Trinomial authority	Description	Range	Synonyms
Common least weasel M. n. nivalis (Nominate subspecies)	Linnaeus, 1766	A medium-sized subspecies with a tail of moderate length, constituting about 20–21% of its body length. In its summer fur, the upper body is a dark brownish or chestnut colour, while its winter fur is pure white. It is probably a transitional form between the small pygmaea and the large vulgaris.	The middle regions of European Russia, from the Baltic states to the middle and southern Urals, northward approximately to the latitude of Saint Petersburg and Perm, and south to the Kursk and Voronezh Oblasts. Outside the former Soviet Union, its range includes Northern Europe (except for Ireland, Iceland, Finland and parts of the Scandinavian Peninsula) and Hokkaidō.	caraftensis (Kishida, 1936) kerulenica (Bannikov, 1952) punctata (Domaniewski, 1926) yesoidsuna (Kishida, 1936)
Allegheny least weasel M. n. allegheniensis	Rhoads, 1901	Similar to M. n. rixosa, but is larger, has a broad skull and darker coat, and is more adapted to live in deciduous forests	The northeastern United States (Michigan, Pennsylvania, New York, Virginia, North Carolina, Ohio, Illinois, Wisconsin, West Virginia, and Indiana)	
Transcaucasian least weasel M. n. boccamela	Bechstein, 1800	A very large subspecies, with a long tail constituting about 30% of its body length. In its summer fur, the upper body is light brownish or chestnut with yellowish or reddish tints, with some individuals having a brownish dot on the corners of the mouth and sometimes on the chest and belly. The winter fur is not pure white, being usually dirty white with brown patches.	Transcaucasia, southern Europe, Asia Minor and probably western Iran	italicus (Barrett-Hamilton, 1900)
Plains least weasel M. n. campestris	Jackson, 1913		The Great Plains of the United States (South Dakota, Iowa, Nebraska, and Kansas)	
Caucasian least weasel M. n. caucasica	Barrett-Hamilton, 1900			dinniki (Satunin, 1907)
Alaskan least weasel M. n. eskimo	Stone, 1900	A small subspecies. Resembles M. n. rixosa, but has a duller colour, a larger skull and a shorter tail.	Alaska, the Yukon, and the Northwest Territories	
Turkmenian least weasel M. n. heptneri	Morozova-Turova, 1953	A very large subspecies with a long tail constituting about 25–30% of its body length. In its summer fur, the upper body is very light sandy brown or pale-yellowish. The fur is short, sparse and coarse, and does not turn white in winter.	The deserts and semi-deserts of southern Kazakhstan and Middle Asia from the Caspian Sea to Semirechye, southern Tajikistan, Koppet Dag, Afghanistan and northeastern Iran	
Japanese least weasel M. n. namiyei	Kuroda, 1921	Smaller than M. n. rixosa and paler than M. n. eskimo. Resembles M. n. pygmaea, but the head and body are longer and the tail considerably longer.	Northern Honshū (Aomori, Akita and Iwate Prefectures)	
Mediterranean least weasel M. n. numidica	Pucheran, 1855	The largest subspecies	Morocco, Algeria, Egypt (formerly thought to be a distinct species, the Egyptian weasel), Malta, the Azores Islands and Corsica	albipes (Mina Palumbo, 1868) algiricus (Thomas, 1895) atlas (Barrett-Hamilton, 1904) corsicanus (Cavazza, 1908) fulva (Mina Palumbo, 1908) galanthias (Bate, 1905) ibericus (Barrett-Hamilton, 1900) meridionalis (Costa, 1869) siculus (Barrett-Hamilton, 1900) subpalmata Hemprich & Ehrenberg, 1833
Montane Turkestan least weasel M. n. pallida	Barrett-Hamilton, 1900	A medium-sized subspecies with a tail constituting about 24% of its body length. The colour of the summer fur is light-brownish, while the winter fur is white.	The montane parts of Turkmenistan, Uzbekistan, Tajikistan, Kazakhstan and Kirgizia, as well as the Chinese parts of the same mountain systems and perhaps in the extreme eastern parts of Hindukush	
Siberian least weasel M. n. pygmaea	J. A. Allen, 1903	A very small subspecies, with a short tail which constitutes about 13% of its body length. In its summer coat, the dorsal colour is dark brown or reddish, while the winter fur is entirely white.	All of Siberia (except for southern and southeastern Transbaikalia); the northern and middle Urals, northern Kazakhstan and the Russian Far East, including Sakhalin, the Kuril Islands and the Korean Peninsula; all of Mongolia (except for the eastern part), and probably northeastern China	kamtschatica (Dybowksi, 1922)
Bangs' least weasel M. n. rixosa	Bangs, 1896	The smallest subspecies and the smallest living mammalian carnivore in the world. In its summer coat, the fur is dark reddish-brown, while the winter fur is pure white.	Nunavut, Labrador, Quebec, Minnesota, North Dakota, Montana, Saskatchewan, Alberta, and British Columbia	
Middle European least weasel M. n. vulgaris	Erxleben, 1777	A somewhat larger subspecies than nivalis with a longer tail, which constitutes about 27% of its body length. In its summer fur, the upper body varies from being light brownish to dark chestnut, while the winter fur is white in its northern range and piebald in its southern range.	Southern European Russia from the latitude of southern Voronezh and Kursk districts, Crimea, Ciscaucasia, and the northern slopes of the main Caucasus, eastward to the Volga. Outside the former Soviet Union, its range includes Europe southward to the Alps and the Pyrenees. Introduced to New Zealand.	dumbrowskii (Matschie, 1901) hungarica (Vásárhelyi, 1942) minutus (Pomel, 1853) monticola (Cavazza, 1908) nikolskii (Semenov, 1899) occidentalis (Kratochvil, 1977) trettaui (Kleinschmidt, 1937) vasarhelyi (Kretzoi, 1942)

== Description ==
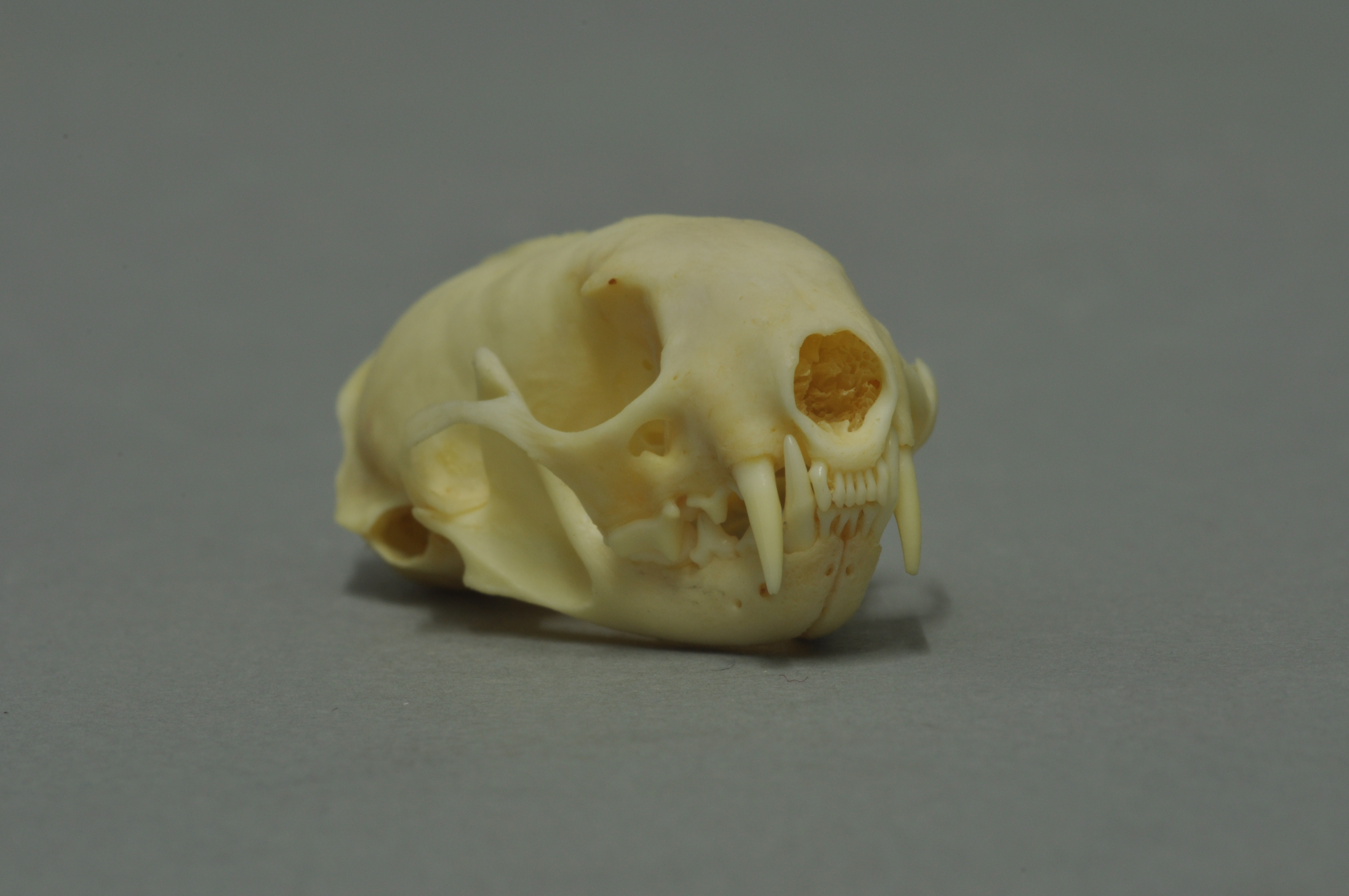
Skull of a least weasel

Least weasel at the British Wildlife Centre

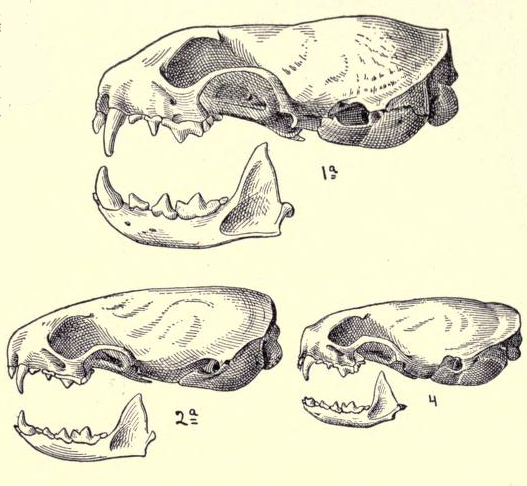
Skulls of a long-tailed weasel (top), a stoat (bottom left) and least weasel (bottom right), as illustrated in Merriam's Synopsis of the Weasels of North America

The least weasel has a thin, greatly elongated and extremely flexible body with a small, yet elongated, blunt-muzzled head which is no thicker than the neck. The eyes are small in relation to their head size and are bulging and dark colored. The legs and tail are relatively short, the latter constituting less than half the body length. The feet have sharp, dark-coloured claws, and the soles are heavily haired. The skull, especially that of the small rixosa group, has an infantile appearance when compared with that of other members of the genus Mustela (in particular, the stoat and kolonok). This is expressed in the relatively large size of the cranium and shortened facial region. The skull is, overall, similar to that of the stoat, but smaller, though the skulls of large male weasels tend to overlap in size with those of small female stoats. There are usually four pairs of nipples but these are only visible in females.

The baculum is short, 16 to 20 mm (0.63 to 0.79 in), with a thick, straight shaft. Fat is deposited along the spine, kidneys, gut mesentries and around the limbs. The least weasel has muscular anal glands under the tail, which measure 7 by 5 mm (0.28 by 0.20 in), and contain sulphurous volatiles, including thietanes and dithiacyclopentanes. The smell and chemical composition of these chemicals are distinct from those of the stoat. The least weasel moves by jumping, the distance between the tracks of the fore and hind limbs being 18 to 35 cm (7.1 to 13.8 in).

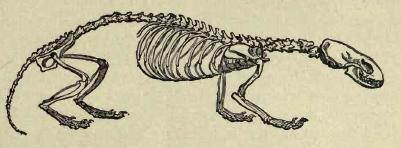
Skeleton, as illustrated in Lydekker's The New Natural History

Dimensions vary geographically, to an extent rarely found among other mammals. Least weasels of the boccamela group, for example, may outweigh the smaller races by almost four times. In some large subspecies, the male may be 1.5 times longer than the female. The tail lengths are also variable, constituting 13 to 30 percent of the length of the body. Average body length in males is 130 to 260 mm (5.1 to 10.2 in), while females average 114 to 204 mm (4.5 to 8.0 in). The tail measures 12 to 87 mm (0.47 to 3.43 in) in males and 17 to 60 mm (0.67 to 2.36 in) in females. Males weigh 36 to 250 g (1.3 to 8.8 oz), while females weigh 29 to 117 g (1.0 to 4.1 oz).

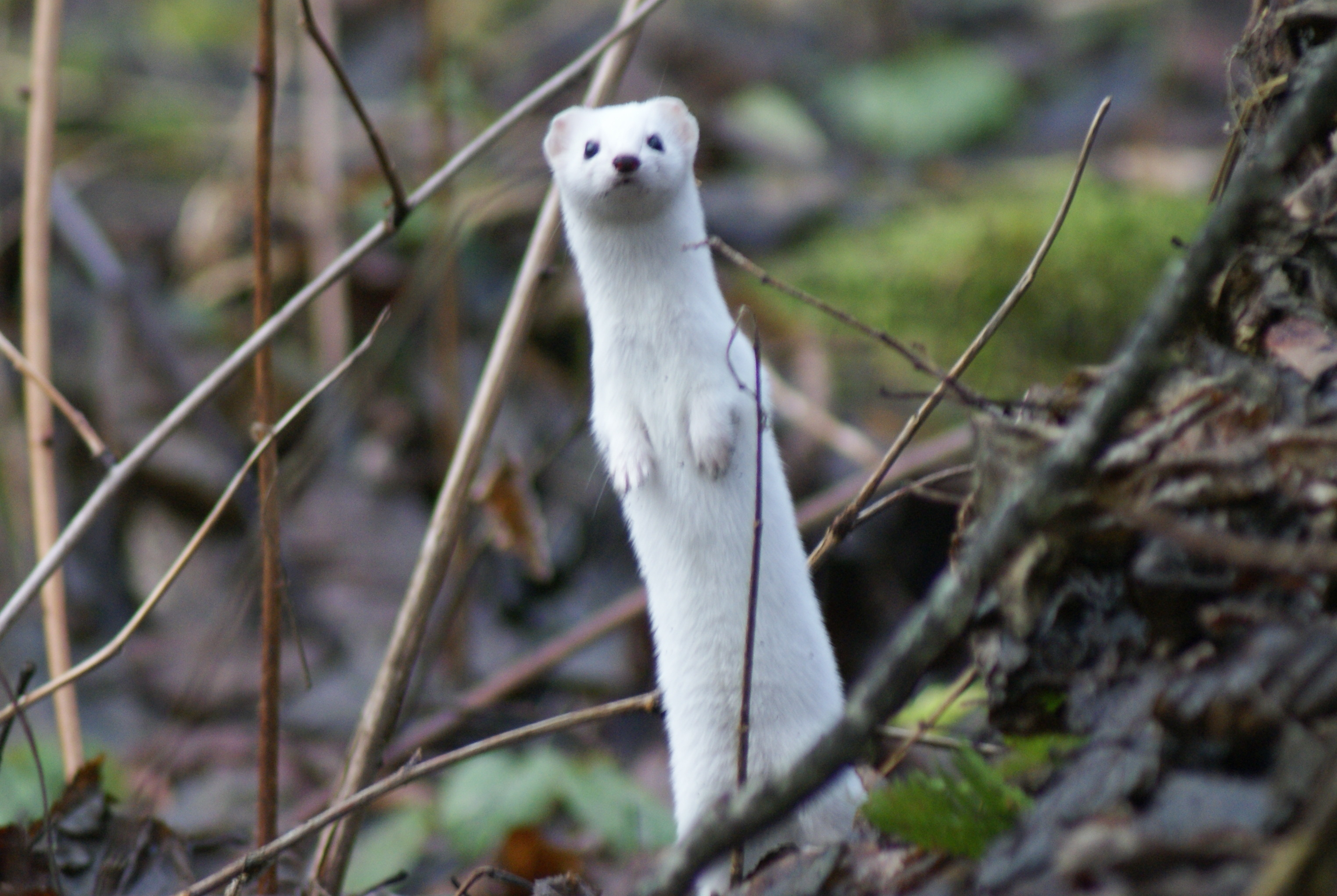
The winter coat is conspicuous when there is no snow on the ground.

The winter fur is dense, but short and closely fitting. In northern subspecies, the fur is soft and silky, but coarse in southern forms. The summer fur is very short, sparser and rougher. The upper parts in the summer fur are dark, but vary geographically from dark-tawny or dark-chocolate to light pale tawny or sandy. The lower parts, including the lower jaw and inner sides of the legs, are white. There is often a brown spot at the corner of the mouth. The dividing line between the dark upper and light lower parts is usually straight but sometimes forms an irregular line. The tail is brown, and sometimes the tip is a little darker but it is never black. In the northern part of its range and at high altitudes, the least weasel changes colour in the winter, the coat becoming pure white and exhibiting a few black hairs in rare circumstances.

== Distribution and habitat ==
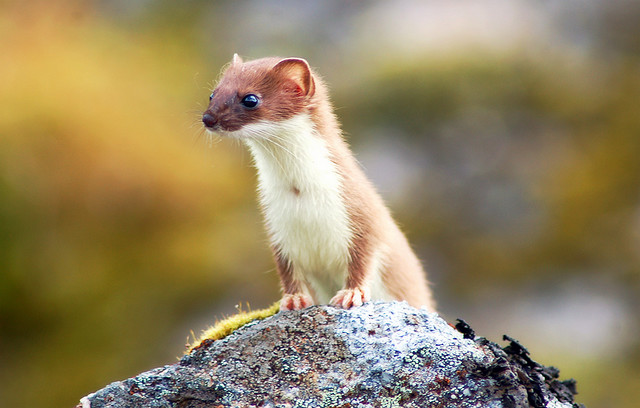
Alaskan least weasel (M. n. eskimo)

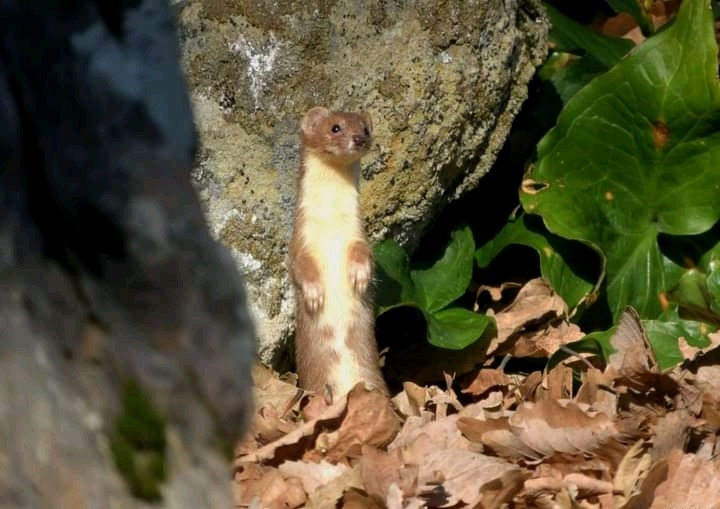
Least weasel in northern Algeria

The least weasel has a circumboreal, Holarctic distribution, encompassing much of Europe and North Africa, Asia and parts of northern North America. It has been introduced to New Zealand, Malta, Crete, the Azores Islands and also São Tomé off West Africa. It occurs throughout Europe, except Ireland, and on all major Mediterranean islands. It also occurs on Honshu and Hokkaido Islands in Japan and on Kunashir, Iturup, and Sakhalin Islands in Russia.

The least weasel inhabits fields, open woodland, bushy and rocky areas, parks and gardens at elevations of up to about 3,000 m (9,800 ft).

Fossilised remains of the least weasel are known from Denisova Cave.

== Behaviour and ecology ==
=== Reproduction and development ===
The least weasel mates in April–July and there is a 34- to 37-day gestation period. In the Northern Hemisphere, the average litter size consists of 6 kits and these reach sexual maturity in 3 to 4 months. Males may mate during their first year of life, though this is usually unsuccessful. They are fecund in February–October, though the early stages of spermatogenesis do occur throughout the winter months. Anestrus in females lasts from September until February.

The female raises her kits without help from the male. They are 1.5 to 4.5 g (0.053 to 0.159 oz) in weight at birth. Newborn kits are born pink, naked, blind and deaf, but gain a white coat of downy fur at the age of 4 days. At 10 days, the margin between the dark upper parts and light under parts becomes visible. The milk teeth erupt at 2 to 3 weeks of age, at which point the young start to eat solid food, though lactation can last 12 weeks. The eyes and ears open at 3 to 4 weeks of age, and by 8 weeks, killing behaviour is developed. The family breaks up after 9 to 12 weeks. There is a single litter each year and least weasels can live for 7 or 8 years.

=== Territorial and social behaviours ===
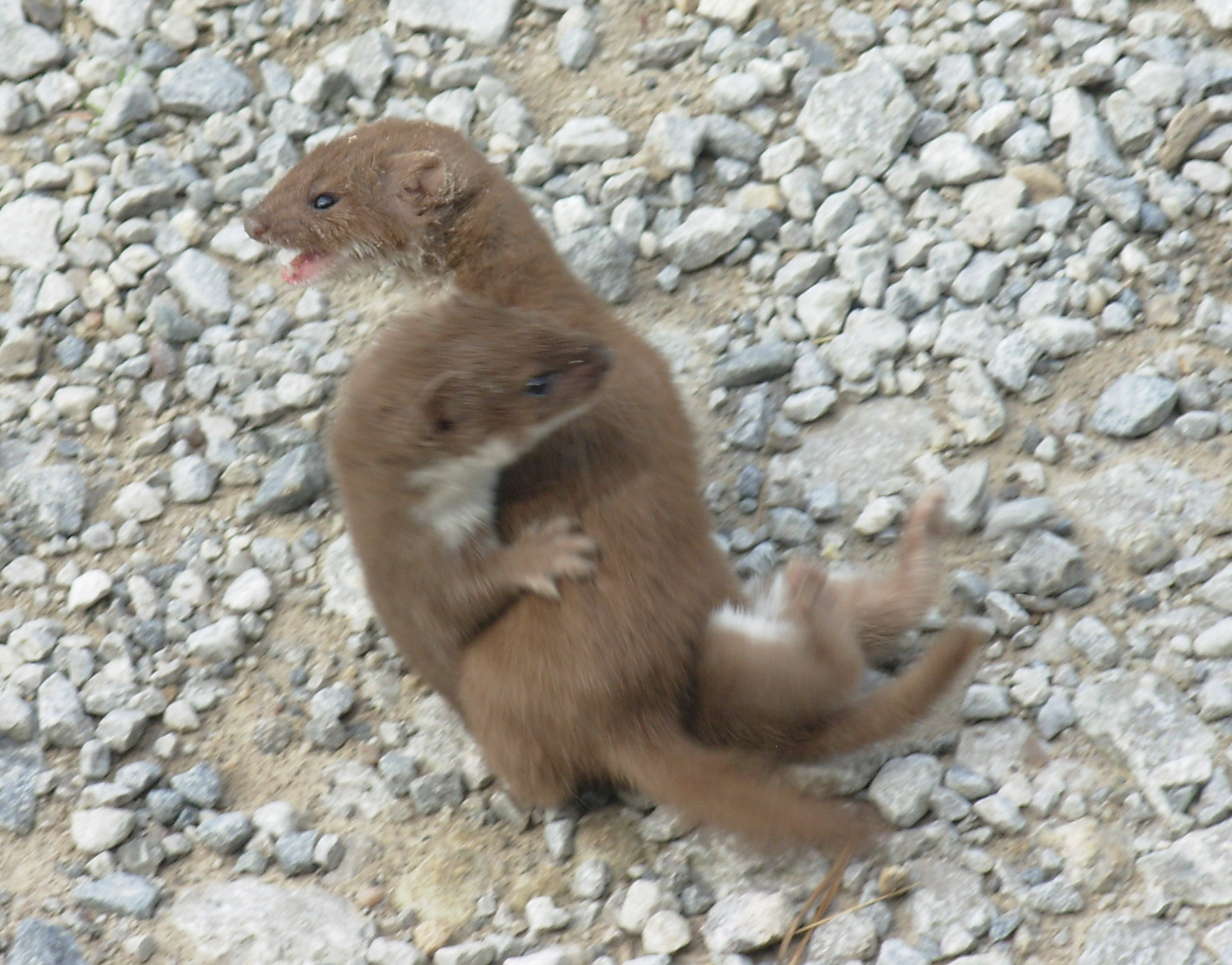
Two least weasels fighting

The least weasel has a typical mustelid territorial pattern, consisting of exclusive male ranges encompassing multiple female ranges. The population density of each territory depends greatly on food supply and reproductive success, thus the social structure and population density of any given territory is unstable and flexible. Like the stoat, the male least weasel extends his range during spring or during food shortages. Its scent marking behaviour is similar to that of the stoat; it uses faeces, urine and anal and dermal gland secretions, the latter two of which are deposited by anal dragging and body rubbing. The least weasel does not dig its own den, but nests in the abandoned burrow of another species such as a mole or rat. The burrow entrance measures about 2.5 cm (0.98 in) across and leads to the nest chamber located up to 15 cm (5.9 in) below ground. The nest chamber (which is used for sleeping, rearing kits and storing food) measures 10 cm (3.9 in) in diameter, and is lined with straw and the skins of the weasel's prey.

The least weasel has four basic vocalisations; a guttural hiss emitted when alarmed, which is interspersed with short screaming barks and shrieks when provoked. When defensive, it emits a shrill wail or squeal. During encounters between males and females or between a mother and kits, the least weasel emits a high-pitched trilling. The least weasel's way of expressing aggression is similar to that of the stoat. Dominant weasels exhibit lunges and shrieks during aggressive encounters, while subdominant weasels will emit submissive squeals.

=== Diet ===
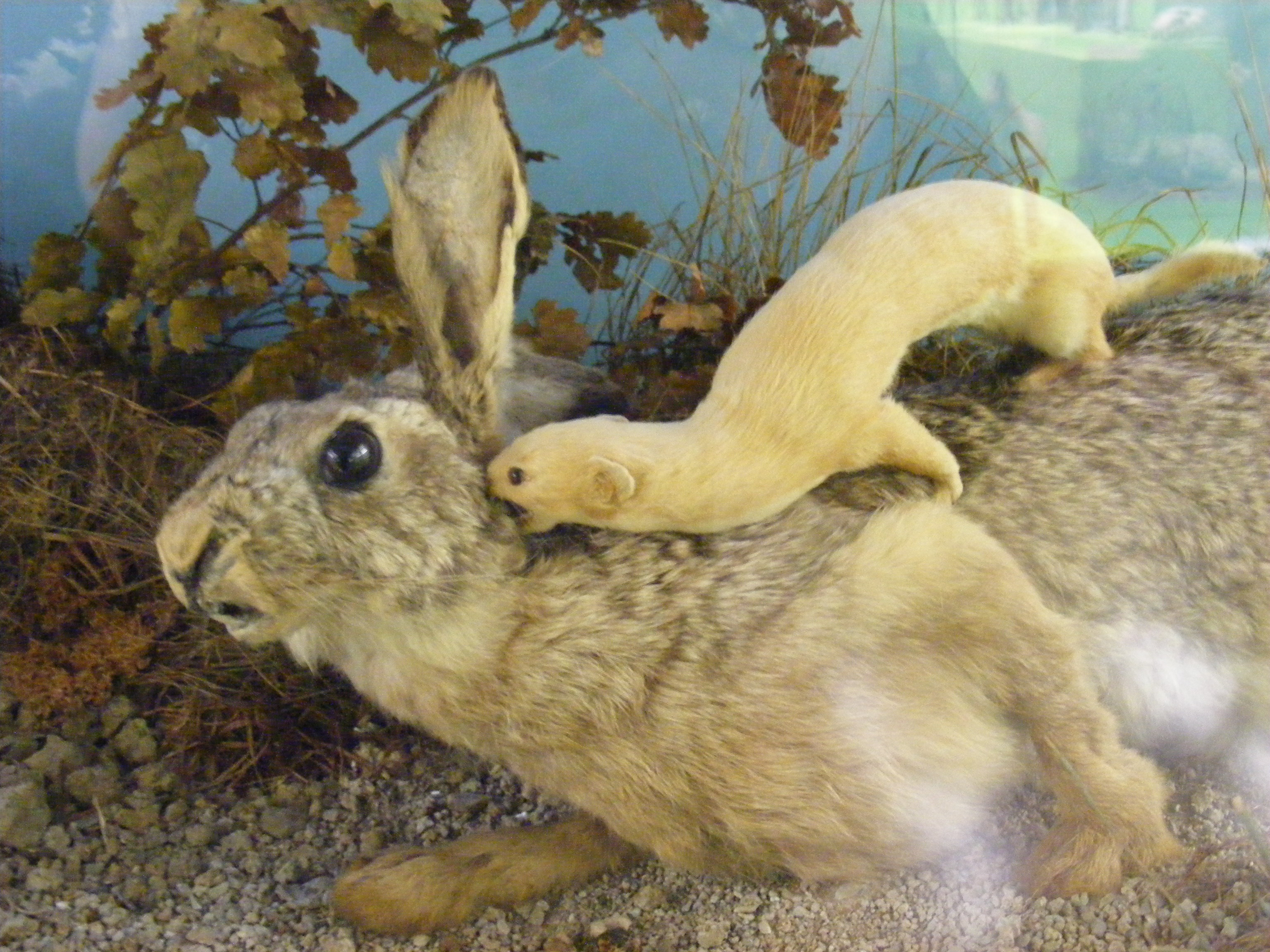
Taxidermy exhibit showing a least weasel attacking a European hare, in the Natural History Museum of Genoa

The least weasel feeds predominantly on mouse-like rodents, including mice, hamsters, gerbils and others. It usually does not attack adult hamsters and rats. Frogs, fish, small birds and bird eggs are rarely eaten. It can deal with adult pikas and gerbils, but usually cannot overcome brown rats and sousliks. Exceptional cases are known of least weasels killing prey far larger than themselves, such as capercaillies, hazel hens and hares. In England, a favoured prey item is the field vole (Microtus agrestis). These have fluctuations in population size, and in years of abundance may form up to 54% of the weasel's diet. In years of scarcity, birds form a greater proportion of the diet and female least weasels may fail to breed.

Despite its small size, the least weasel is a fierce hunter, capable of killing a rabbit five to 10 times its own weight. Although they are commonly taken, the rabbits are usually young specimens, and become an important food source during the spring, when small rodents are scarce and rabbit kits are plentiful. Male least weasels take a higher proportion of rabbits than females, as well as an overall greater variety of prey. This is linked to the fact that being larger, and having vaster territorial ranges than females, males have more opportunities to hunt a greater diversity of prey.

The least weasel forages undercover, to avoid being seen by foxes and birds of prey. It is adapted for pursuing its prey down tunnels, though it may also bolt prey from a burrow and kill it in the open. The least weasel kills small prey, such as voles, with a bite to the occipital region of the skull or the neck, dislocating the cervical vertebrae. Large prey typically dies of blood loss or circulatory shock. When food is abundant, only a small portion of the prey is eaten, usually the brain. The average daily food intake is 35 g (1.2 oz), which is equivalent to 30–35% of the animal's body weight.

=== Predators and competitors ===
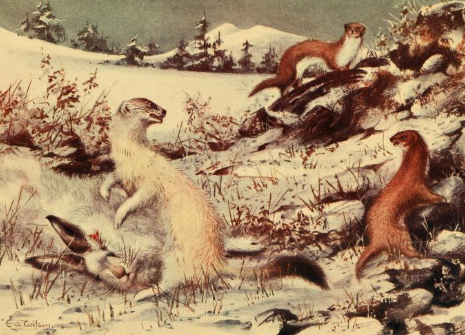
Least weasels driven from a mountain hare carcass by a stoat, as illustrated in Barrett-Hamilton's A History of British Mammals

The least weasel is small enough to be preyed upon by a range of other predators. Least weasel remains have been found in the excrement of red foxes, sables, steppe and forest polecat, stoats, eagle owls and buzzards. The owls most efficient at capturing least weasels are barn, barred, and great horned owls. Other birds of prey threatening to the least weasel include broad-winged and rough-legged buzzards. Some snake species may prey on the least weasel, including the black rat snake and copperhead. Aside from its smaller size, the least weasel is more vulnerable to predation than the stoat because it lacks a black predator deflection mark on the tail.

In areas where the least weasel is sympatric with the stoat, the two species compete with each other for rodent prey. The weasel manages to avoid too much competition by living in more upland areas, feeding on smaller prey and being capable of entering smaller holes. It actively avoids encounters with stoats, though female weasels are less likely to stop foraging in the presence of stoats, perhaps because their smaller size allows them to quickly escape into holes.

=== Diseases and parasites ===
Ectoparasites known to infest weasels include the louse Trichodectes mustelae and the mites Demodex and Psoregates mustela. The species may catch fleas from the nests and burrows of its prey. Flea species known to infest weasels include Ctenophthalmus bisoctodentatus and Palaeopsylla m. minor, which they get from moles, P. s. soricis, which they get from shrews, Nosopsyllus fasciatus, which they get from rodents and Dasypsyllus gallinulae which they get from birds.

Helminths known to infest weasels include the trematode Alaria, the nematodes Capillaria, Filaroides and Trichinella and the cestode Taenia. Least weasels are commonly infected with the nematode Skrjabingylus nasicola, adults of which are found in the nasal sinuses and can damage the skull. There is no evidence that this has serious detrimental effects on even heavily infested animals.

== Conservation ==
The least weasel is listed as Least Concern on the IUCN Red List, because of its wide global distribution and large population that is thought to be not in decline.

== In folklore and mythology ==
=== Macedonian and Greek culture ===
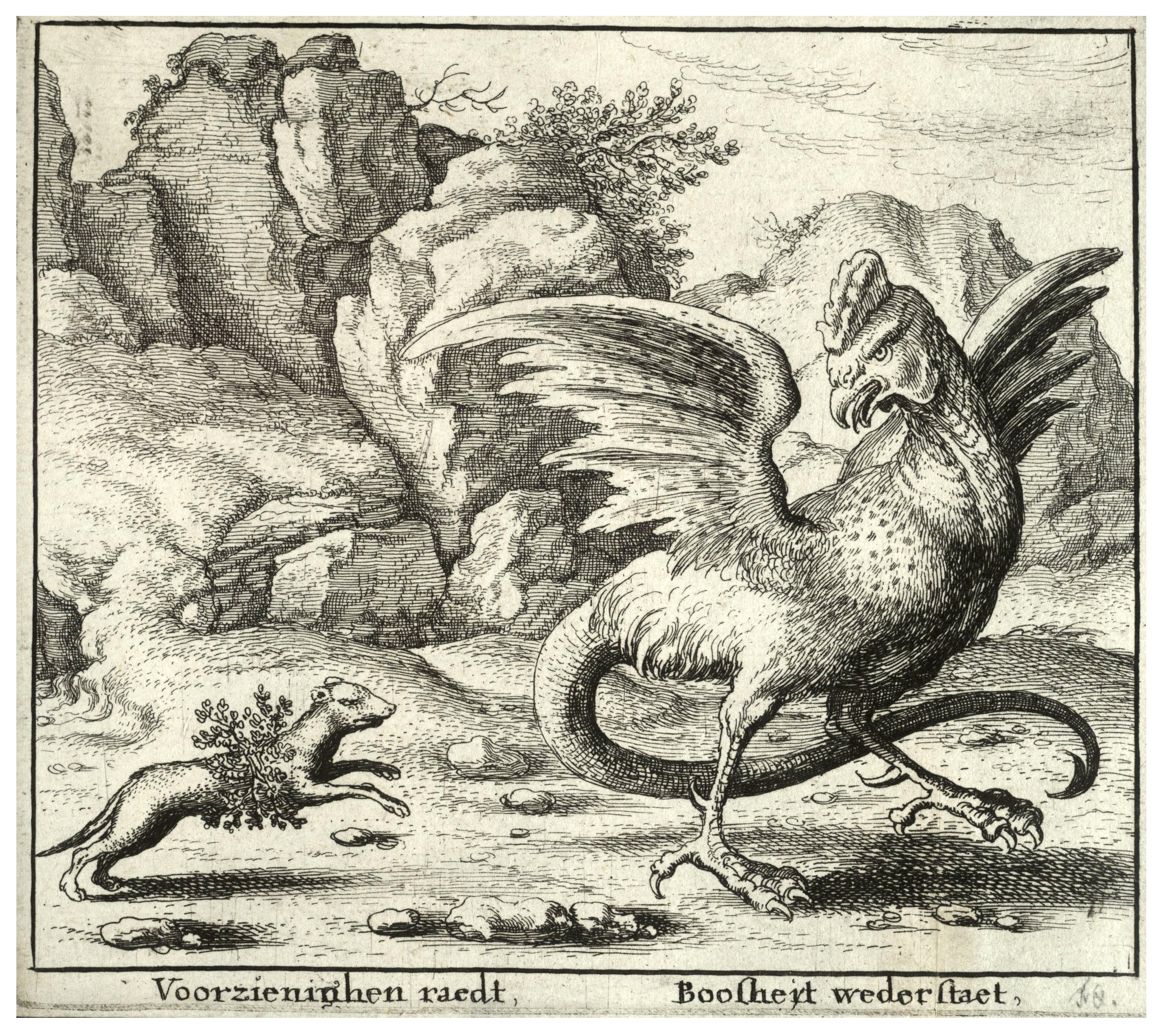
17th century print of a least weasel confronting a basilisk

The Ancient Macedonians believed that to see a least weasel was a good omen. In some districts of Macedon, women who suffered from headaches after having washed their heads in water drawn overnight would assume that a weasel had previously used the water as a mirror, but they would refrain from mentioning the animal's name for fear that it would destroy their clothes.

Similarly, a popular superstition in southern Greece had it that the least weasel had previously been a bride, who was transformed into a bitter animal which would destroy the wedding dresses of other brides out of jealousy. According to Pliny the Elder, the least weasel was the only animal that was capable of killing the basilisk:

To this dreadful monster the effluvium of the weasel is fatal, a thing that has been tried with success, for kings have often desired to see its body when killed; so true is it that it has pleased Nature that there should be nothing without its antidote. The animal is thrown into the hole of the basilisk, which is easily known from the soil around it being infected. The weasel destroys the basilisk by its odour, but dies itself in this struggle of nature against its own self.

=== Ojibwe and Inuit culture ===
The Ojibwe believed that the least weasel could kill the dreaded wendigo by rushing up its anus.

In Inuit mythology, the least weasel is credited with both great wisdom and courage, and whenever a mythical Inuit hero wished to accomplish a valorous task, he would generally change himself into a least weasel.

== See also ==
- Smallest organisms
