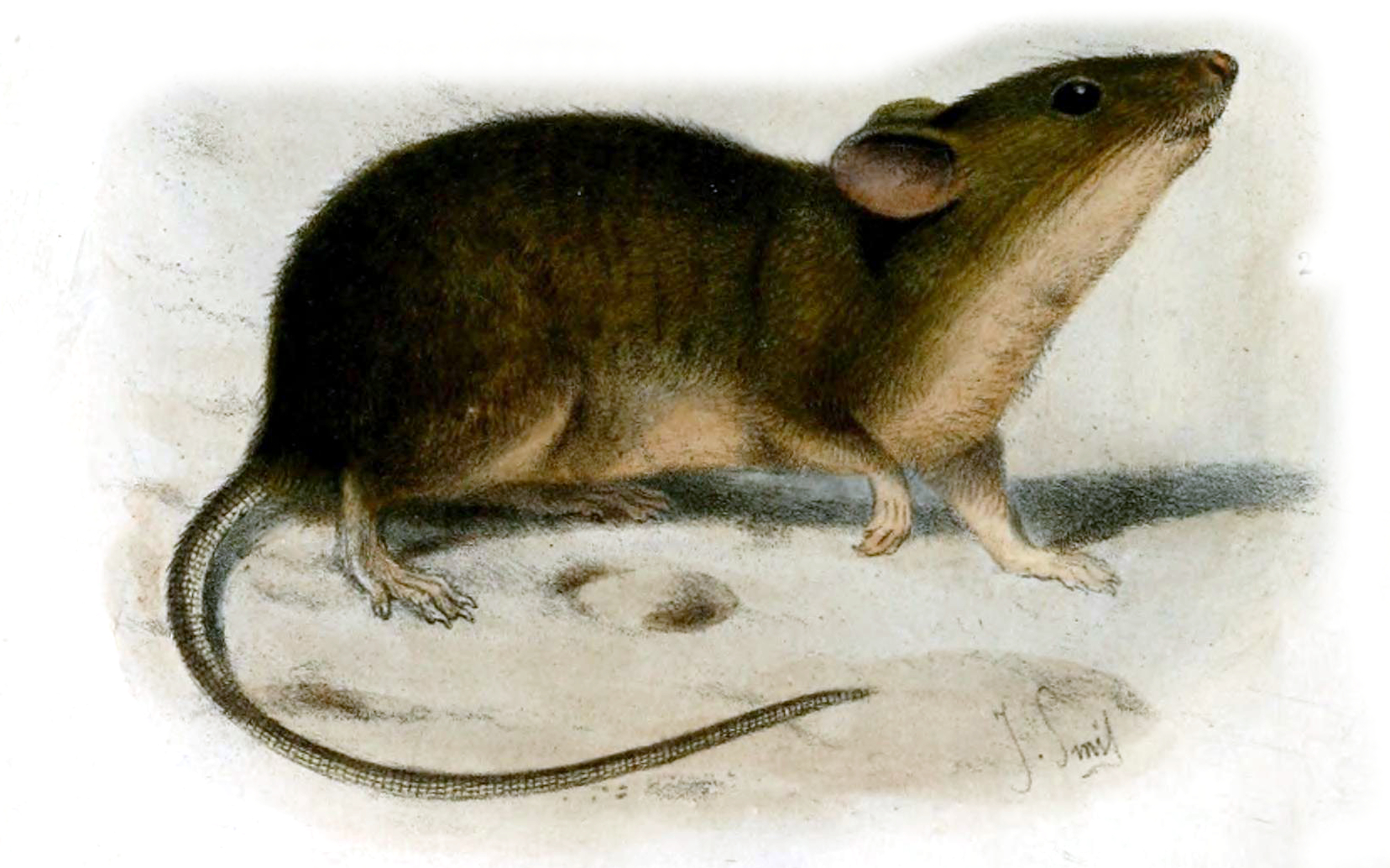

Conservation status
- Extinct (c. 1930)

Scientific classification
- Kingdom: Animalia
- Phylum: Chordata
- Class: Mammalia
- Order: Rodentia
- Family: Muridae
- Genus: Mus
- Species: M. musculus
- Subspecies: †M. m. muralis

Trinomial name
- †Mus musculus muralis Barrett-Hamilton, 1899

= St Kilda house mouse =

Extinct subspecies of rodent

The St Kilda house mouse (Mus musculus muralis) is an extinct subspecies of the house mouse found only on the islands of the St Kilda archipelago of northwest Scotland. They were first described, alongside the St Kilda field mouse, by natural historian Gerald Edwin Hamilton Barrett-Hamilton in 1899.

== Origin ==
It is uncertain when they first arrived on the islands, but it is possible that they were unwittingly transported there during the Norse period. Isolated on the islands, the St Kilda house mouse diverged from its relatives. It became larger than the mainland varieties, although it had a number of traits in common with a subspecies found on Mykines in the Faroe Islands, Mus musculus mykinessiensis.

== Extinction ==
When the last St Kildans were evacuated in 1930, the endemic house mouse became extinct very quickly, as it was associated strictly with human settlement. Some specimens exist in museums. The St Kilda field mouse (Apodemus sylvaticus hirtensis), a subspecies of the wood mouse, is still present.

== Sources ==
- Harrisson, T. H. and J. A. Moy-Thomas. 1933. "The Mice of St Kilda, with Especial Reference to Their Prospects of Extinction and Present Status". Journal of Animal Ecology, 2: 109–115.
- Musser, G. G. and M. D. Carleton. 2005. "Superfamily Muroidea". pp. 894–1531 in Mammal Species of the World a Taxonomic and Geographic Reference. D. E. Wilson and D. M. Reeder eds. Johns Hopkins University Press, Baltimore.
