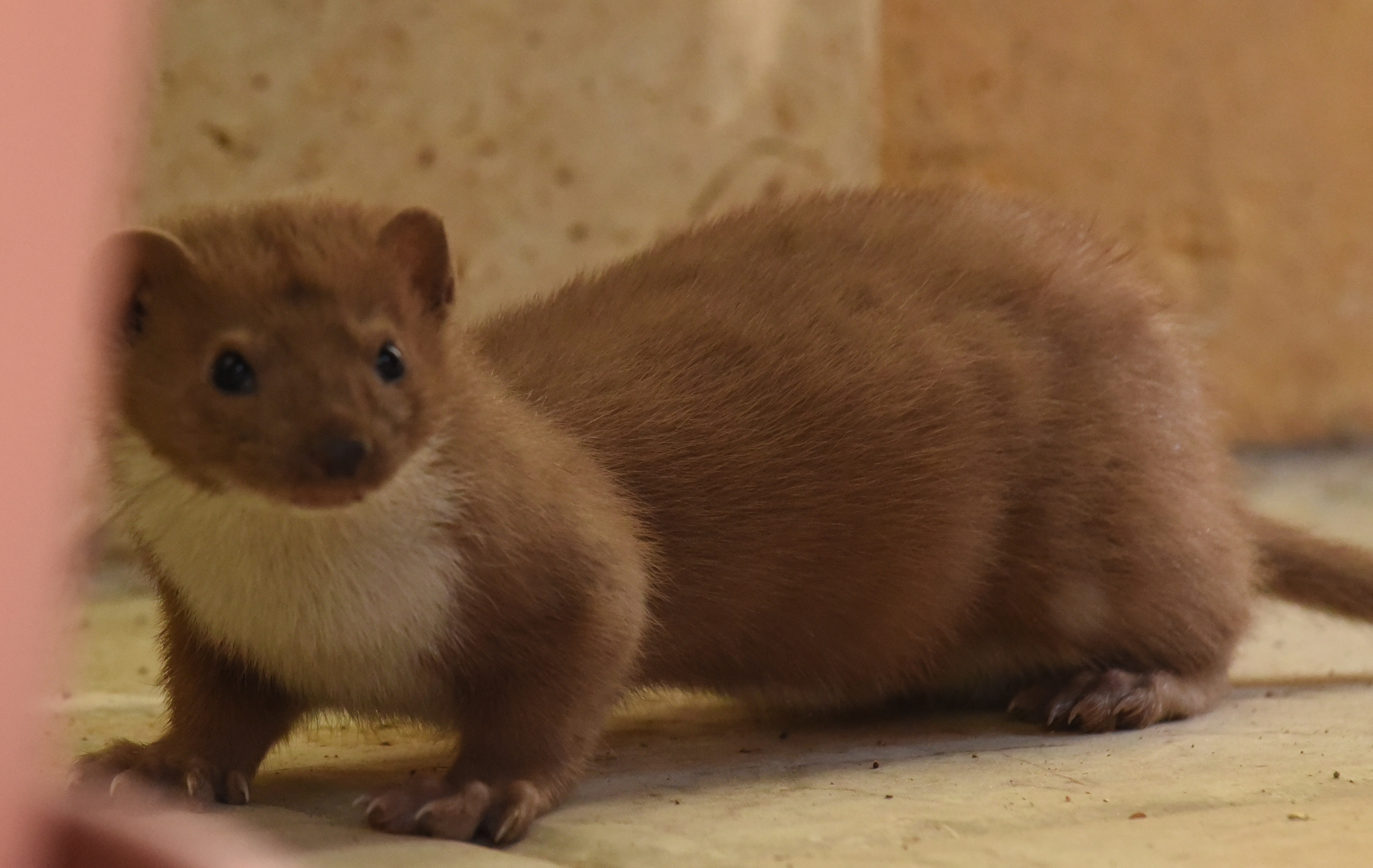

Conservation status
- Least Concern (IUCN 3.1)

Scientific classification
- Kingdom: Animalia
- Phylum: Chordata
- Class: Mammalia
- Order: Carnivora
- Family: Mustelidae
- Genus: Mustela
- Species: M. nivalis
- Subspecies: M. n. numidica
- Population: Egyptian weasel
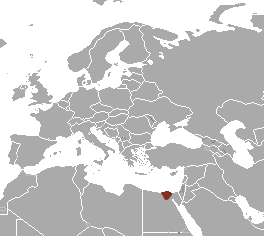
- Egyptian weasel range

Synonyms
- Mustela subpalmata Hemprich & Ehrenberg, 1833; Mustela nivalis subpalmata

= Egyptian weasel =

Population of least weasels in Egypt

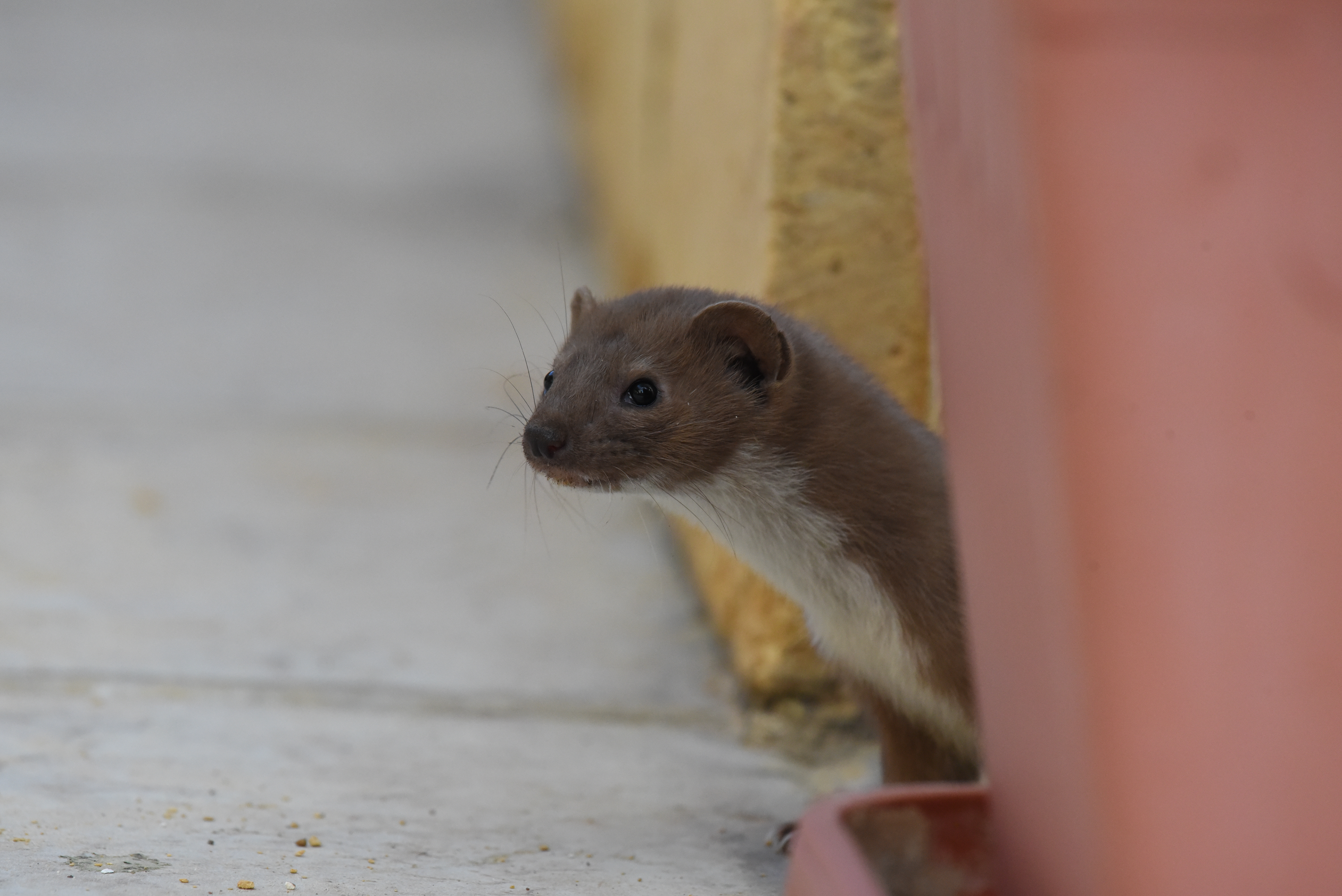
In Cairo

The Egyptian weasel is a unique population of the least weasel endemic to northern Egypt. It is listed as Least Concern on the IUCN Red List. It was formerly considered a distinct species, as Mustela subpalmata.

== Taxonomy ==
Due to its great resemblance to the least weasel (M. nivalis), the Egyptian weasel was only suggested to be a separate species in 1992, based on measures of skull sizes. However, results of a phylogenetic study indicate that mitochondrial DNA supports the Egyptian weasel to be an isolated population of Mustela nivalis, namely the subspecies numidica, which occurs in other parts of the Mediterranean basin, rather than a distinct species, or even a subspecies. The American Society of Mammalogists has since recognized it as conspecific with M. nivalis.

== Characteristics ==
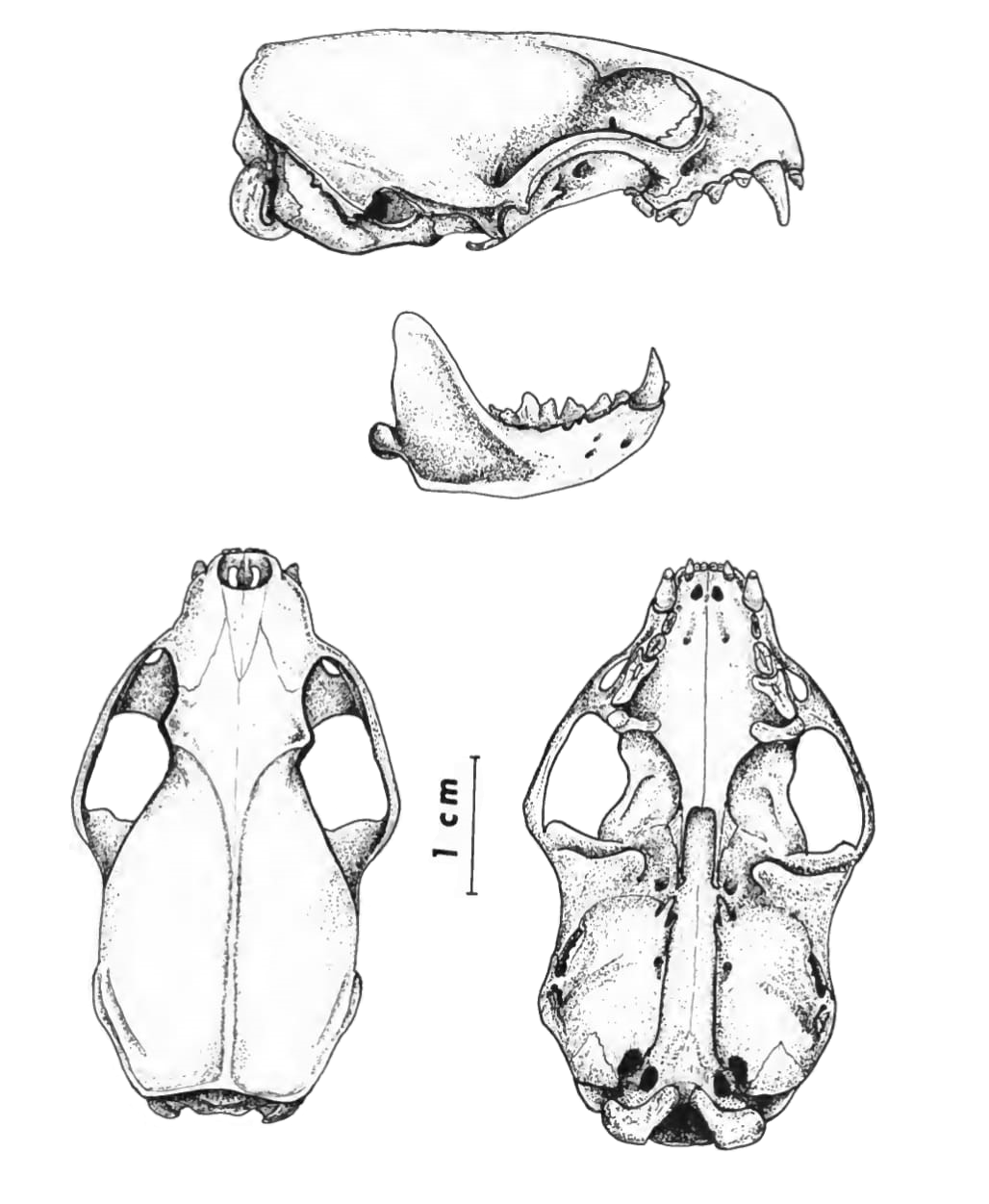
Skull of an Egyptian weasel

The Egyptian weasel has short legs, a small head, and small ears. Its tail is long and thin. The weasel has a broad snout. The upper part of the body is brown and the lower part is cream-colored.

Sizes for the Egyptian weasel are:

- Male head–body length: 36.1–43 cm (14.2–16.9 in)
- Female head–body length: 32.6–39 cm (12.8–15.4 in)
- Male tail length: 10.9–12.9 cm (4.3–5.1 in)
- Female tail length: 9.4–11 cm (3.7–4.3 in)
- Male weight: 60–130 g (2.1–4.6 oz)
- Female weight: 45–60 g (1.6–2.1 oz).

== Distribution and habitat ==
The Egyptian weasel occurs in northern Egypt from Alexandria eastward to Port Said and southward through the delta and as far south as Beni Suef, located 115 km (71 mi) south of Cairo. It lives in the same places as humans, including cities and villages and has been described as an obligate synanthrope.

== Behaviour and ecology ==
The Egyptian weasel is omnivorous and includes a significant amount (~50%) of vegetables and fruit in its diet, as well as waste human food and animals including rodents, chicks of poultry, rabbits, fish and insects. Their varied and opportunistic diet reflects their opportunistic synanthropic lifestyle. The males of the Egyptian weasel are solitary and highly territorial, marking the territorial boundaries with urine and faeces. The female may establish a territory within a male's territory within which she will make a nest in a cavity, wall crevice or rock pile. She defends this territory from other females.

=== Reproduction ===
During courtship, the pair trill and chatter and copulation can be quite a loud affair. After copulating she may remain with the male or the pair may separate and seek other mates. The females gives birth in her nest to a litter of between four and nine young, up to three times a year, if food supply allows.

== Threats ==
At present, it is not considered threatened. Future potential threats are chemicals such as rodenticides, predation by domestic dogs and diseases.
