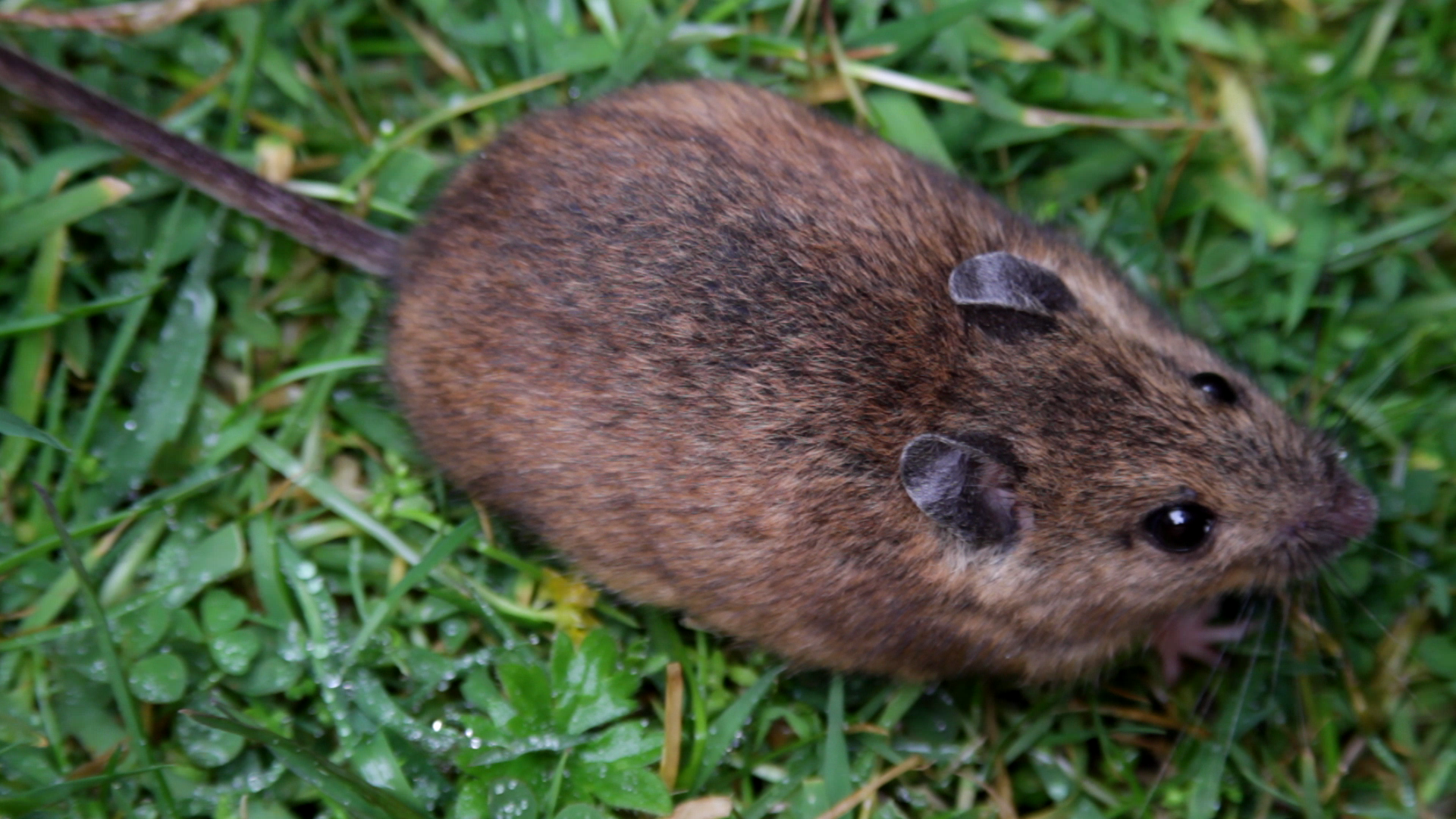

Scientific classification
- Kingdom: Animalia
- Phylum: Chordata
- Class: Mammalia
- Order: Rodentia
- Family: Muridae
- Genus: Apodemus
- Species: A. sylvaticus
- Subspecies: A. s. hirtensis

Trinomial name
- Apodemus sylvaticus hirtensis (Barrett-Hamilton, 1899)

= St Kilda field mouse =

Subspecies of rodent

The St Kilda field mouse (Apodemus sylvaticus hirtensis) is a subspecies of the wood mouse that is endemic to the Scottish archipelago of St Kilda, the island 64 kilometres (40 mi) west of Benbecula in the Outer Hebrides, and 160 kilometres (100 mi) from mainland Scotland. Unique to the islands, the mouse is believed to have arrived on the boats of Viking settlers more than a millennium ago. It is not to be confused with the St Kilda house mouse (Mus musculus muralis), a subspecies of the house mouse which is now extinct.

The last remaining human inhabitants of St Kilda abandoned the islands on 29 August 1930. Thereafter the mice that survived, even those occupying houses abandoned by the St Kildans, were field mice that had moved into the houses from the hills. The islands' house mice could not survive the harsh conditions for more than two years after the archipelago was abandoned by its human population. The islands currently have temporary human habitations. While field mice are widespread on Hirta, their concentration is more pronounced in the old village areas where holes provide access into buildings. Though rarely observed by casual visitors, the mouse is common and is present in every part of the habitat, from the harbour to the high point.

== Description ==
The mouse has black eyes, small peaked ears, and is fairly uniform in colour: mainly brown, with a lighter shade of fur on its underside. It is generally twice as heavy as field mice found on the mainland, with a mass of between 50 grams (1.8 oz) and 70 grams (2.5 oz), and has longer hair and a longer tail. The evolution of a larger size has been credited to a lack of predators in its island habitat, which allows the mice to grow larger to preserve heat and increase fat storage. The mouse can reach a maximum length of about 17 centimetres (6.7 in). It is found across the main island, Hirta, especially in the remains of human settlements, as well as on the island of Dùn. It is not found on Boreray. Studies of the fur of the mice have recorded the flea species Ctenophthalmus nobilis, and Nosopsyllus fasciatus on the mouse as well as the mite Typhloceras poppei. Studies of the intestines have observed the nematode Tictularia cristata and the cestode Hymenolepsis diminuta.

== Diet ==
The mouse is an opportunistic omnivore. Its diet includes insects, snails, seeds, and moss, as well as human litter and animal carcasses. With only one other naturalised mammal, the Soay sheep, which eats grasses and herbs, the St Kilda field mouse faces little competition for food on the islands.

== History ==
Unique to the islands, the ancestors of the St Kilda's field mouse are believed to have arrived on the ships of Viking settlers. The taxon was first described in 1899 by Gerald Edwin Hamilton Barrett-Hamilton as the separate species Apodemus hirtensis. A year later in a specific review of mouse species the taxon was reclassified as a subspecies of the wood mouse Apodemus sylvaticus.

Studies of the mouse populations on the islands were carried out in 1931, 1939 and 1955. These studies documented the rapid extinction of the endemic house mouse subspecies (which was dependent for its survival on grain and other commodities used by the islands' human inhabitants), and its subsequent replacement by the field mouse, through a process of niche expansion.
