= Gerald Barrett-Hamilton =

Irish zoologist

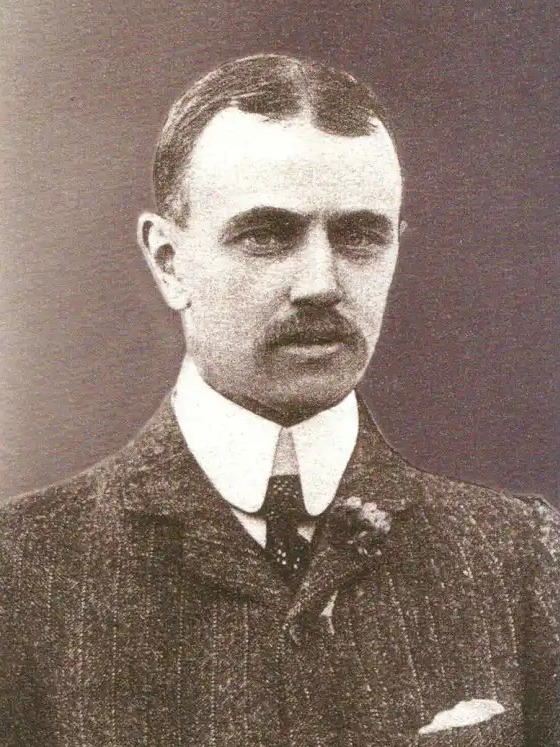
Gerald Edwin Hamilton Barrett-Hamilton

Major Gerald Edwin Hamilton Barrett-Hamilton (18 May 1871 – 17 January 1914) was a British and Irish natural historian, co-author with M. A. C. Hinton of A History of British Mammals, which remained "the most thorough, accurate and scientific publication" on British mammals until the 1950s.

== Biography ==
Barrett-Hamilton was born in Ahmednagar, India, of Irish parents, who returned and settled at Kilmanock in County Wexford when the boy was three years old. He was educated at Harrow and Trinity College, Cambridge, spending summer holidays botanising at home under the encouragement of Alexander Goodman More. From 1887 to 1908 Barrett-Hamilton contributed papers on Wexford plants to the Journal of Botany, British and Foreign and to The Irish Naturalist. He held a commission in the 5th (Militia) Battalion of the Royal Irish Rifles, where he was appointed captain on 3 March 1897. Following the outbreak of the Second Boer War, he was appointed Instructor of Musketry on 28 February 1900, and saw active service in South Africa 1901–1902. After the war ended in June 1902, he left Cape Town in the SS Dunera in late September 1902, arriving at Southampton early the following month. He was High Sheriff of Wexford in 1904 and later worked in the Natural History Museum, London, and worked on various Government investigations. He married Maud Charlotte Eland, of Ireland. They had six children.

In his work as a natural historian, he described a great number of new species of small mammal on the islands around the British Isles, notably the house mice and field mice of St. Kilda which he called Mus muralis and Mus hirtensis, believing that these had evolved in situ having colonised the islands naturally via land or ice-bridges. Although this has been demonstrated to be wrong, and many of his described species are now regarded as island forms rather than species in their own right, his contribution to natural history was enormous. He was a valued contributor to the Irish Naturalist journal. His papers and correspondence are held at the University of Manitoba.

He died on 17 January 1914 of pneumonia following a heart attack on South Georgia Island in the South Antarctic whilst leading a British Government investigation into the whale and seal fisheries there.

Michael Nesbitt (Barrett-Hamilton's grandson) had a copper plaque made with Barrett-Hamilton's photo engraved and sent it to the Norwegian Anglican Church in Grytvike, to be hung with prior permission from the South Georgia Trust.

== Works ==
- 'On a collection of mice (Mus hirtensis and M. muralis) from St Kilda', Annals of Scottish Natural History, 57 (1906), 1–4.
- A History of British Mammals, part completed to vol 21, 1910–1921
