= Dietary biology of the Eurasian eagle-owl =

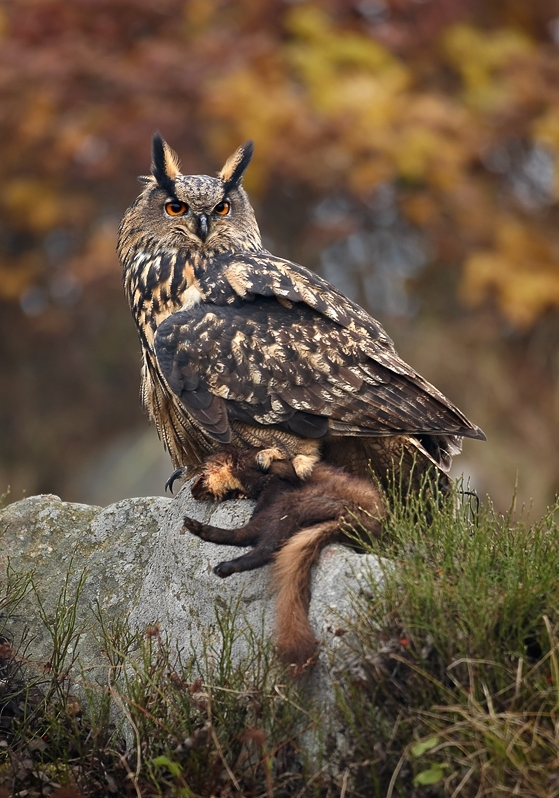
With pine marten prey in Czech Republic

The Eurasian eagle-owl (Bubo bubo) may well be the most powerful extant species of owl, able to attack and kill large prey far beyond the capacities of most other living owls. However, the species is even more marked for its ability to live on more diverse prey than possibly any other comparably sized raptorial bird, which, given its considerable size, is almost fully restricted to eagles. This species can adapt to surprisingly small prey where it is the only kind available and to large prey where it is abundant. Eurasian eagle-owls feed most commonly on small mammals weighing 100 g (0.22 lb) or more, although nearly 45% of the prey species recorded have an average adult body mass of less than 100 g (3.5 oz). Usually 55-80% of the food of eagle-owls is mammalian.

== Hunting and digestion ==
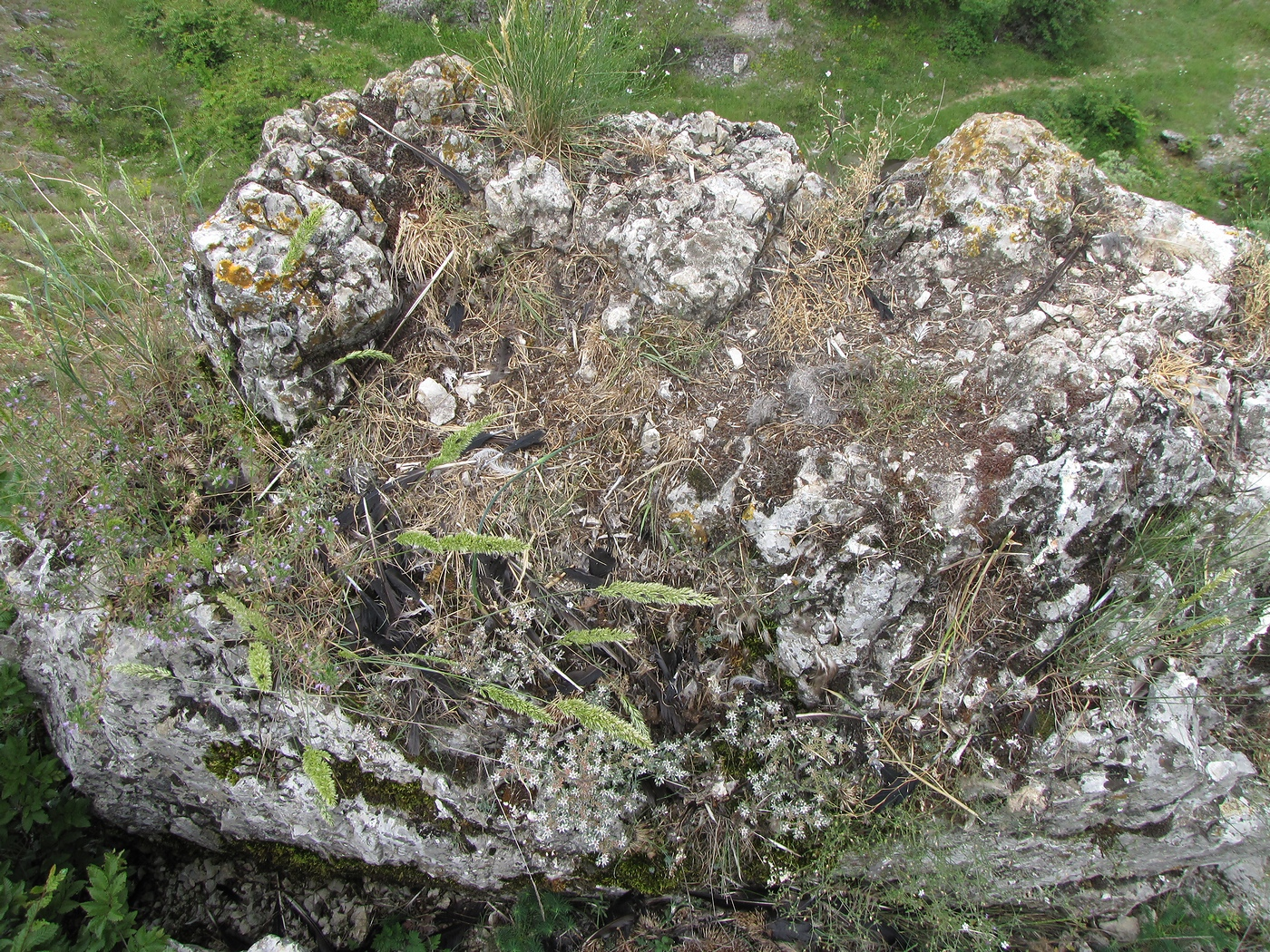
An old Eurasian eagle-owl feeding site, with whitewash remnants visible.

Hunting mainly consist of the owl watching from a perch for prey activity and then swooping down swiftly once prey is spotted. The prey is often killed quickly by the eagle owl's powerful grip and talons though is sometimes bitten on the head to be killed as well. Then the prey item is swallowed whole or torn into pieces with the bill. The same basic hunting and killing methods are used by all owls in the genus Bubo, except that the snowy owls (Bubo scandiacus) regularly watch for prey from a ground position. Most hunting occurs in wood-cloaked openings, often those carved out by wetlands or watersheds. While they can and do hunt within woodlands, they are not well suited to hunting in areas with dense understories, thick foliage or tree thickets, as they seem to hunt firstly by vision and only secondarily by sounds, unlike some other owls. Eurasian eagle-owls are too heavy with relatively modest wing areas to hunt extensively on the wing although this species’ relatively short, broad wings allow it low-speed maneuverability in the moments of take off after spotting a prey item. Because of the limits of its flying abilities, the Eurasian eagle-owl requires ample, elevated perches from which to watch for prey activity and thus in most areas it will not hunt extensively in open, treeless areas, unlike smaller owls like the barn owl (Tyto alba). Tree branches are often the main hunting perches used but they will also use rock formations, rubble with large rocks, hills with tall grasses or even a building, tall pole or other elevated manmade perch. Occasionally, they may capture other birds on the wing, including nocturnal migrants, taking advantage of their distraction and diminished visual acuity to intercept them in mid-flight. They seem to hunt mostly by opportunity, taking whatever detectable prey item that is available, preferably those that are active. Most prey, even up to the size of small rabbits, are swallowed whole. While a small rodent can easily be swallowed in an instant, if the prey item is large, the swallowing process can appear grueling and grotesque and in some cases eagle-owl nestlings have choked to death while attempting to swallow overly large prey (i.e. moorhens). Small prey is often swallowed immediately after capture, although occasionally it is carried in the bill to the nest for the young or to a roost for quick consumption. Larger prey is normally carried in the owl's feet and is more likely than smallish prey to be brought to the nest due to its nutritional value. Exceptionally large prey (probably any over 3,000 g (6.6 lb)) is consumed on the ground where it is killed, possibly being torn apart into manageable pieces. This leaves the owl vulnerable to loss of their prey to scavengers or to confrontations with heavier predators. The undigestable portions of prey are regurgitated in the form of pellets as in all owls. Pellets of the Eurasian eagle-owl average around 75 mm × 32 mm (3.0 in × 1.3 in), thus they are around the same size as those of most other large Bubo owls, even the notably smaller great horned owl (B. virginianus). In some cases, pellets of Bubo owls can range up to 150 mm (5.9 in) in length. Eagle-owl pellets average slightly larger (about 10%) than those of great grey owls (Strix nebulosa). As is the case with all owls, pellets are indisputably the best method to examine the main diversity of prey consumed by an owl. However, it is also important to examine the prey remains left around a roost or nest when available. Larger prey, which may be torn apart before the eating of portions or fleshy parts of the prey item, is frequently determined solely by remains rather pellets as are birds, in which the wings, feet and some feathers may be removed before consumption. As in the great horned owl, after capturing larger prey, the Eurasian eagle-owl often beheads it. In part, this may be due to making prey easier to carry off and, in both large owl species, it is considered a signature indicator for predator identification.

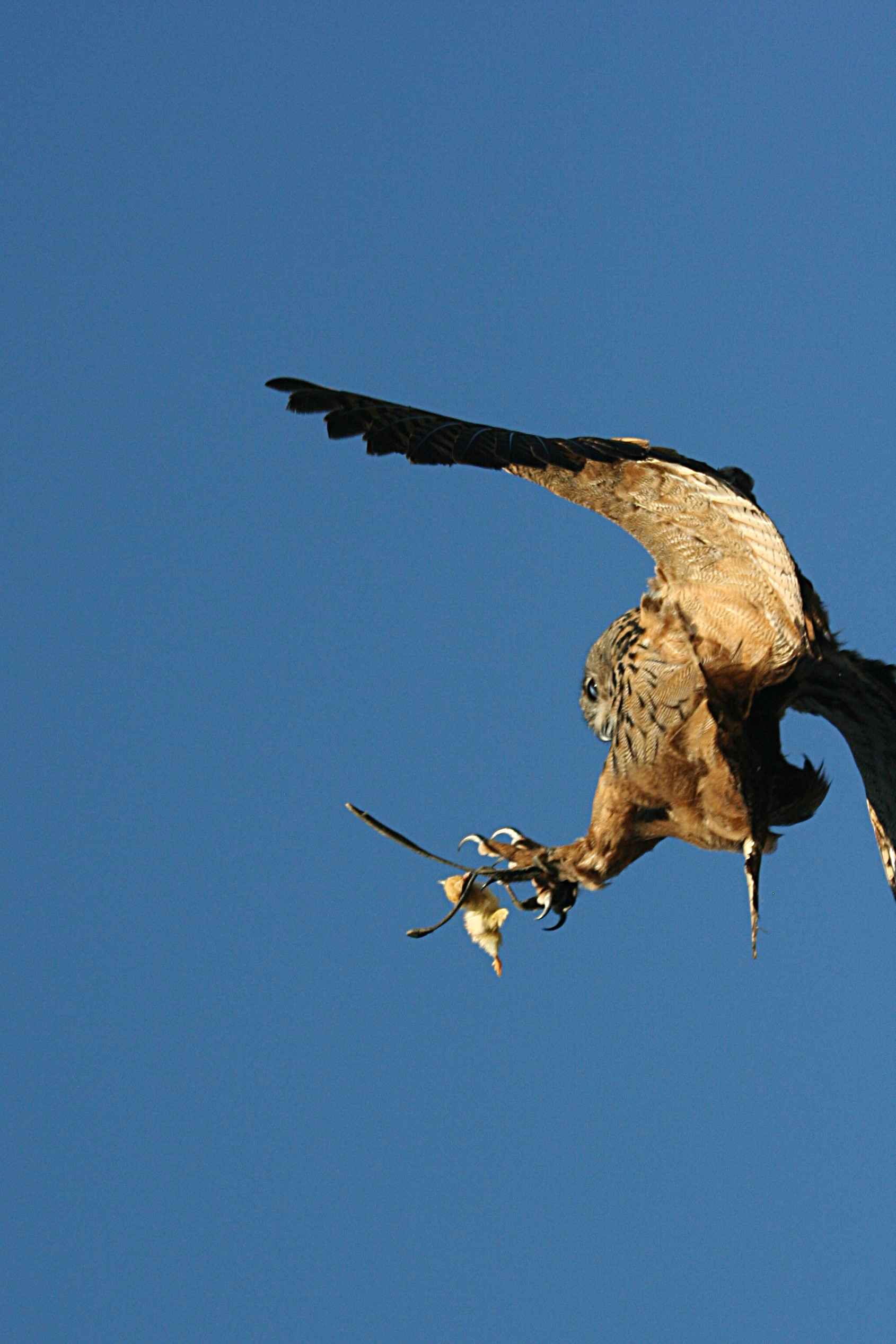
A captive Eurasian eagle-owl catches its food in mid-air.

== Summary of general diet ==
The diet is generally more diverse than any other co-existing owl but often focuses predominantly on a particular range of prey species, with two to four species often making up the majority of the diet. Studies conducted over the course of years has shown that the regional diet often changes dramatically from year to year. This is partially driven by the cyclical population trends of much of their prey as well as by habitat changes, which are often due to human activities. The primary prey species varies by region but is comprised mainly by small mammals such as voles, rats, mice, rabbits and hares. In Europe, the five main prey species are, in order of extent of reporting and numeric abundance in dietary studies: the brown rat (Rattus norvegius), which has now occupied edge habitats (although generally associated with man) in almost every part of Europe excluding the colder north; the common vole (Microtus arvalis), often the most abundant native, small mammal in wild portions of Europe; the European hedgehog (Erinaceus concolor), which occupies wooded edges across western Europe alongside the eagle-owls; the European water vole (Arvicola amphibius), a unique, large vole occupying the wetland edges often hunted by eagle-owls; and the European rabbit (Oryctolagus cuniculus), which has a very close relationship with the eagle-owls found throughout the Iberian Peninsula and the massifs of France. As the distribution of the Eurasian eagle-owls moves west (and south), the primarily prey species gradually change but often continues to be dominated in number by small rodents and in biomass by slightly larger mammals such as hedgehogs and hares and rabbits.

A very large balance of the prey range can also be comprised by birds and other prey including reptiles, amphibians, fish, insects and other invertebrates are seemingly taken whenever they are available. All told, well more than 600 different species have been identified as prey of Eurasian eagle-owls. Their diet includes basically all the same prey as all sympatric diurnal raptors in the genera Buteo, Aquila and Haliaeetus. The total number of prey species may even surpass that of the great horned owl and may well be the greatest of any raptorial bird on the Eurasian continent. Among five segments of Europe the average prey diversity per region was 63 species, a higher number than any of the other 40 raptorial bird species studied there. The mean mass of prey per study has varied from as little as 84.2 g (2.97 oz), near the now former Aral Sea in Turkmenistan with the Turkmen jerboa (Jaculus turkmenicus) being the primary prey species, to 1,037.9 g (2.288 lb), in Spain with the European rabbit being the primary prey species. Remarkably, in northern Spain, where the rabbit is now extirpated (as was the eagle-owl for a time in the 20th century), the average weight of prey can dip as low as 87 g (3.1 oz). In comparison, the lightest mean prey mass in dietary studies of the great horned owl was 22.5 g (0.79 oz) while the highest was 610.4 g (1.346 lb).

Most dietary studies place the average weight of Eurasian eagle-owl prey in the zone of 100 to 500 g (0.22 to 1.10 lb), thus the species fits well within the rule of thumb that most prey weigh no more than 20% of the raptorial bird's own weight. The average prey weight in comparison to the eagle-owl's body mass is reportedly average and unremarkable for both owls and raptors in general, the average prey per one study was 7.2% of the eagle-owls’ body mass. The European raptorial birds most likely to attack prey of a relatively large size compared to themselves were the black kite (Milvus migrans), whose average prey was 35.7% of its own weight, and the Eurasian pygmy owl (Glaucidium passerinum), whose average prey was 31.7% of its own weight. On the other hand, when rabbit numbers were at their peak, the average prey mass in Spain may range up to at least 55% of the eagle-owls’ own body mass in that population. A raptorial prey comparison estimated that the mean prey weight for eagle-owls in Europe was 294.7 g (10.40 oz) as a mean among 5 main regions, the highest of any owl but similar or slightly lighter than the European average for northern goshawks (Accipiter gentilis) and considerably lower only than two widespread European eagles. Per that study the average prey weight of the great horned owl in 4 North American regions was much lower (averaging only 64 g (2.3 oz)). In Mediterranean scrub, the average mammalian prey of the Eurasian eagle-owl was nearly five times heavier than those of great horned owls from similar habitats in Chile, California and Colorado, where in combination the horned owl's mammalian food averaged 230 g (8.1 oz). However, a comparison between eagle- and horned owls based upon six comparable biomes in the Americas and Eurasia found the great horned owl's prey averaged 372 g (13.1 oz), improbably slightly higher than the eagle-owl at 327 g (11.5 oz). If known Asian studies are mixed with European ones, the average prey weight for the Eurasian eagle-owl overall may also roughly be 372 g (13.1 oz). Among sympatric owls in Europe, the mean prey weight of long-eared owls (Asio otus) was found to be 32 g (1.1 oz), the tawny owl (Strix aluco) took prey weighing a mean of 34.5 g (1.22 oz) (though locally can be as high as 130 g (4.6 oz)) and short-eared owls (Asio flammeus) mean prey weigh was 35 g (1.2 oz). A study in Finland seeking to distinguish the differences in prey taken by females and smaller male eagle-owls found that the two sexes prey averaged 828 g (1.825 lb) and 575 g (1.268 lb), respectively. The species taken as food by the two sexes there were largely the same but the female simply often caught the larger prey individuals.

== Prey types ==
=== Rodents ===
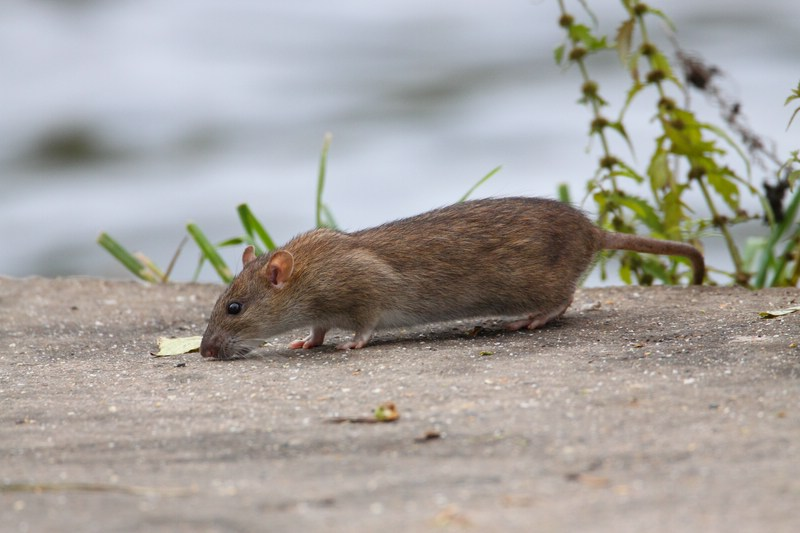
The brown rat is now arguably the most significant prey species for eagle-owls in Europe.

In terms of sheer quantitative abundance, rodents are by far the most dominant prey group in the diet of the Eurasian eagle-owl. Roughly 130 species of rodent are known to have been taken by these owls. Due to their small sizes, however, rodent prey often comprise a relatively small portion of the prey biomass, excepting relatively large rodents such as rats and hamsters, some of which weigh at least 300 g (11 oz). In many parts of Europe, the most numerous prey in dietary studies are the 360 g (13 oz) brown rat and the 28.5 g (1.01 oz) common vole, followed by the nearly as widespread 40 g (1.4 oz) field vole (Microtus agrestis). Among the areas where the common vole was the leading prey species included southern Sweden, Germany, Poland, the Czech Republic, and Slovakia. In areas that have undergone more heavy development, the brown rat predominates, being the leading prey item in several parts of France including Côte-d'Or, Lozère and even the remote Pyrenees, Belgium, the Italian Alps, and Brașov, Romania. The brown rat is even the primary prey in Lebanon despite it being tied solely to human habitations as the environment is often too arid to allow it to survive further afield. Black rats (Rattus rattus), at 200 g (7.1 oz), are also hunted but rarely in equal number to the generally more successful brown rats. In Norway and Finland, field voles were the most numerous prey species, per one study in the latter country it made up 30.1% of the food but only provided 3.3% of the prey biomass. The European water vole, averaging at 75 to 140 g (2.6 to 4.9 oz), was the main prey species in Styria, Austria, although considerably secondary in biomass to hedgehogs, as well as in central Sweden. The water vole often the second or third most regularly found prey species in several other European studies. In Samara, Russia, the diet is dominated by the European water vole, although other species such as European hamsters (Cricetus cricetus) and European hares (Lepus europaeus) (both also significant prey there) probably outweigh them in biomass contribution. The common vole and European water vole together made up roughly 80% of the prey by number in the High Tatras of Slovakia and more than 60% of the diet in bordering Poland.

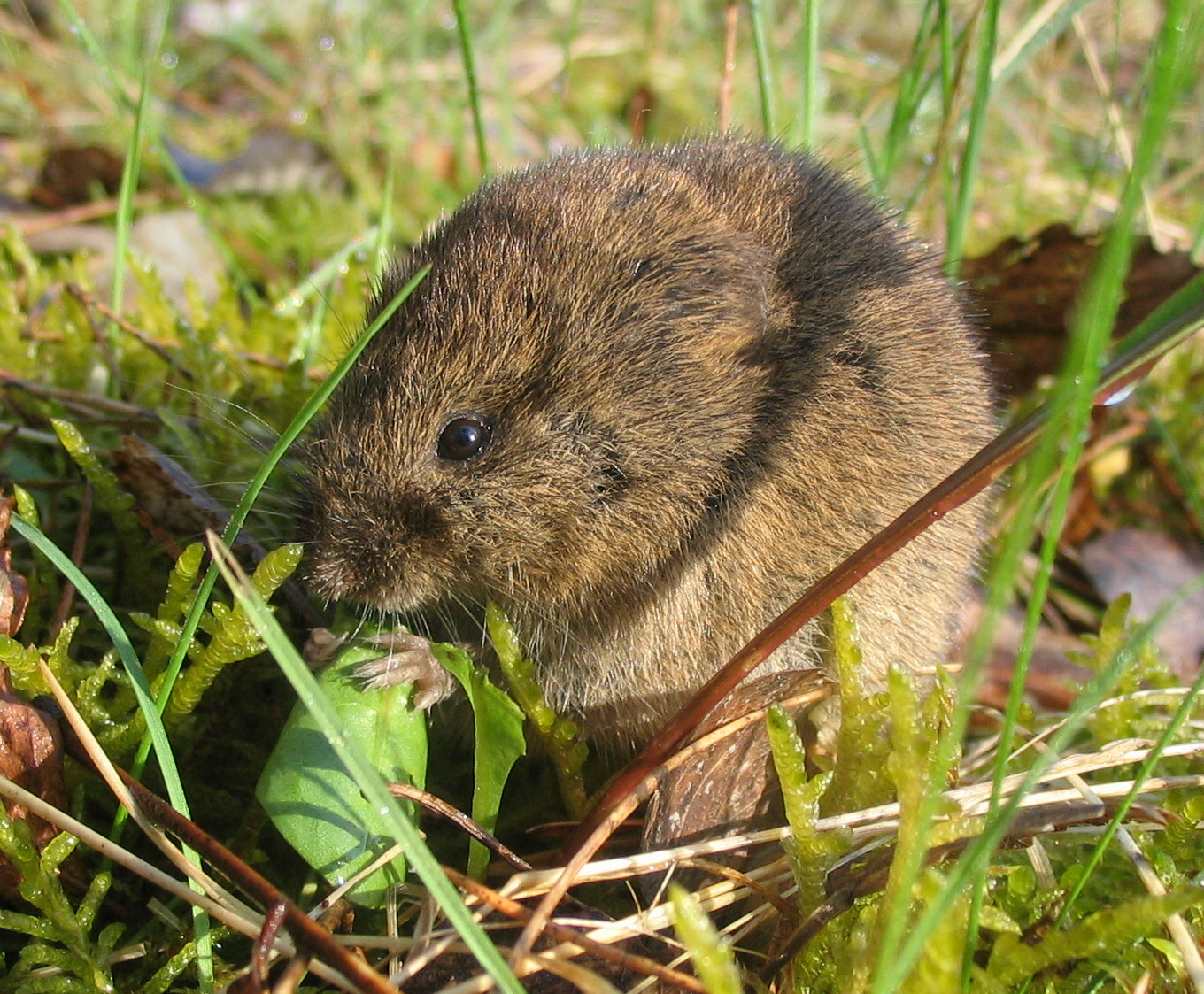
The common vole is one of the most important foods for Eurasian eagle-owls.

In the northern extremes of their range, Eurasian eagle-owls tend to have a less varied diet than those to the south and the need to catch significant numbers of rodents rises as they are often the only regularly accessible prey in sparse sub-Arctic environments. In northern Sweden, more than 60% of the food was made up of microtine rodents, i.e. the 70 g (2.5 oz) Norway lemming (Lemmus lemmus), the field vole, the European water vole and the 36 g (1.3 oz) grey red-backed vole (Myodes rufocanus). In one study from western Russia, rodents comprised more than 90% of the diet of the eagle-owls, led by the 25 g (0.88 oz) steppe lemming (Lagurus lagurus) at 24% by number, the 27 g (0.95 oz) narrow-headed vole (Microtus gregalis) at 21% and the European water vole at 17.9%. Similarly in high altitude tundra of the East Austrian Alps, nearly 90% of the food was found to be comprised by microtine rodents, the 54 g (1.9 oz) European snow vole (Chionomys nivalis) being the most frequently identified species in the diet. In Spain, the 19 g (0.67 oz) Algerian mouse (Mus spretus), at up to 41.8% of the prey by number, and 24 g (0.85 oz) wood mouse (Apodemus sylvaticus), at up to 10.5% by number, are often regularly taken, especially in regions where rabbit numbers have declined. In Romania, the 98 g (3.5 oz) Romanian hamster (Mesocricetus newtoni) and 365 g (12.9 oz) European hamster are the most prominent species found in the eagle-owl's diet, alongside the brown rat. The Romanian hamster is also dominated the prey list per a study in Bulgaria, only the European water vole follows distantly in number. Dormice are readily taken when available in Europe, especially the 127 g (4.5 oz) edible dormouse from central Europe to the eastern countries. In Slovenia, the edible dormouse was the most regularly recorded prey species, making up 20.2% of the food but it comprised 9.4% of the biomass. The edible dormouse was also the most regular prey species in Trentino-Alto Adige/Südtirol, Italy, making up 22.5% of the diet. The smaller 82.5 g (2.91 oz) garden dormouse (Eliomys quercinus) and considerably smaller 27.3 g (0.96 oz) hazel dormouse (Muscardinus avellanarius) are also occasionally predated in Europe, plus at least a half dozen other dormouse species in eastern Europe, Asia Minor and several points to the east.

Jirds, jerboas, gerbils and hamsters, particular the genera Allactaga, Ellobius, Gerbillus, Meriones, and Pygeretmus, start to become noticeable in the diet in the more arid portions of this species’ range, i.e. from Asia Minor to the Middle East and Central Asia. Relatively large species such as 100 g (3.5 oz) Tristram's jird (Meriones tristrami) and the 162 g (5.7 oz) Euphrates jerboa (Allactaga euphratica) are often amongst the more prominent species to be hunted. In western Kazakhstan, the primary foods are the 350 g (12 oz) great jerboa (Allactaga major) and 55 g (1.9 oz) northern mole vole (Ellobius talpinus) while on the Buzachi and Mangyshlak Peninsulas of the Kazakh Caspian Sea, the primary foods were the 100 g (3.5 oz) Libyan jird (Meriones libycus), 285 g (10.1 oz) great gerbil (Rhombomys opimus) and 58.7 g (2.07 oz) small five-toed jerboa (Allactaga elater). All told, in the peninsular Kazakh regions of the Caspian Sea, jirds, jerboas and gerbils made up about 92% of the food. In the Tibetan Plateau of China, the 54 g (1.9 oz) tundra vole (Microtus oeconomus) is the leading prey species, making up 53.1% of the prey. In Mongolia, two rather small rodents, the 24 g (0.85 oz) Mongolian five-toed jerboa (Allactaga sibirica), at 23.6% of the prey, and the 17 g (0.60 oz) Campbell's dwarf hamster (Phodopus campbelli), at 14.5% of the prey, make up a majority of the prey by number. In the Transbaikal, the 24 g (0.85 oz) Chinese striped hamster (Cricetulus barabensis) was the main prey species, making up 43.8% of the diet.

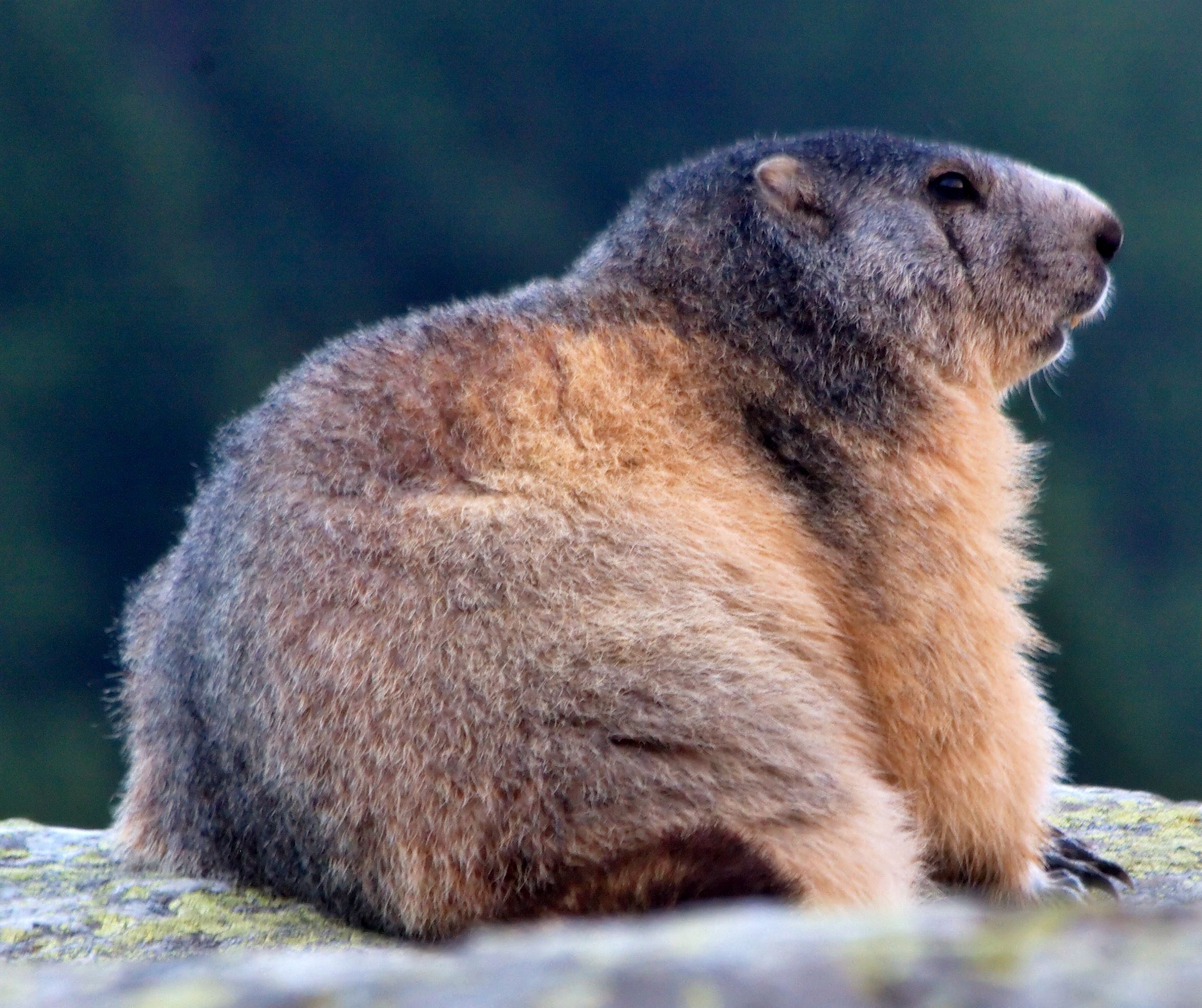
The alpine marmot is a seldom-caught but sizeable and nutritious prey item for an eagle-owl.

What all primary rodent prey species share is that they are either nocturnal or crepuscular and are often common to abundant in openings of woods and rocky environments. The reason Eurasian eagle-owls take rats, which associate rather closely with humans, much more regularly than they take house mice (Mus musculus) is not their larger size (many other rodents regularly taken by eagle-owls are as small or smaller than a house mouse) but the rat's ability to flourish along the edges of crop fields, refuse dumps, roadsides and abandoned buildings and fields, whereas the mice are more closely tied to active human habitations. A single refuse dump can host several thousand rats and eagle-owl territories that include dumps can locally expect higher productivity due to the abundance of this food source. Squirrels are readily predated but, being diurnal, are largely unavailable to this and other owls. When they are captured, it is presumably around dawn or dusk from their tree hole, in species such as the widespread 315 g (11.1 oz) red squirrel (Sciurus vulgaris), or burrow entrance, in the case of ground squirrels, most regularly recorded as prey in Asia Minor and the Central Asia. A few specimens of the 2,000 g (4.4 lb) woolly flying squirrels (Eupetaurus cinereus), the largest of the world's flying squirrels and one of the rarest, was the only identified foods for Eurasian eagle-owls in northern Pakistan alongside some European hares. Although uncommon, marmots are known to be taken in some occasions. In Europe, adult-sized alpine marmots, (Marmota marmota) have been killed. However Tarbagan marmots (Marmota sibirica) taken in Mongolia and alpine marmots in Engadin, Switzerland were all juvenile individuals. Other than marmots, the largest rodent known to be hunted by Eurasian eagle-owls is the introduced aquatic rodent, the muskrat (Ondatra zibethica), which in one study estimated to average 1,300 g (2.9 lb) when taken, and the young nutria (Myocastor coypus).

=== Lagomorphs ===
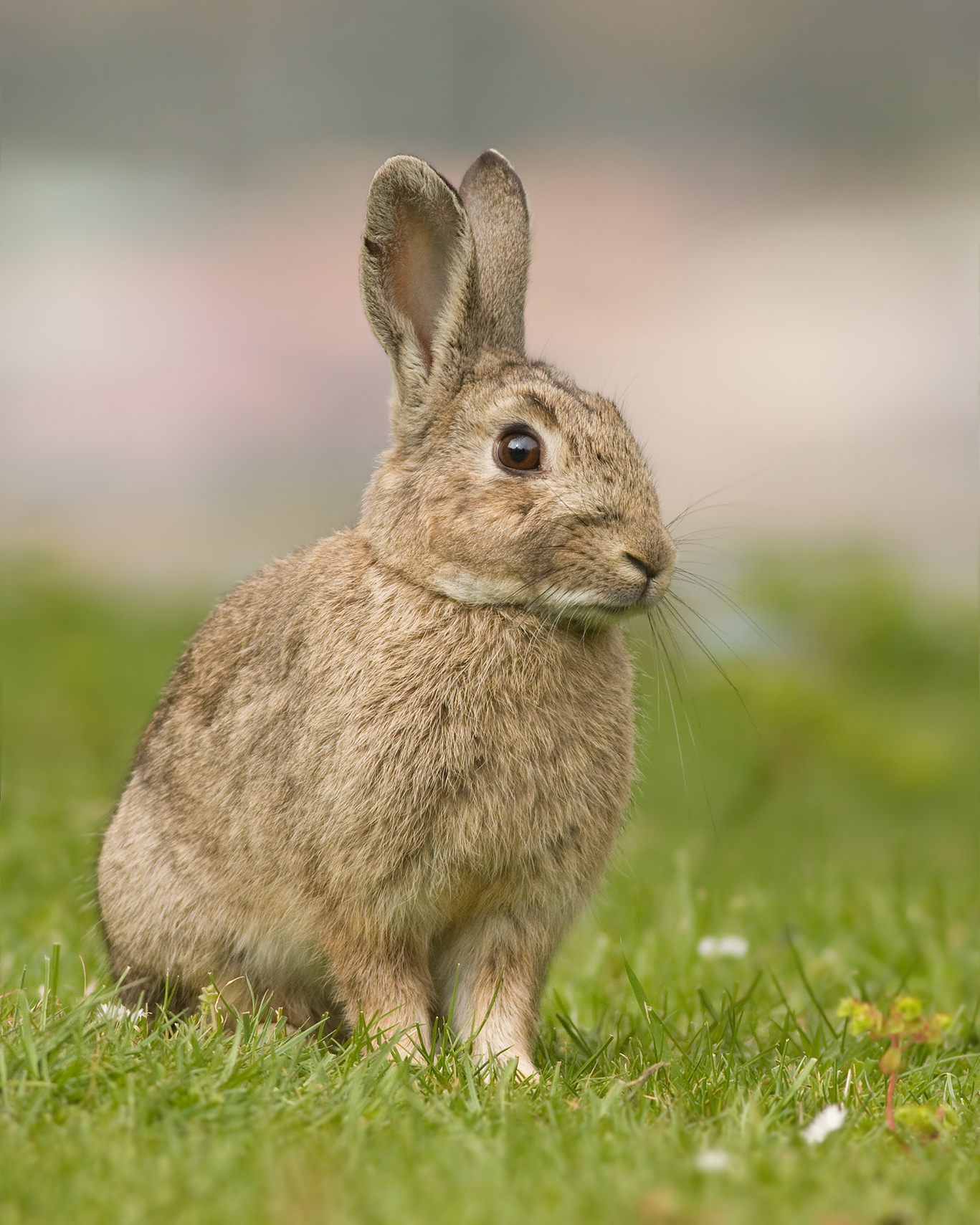
A young European rabbit, the primary food for western European eagle-owls.

Throughout the western Mediterranean region, the Eurasian Eagle-Owl is something of a specialist in a single prey species: the European rabbit. The rabbit historically reached extremely high densities in Iberian scrub, i.e. more than 40 per every 1 square hectare (2.471 square acres). In central Spain, up to 73.1% of the recorded prey for Eurasian eagle-owls, by number, are rabbits. Where still available, they are also the main prey in Portugal and central France. However, following the devastation of the wild rabbit due to rabbit haemorrhagic disease, the local eagle-owls have frequently had to adapt to other, often smaller, prey. On the other hand, given the now much-reduced numbers of rabbits, the eagle-owls still regularly select rabbits, seemingly out of proportion to their commonality. The size of rabbits typically taken can be variable, reported from as little as 800 g (1.8 lb) in a study from Spain to as much as 1,900 g (4.2 lb) in the Netherlands, from juveniles to fully grown individuals. Eagle-owls usually hunt smaller specimens, often with an average weight around 1,000 g (2.2 lb), with young rabbits usually selected in spring and summer and subadults selected in the autumn and winter. This is largely due to the behavior of rabbits, with younger rabbits being forced to distribute following weaning, being less cautious in behavior, and occupying less primary habitat, thus being forced out of the confines of their burrows more regularly than mature adults.

Other lagomorphs extensively overlap in range with Eurasian eagle-owls in Europe are hares. Hares are often considered secondary in prey remains in most European biomes by number but often are a significant contributor to prey biomass for eagle-owls. For example, in Finland, the mountain hare (Lepus timidus) made up only 5.3% of prey by number but made up 56.2% of the prey biomass as the hare specimens were very large, including adults weighing up to around 4,000 g (8.8 lb). On the contrary, the mountain hare was the numerous prey species in one study from the Swiss Alps, making up 28.3% of the prey by number. The European hare was also the second most common prey species in a study from the Czech Republic. In lower Austria, the European hare (Lepus europaeus) was also the second most abundant species in the diet but the estimated average weight of hares taken was rather low, at 850 g (1.87 lb), indicating young hares of probably less than a month old are most often taken there. Similarly, another area near Europe where hares were numerically important was in southwestern Turkey, only young European hares were taken, being the second most common prey species by number. There it consisted of 18.1% of the quantity and presumably a huge portion of the biomass. While juveniles are largely preferred, eagle-owls are capable of killing almost all sizes of European hares including adults around 4,500 to 4,750 g (9.92 to 10.47 lb) in weight.

Outside of southwestern Europe, the next closest association between lagomorphs and this species is in the arid steppe of southern Russia, hares are apparently the primary prey of the local eagle-owls. Little has been published in recent ornithological reviews, but old studies have indicated that the eagle-owls in this region are so dependent on hares, primarily again the mountain hare species, that cyclical reductions in numbers of the hares are followed immediately by a reduction of the local eagle-owls. A similar phenomenon has been noted in the great horned owl in its association with the snowshoe hare in the American boreal forest. The same prey, the mountain hare, was the most important along the Pechora River in Russia, making up 34.1% of prey numbers. However, the general habitat is distinctly different from the steppe, as it consists of mountainous sub-taiga dense forests. Together with sizeable numbers of Eurasian red squirrels and large forest grouse which are the next most significant prey types by number, the mean prey size along the Pechora is presumably extremely large. Although in surrounding arid lowlands the food is almost totally dominated by gerbils, jirds and their kin, in the Pamir Mountains of Tajikistan and Afghanistan, the cape hare (Lepus capensis) was the leading prey species, making up 44% of the prey numbers. In Mongolia, tolai hare (Lepus tolai) around 2,000 g (4.4 lb) were the most significant contributor of prey biomass, making up 30.6% of biomass but only contributed 4% of the prey by number

Other than the prior mentioned species, at least five other species of hare have been found as occasional contributors to the eagle-owl's diet. The only other family in the lagomorph order, the pikas, have been found to factor regularly into the diet of Eurasian eagle-owls as well, mainly in the mountainous regions of Asia. Pikas are much smaller than rabbits and hares, averaging 70 to 185 g (2.5 to 6.5 oz) amongst the know prey species. One study in Mongolia found that Daurian pikas (Ochotona dauurica) made up 73% by a number of the remains. In the Tibetan Plateau, the plateau pika (Ochotona curzoniae) and gansu pika (Ochotona cansus) were the second and third most numerous prey species. The more sizeable large-eared pika (Ochotona macrotis) was the second most regular prey species in the Pamir Mountains, comprising 10.8% of the remains.

=== Other mammals ===
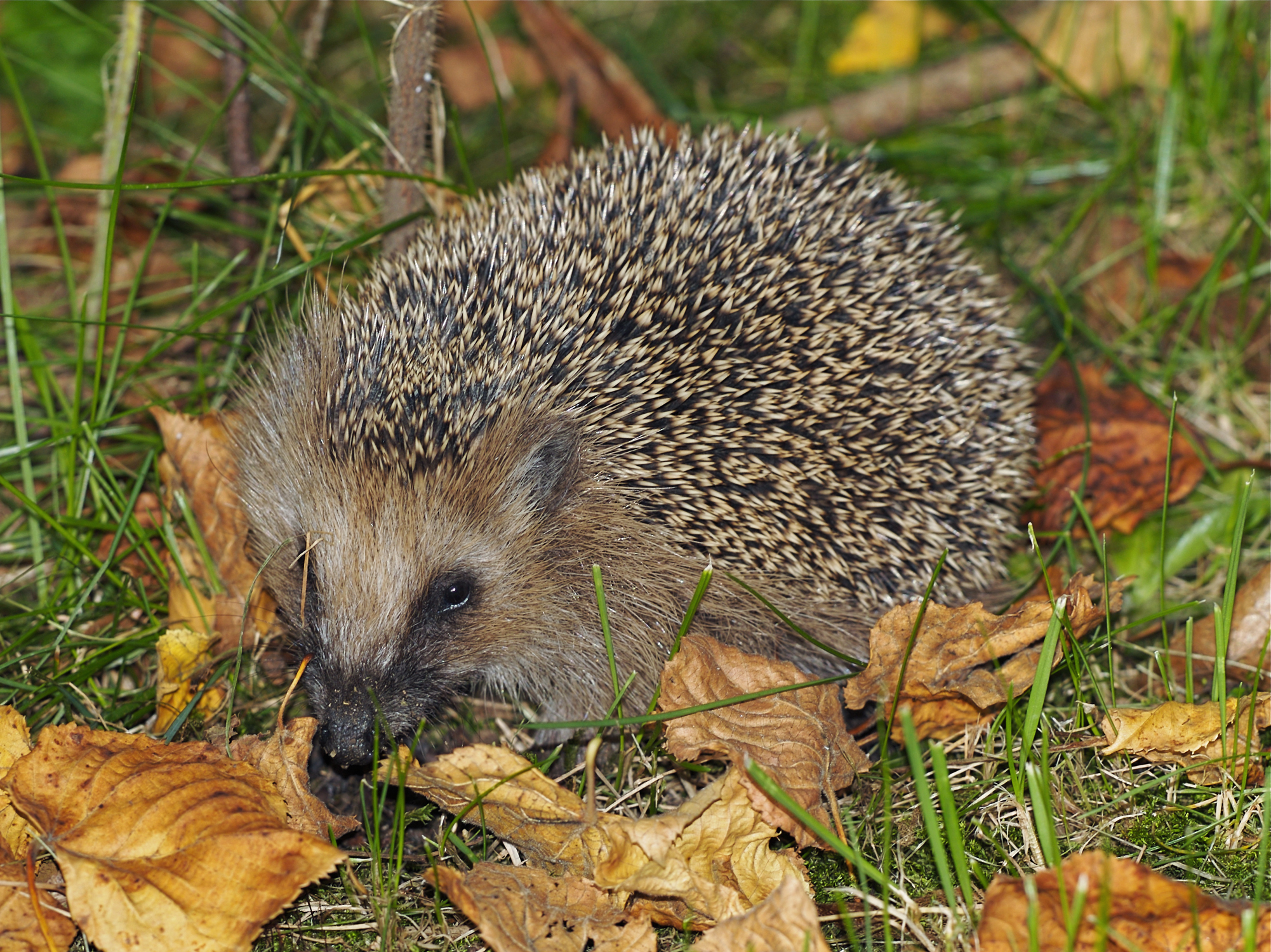
The Eurasian eagle-owl is perhaps the only predator to prefer European hedgehogs as food, as one of the few predators not foiled by its prickly defenses.

Hedgehogs often comprise a fairly significant portion of the prey taken by Eurasian eagle-owls, both in numbers and biomass. At least eight species of hedgehog have been predated. The European hedgehog is often one of the most prominent prey species in eagle-owl diet studies from Europe, and was recorded as the most numerous prey species per researchers in parts of Denmark, Switzerland, Austria and south Germany. With an average weight of 500 to 1,000 g (1.1 to 2.2 lb), the European hedgehog can comprise a very large portion of the biomass. A study of the Bavarian region of Germany, the European hedgehog (the main prey species) made up 41.7% of the prey by number and 52.1% of the biomass, the maximum representation of hedgehogs known in Europe. Other members of the genus Erinaceus are also locally regularly taken, as is the 575 g (1.268 lb) Daurian hedgehog (Mesechinus dauuricus) in Mongolia. Studies from Greece and the Czech Republic found that the northern white-breasted hedgehog (Erinaceus roumanicus) was the leading prey species. Unidentified Erinaceus hedgehogs almost totally dominated the diet of eagle-owls in Stavropol, Russia, making up 70.9% of the food, only the European rabbit has been found as more significant at the genera level by number in a given dietary study. Studies from both Syria and Kazakhstan showed that the 365 g (12.9 oz) long-eared hedgehog (Hemiechinus auritus) was the most significant prey, making up 25.3% and 33.6% of the prey remains, respectively. After killing hedgehogs, the Eurasian eagle-owls peel the prickly skin off their backs before consumption, frequently resulting in up to dozens of hedgehog backs being found around nests. Moles and shrews are readily hunted but are usually only a second portion of the diet. Eurasian eagle-owls have been recorded hunting the smallest mammal on earth (by weight) the 1.8 g (0.063 oz) Etruscan shrew (Suncus etruscus), as well as the largest mole on earth, the 440 g (16 oz) Russian desman (Desmana moschata). From the smallest shrew to the heaviest hedgehog, the Eurasian eagle-owl has been verified to hunt the full size range of insectivores. They've also attacked bats of every size available, from the smallest European bat, the 5.7 g (0.20 oz) common pipistrelle (Pipistrellus pipistrellus), to the largest species there, the 59 g (2.1 oz) greater noctule bat (Nyctalus lasiopterus). In the Sikhote-Alin range of the Russian Far East, bats were found to comprise 5.9% of the remains and, of five local owl species, the Eurasian eagle-owl was the most regular predator of bats in the area.

Larger and more dangerous mammalian prey is not infrequently tackled by Eurasian eagle-owl. Nearly thirty species of mammalian carnivores have been reported in their diet. Many of these are mustelids, mainly weasels such as least weasel (Mustela nivalis), Stoats (Mustela erminea), and Siberian weasel (Mustela sibirica). However, Eurasian eagle-owl seems to have no problem subduing larger mustelids such as polecats (Mustela putorius & M. eversmanii), European minks (Mustela lutreola), and even martens such as sables (Martes zibellina), pine martens (martes martes) and stone martens (martes foina). Non-native American mink (Neogale vision) have also been preyed on by eagle owls. They also pose a threat to the young of much larger species such as European otter (Lutra lutra) and Eurasian badger (Meles meles). The single most widely reported carnivore is the red fox (Vulpes vulpes), as they've been recorded in the diet from Denmark and Spain to the Russian Far East. Nearly all red fox specimens taken by eagle-owls are young individuals or subadults. Some studies posited that the average fox taken by eagle owls weighing about 2,500 to 3,000 g (5.5 to 6.6 lb), about equal to the eagle-owl's own weight. However, larger adult red foxes can be taken on exceptional occasions. Other species of foxes, including Blanford's fox (Vulpes cana), Rüppell's fox (Vulpes rueppellii), and corsac fox (Vulpes corsac) have been verified as prey in the Middle East and Asia. Additionally, common raccoon dogs (Nyctereutes procyonoides) and small or young dogs (Canis familiaris) have been preyed on as well. Predation on felid is uncommon though eagle-owls are known to prey on domestic cats (felis catus) and European wildcats (felis silvestris). Also, there is a report that the eagle owl killed Amur cat (Prionailurus bengalensis euptilura) in Russia. Other relatively large carnivores have been hunted as well, including Egyptian mongoose (Herpestes ichneumon), common genet (Genetta genetta), and possibly civets in China.

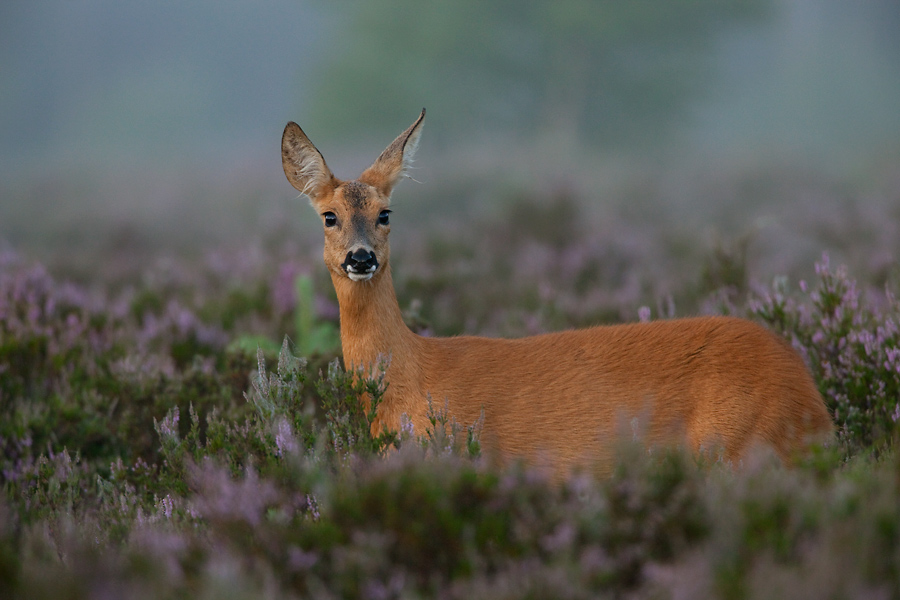
The young roe deer may be the largest prey taken by any living owl.

Though not often, Eurasian eagle owls occasionally kill the young of ungulates, mainly roe deer (Capreolus capreolus) fawns. The size of roe deer fawns taken by eagle owls can vary, from 1,500 g (3.3 lb) to 13,000 g (29 lb) in weight. Small adult-sized roe deer, weighing up to 17,000 g (37 lb) have been recorded as prey, though these specimens have possibly previously been injured or taken as carrion. Eagle-owls also take wild boar (Sus scrofa) piglets and young reindeers (Rangifer tarandus) as prey and possibly pose a threat to young of ibex (Capra ibex) and red deer (Cervus elaphus). They rarely hunt domestic ungulates, though predation on “half-grown”domestic sheep (Ovis aries) has been reported.

=== Birds ===
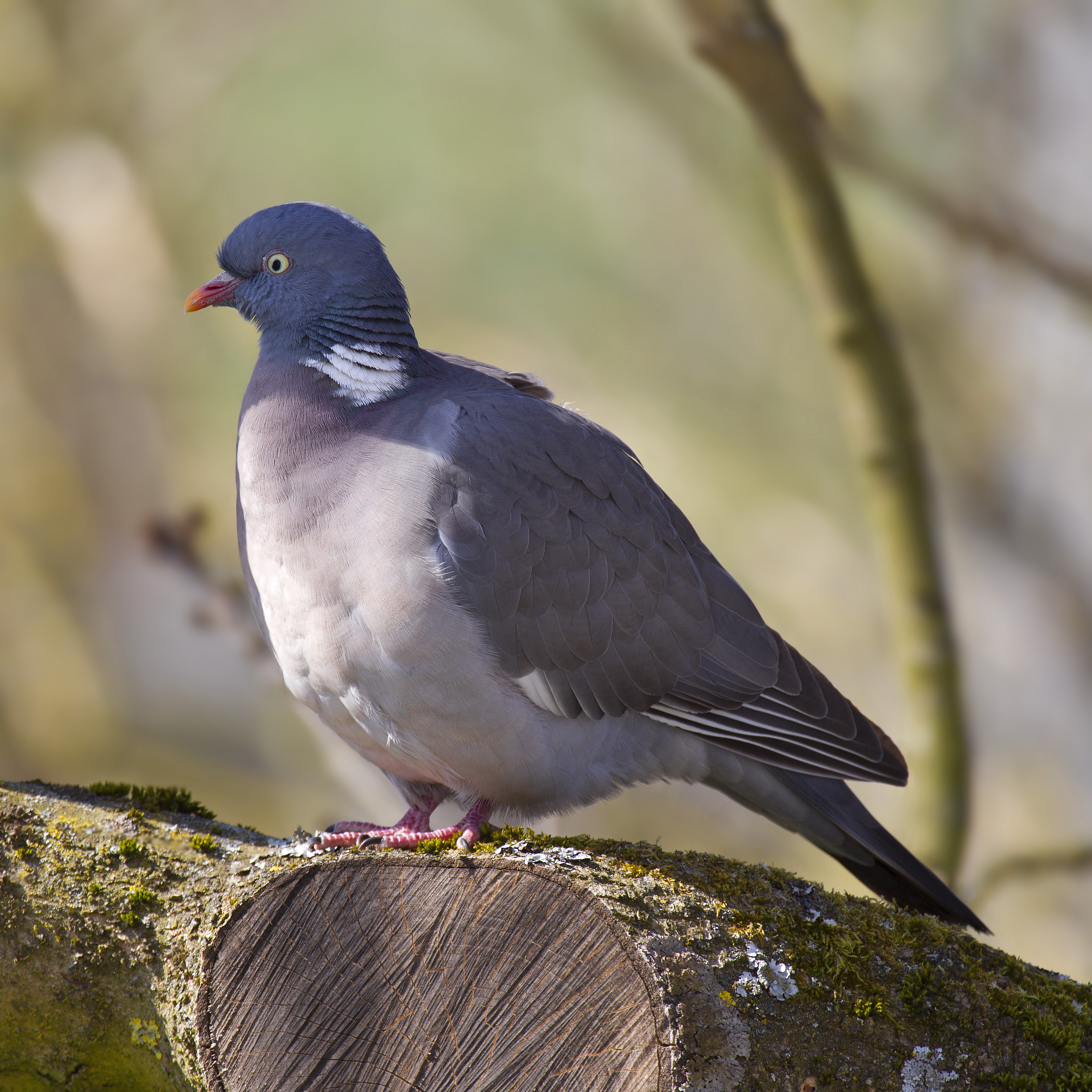
In some areas, common wood pigeon are more important prey for Eurasian eagle-owls than any mammal.

The Eurasian eagle-owl may hunt at least 300 species of bird. In Europe, the most common avian prey species are the normally feral or domestic 355 g (12.5 oz) rock pigeons (Columba livia), although the 490 g (17 oz) common wood pigeon (Columba palumbus) can be locally even more significant. In the Netherlands, the common wood pigeon is the most important prey species, making up 37.3% by number and 38.3% by biomass. Yet another, smaller study of the Netherlands found the rock pigeon to be the primary prey species. In a dietary study from Luxembourg, the common wood pigeon was the most frequent prey species, making 19% of the remains by number. A study from Romania listed the rock pigeon was the second most frequently recorded prey behind only the Romanian hamster and the largest contributed of biomass. Unusually, in the Netherlands, birds were the primary food in both number (77.6%) and biomass (72%). Also, in Luxembourg, eagle-owls hunted birds in general more regularly than mammals, as nearly 70% of prey remains there were avian. At least six other species of pigeon and dove have also been recorded as prey. However, perhaps the most significant contributor of prey at the family level is the corvids and all available species have been targeted. The 570 g (1.26 lb) carrion crow (Corvus corone) is the second most widely recorded avian prey species in Europe and, locally, good numbers are also taken of 490 g (1.08 lb) hooded crow (Corvus cornix), 245 g (8.6 oz) western jackdaws (Corvus monedula), 160 g (5.6 oz) Eurasian jays (Garrulus glandarius), 1,085 g (2.392 lb) common ravens (Corvus corax), 455 g (1.003 lb) rooks (Corvus corone), two species each of magpie and chough and the 183 g (6.5 oz) spotted nutcracker (Nucifraga caryocatactes), in rough descending order of reportage in the eagle-owl's diet. In Baden-Württemberg, Germany, the carrion crow was the most frequently recorded bird among an exceptionally diverse recorded prey base including no less than 65 bird species there (although birds only comprised 27% of the prey numbers overall). Unlike smaller passerines, corvids roost in numbers in relatively open spots, which make them fairly vulnerable to a predator as stealthy and powerful as the eagle-owl. More than 17 species of gamebirds have been recorded in the Eurasian eagle-owl's diet but they are normally taken in small numbers. There are, however, exceptions. In one study conducted in lower Austria, the most frequently identified prey species was the 405 g (14.3 oz) grey partridge (Perdix perdix), which is the most widely reported gamebird prey for eagle-owls in Europe. One study of a “primeval” forested region of Finland found various grouse species to be the most significant contributor of biomass, namely in descending order the 2,950 g (6.50 lb) western capercaillie (Tetrao urogallus), the 1,080 g (2.38 lb) black grouse (Tetrao tetrix) and the 429 g (15.1 oz) hazel grouse (Bonasa bonasia). In inland areas of Norway, the large forest grouse were also significant biomass contributors. The same forest grouse species were also found to be significant to diet along the Pechora River in Russia. Other gamebirds can be important secondary prey species in different parts of Europe: the 528 g (1.164 lb) red-legged partridge (Alectoris rufa) in western Europe, the 615 g (1.356 lb) rock partridge (Alectoris graeca) and the 535 g (1.179 lb) rock ptarmigan (Lagopus mutus) in alpine highlands, the 1,135 g (2.502 lb) ring-necked pheasant (Phasianus colchicus) in eastern Europe and the 570 g (1.26 lb) willow ptarmigan (Lagopus lagopus) in the sub-Arctic zone. In Turkey, the most significant prey by number was the 503 g (1.109 lb) chukar (Alectoris chukar), comprising 20.5% of remains. A Korean study in two habitat types (forest and field) found that ring-necked pheasants were the main prey species, making up an average of 19.33% by number and 34.81% by biomass. Other birds of prey are perhaps second only to pigeons and corvids amongst avian contributors to the diet (their ecological relationships with eagle-owls are explored in more detail below).

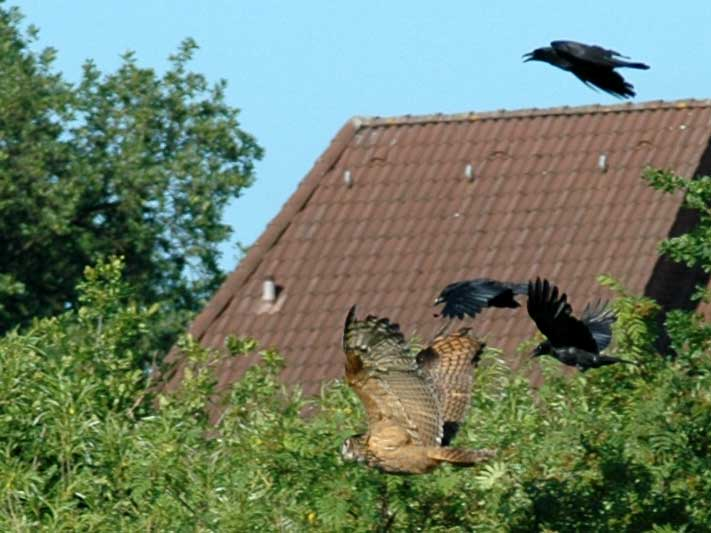
Here, carrion crows mob a Eurasian eagle-owl. It is with good cause as many are taken by night by the eagle-owl.

Among coastal and some wetland areas, various water birds can come to contribute a large portion of both prey numbers and prey biomass. This may include more than 50 species of shorebird (from one of the smallest sandpipers to the largest species of gull), more than 30 species of waterfowl, more than 10 species of herons, more than 8 species of rails and any grebes, cormorants or other water birds that are available. The most regularly reported water bird prey in Europe were, roughly in this order, the 343 g (12.1 oz) common moorhens (Gallinula chloropus), the 836 g (1.843 lb) Eurasian coot (Fulica atra), 1,140 g (2.51 lb) mallards (Anas platyrhynchos), 284 g (10.0 oz) black-headed gull (Chroicocephalus ridibundus), and the 340 g (12 oz) Eurasian teal (Anas crecca). The diet of a handful of eagle-owl pairs in the Riau Islands Province of France were found to be dominated by water birds, especially the 1,154 g (2.544 lb) yellow-legged gull (Larus michahellis), the colonial abundance of which allowed the eagle-owls to atypically occupy these small islands. The diet of eagle-owls in Norway was dominated in coastal areas by water birds, overall for the nation 53% of the food was made of birds, the species most commonly identified as caught being the 388 g (13.7 oz) common gull (Larus canus), 430 g (15 oz) common puffin (Fratercula arctica) and 2,070 g (4.56 lb) common eider (Somateria mollissima). Despite access to large seabird breeding colonies, almost all large bird species hunted in Norway, including large forest grouse in more inland areas, were apparently fully-grown adults and most water birds were caught while resting on open coastal waters. Eagle-owls in northwestern Poland, an area heavily dotted with lakes, relied on birds for about 64% of the diet, more than half of which were water birds. The main prey species there was the Eurasian coot, at nearly 15% of the prey numbers. In Primorsky Krai in Russia, 53.2% of the food for the eagle-owls were made up of birds, predominantly water birds with the primary prey species being the 260 g (9.2 oz) crested auklet (Aethia cristatella) (26.9%). In the Russian Far East, similarly, birds occupy up to 57.6% of the diet, a lion's share of which are water birds. In this study, the grey red-backed vole and reed vole (Microtus fortis) were the most numerous identified individual species but in some years the extremely large Japanese cormorant (Phalacrocorax capillatus), at 2,820 g (6.22 lb), were more numerous as prey than either vole. Water birds were found to be even more important in the diet in Korea, as in wetland habitat, with birds in general comprising 68.9% by number and 85.3% by biomass there, but in adjacent upland areas birds were slightly secondary to mammals, which made up 38.7% by number and 64.7% by biomass, led by the brown rat. In Korea, the mallard and the similar eastern spot-billed duck (Anas poecilorhyncha) made up 38.1% of the biomass. Other recorded bird species in the Eurasian eagle-owl's diet includes all type of birds found in their range, including bustards, sandgrouse, parrots, cuckoos, swifts, the 67 g (2.4 oz) hoopoe (Upupa epops), the 56.5 g (1.99 oz) European bee-eater (Merops apiaster), the 31 g (1.1 oz) common kingfisher (Alcedo atthis), the 146 g (5.1 oz) European roller (Coracias garrulus), at least seven species of woodpecker (from the smallest to the largest European species) and more than 80 species of passerine. Among passerines, the only family reported widely as prey besides corvids are thrushes. In the Italian Alps, Turdus species were the fourth most frequently recorded type of prey. In particular, the abundant 103 g (3.6 oz) Eurasian blackbird (Turdus merula) is widely reported to be taken by eagle-owls. As thrushes are relatively small, at 55 to 130 g (1.9 to 4.6 oz) among the species known to be predated, pairs in the Italian Alps who depended more so on thrushes usually showed lower productivity during nesting attempts.

Wild birds found in their diet have ranged in size from the 9.5 g (0.34 oz) Eurasian wren (Troglodytes troglodytes) to about 15 species weighing over 2,000 g (4.4 lb). Several species of geeses are occasionally preyed upon, including greater white-fronted goose (Anser albifrons), bar-headed goose (Anser indicus). Larger geese such as 3,500 g (7.7 lb) greylag goose (Anser anser) and the 3,400 g (7.5 lb) bean goose (Anser fabalis) are also known to be taken. Large galliforms birds are also taken, such as Himalayan snowcock (Tetraogallus himalayensis) weighing around 2,500 g (5.5 lb), and western capercaillie, including adult males around 4,100 g (9.0 lb) in weight. Wading birds as large as adult grey herons (Ardea cinerea) and greater flamingos (Phoenicopterus roseus) which weighs around 1,566 g (3.452 lb) and 3,579 g (7.890 lb) respectively, can be taken. Other large species have been hunted include demoiselle crane (Anthropoides virgo), common crane (Grus grus), and great bustard (Otis tarda), though the age or circumstance of these birds taken is unknown. Although they usually do not take domestic birds, birds raging size from budgerigars (Melopsittacus undulatus), weighing only 29 g (1.0 oz), to domestic turkeys and Chinese geese can be taken.

=== Other prey ===
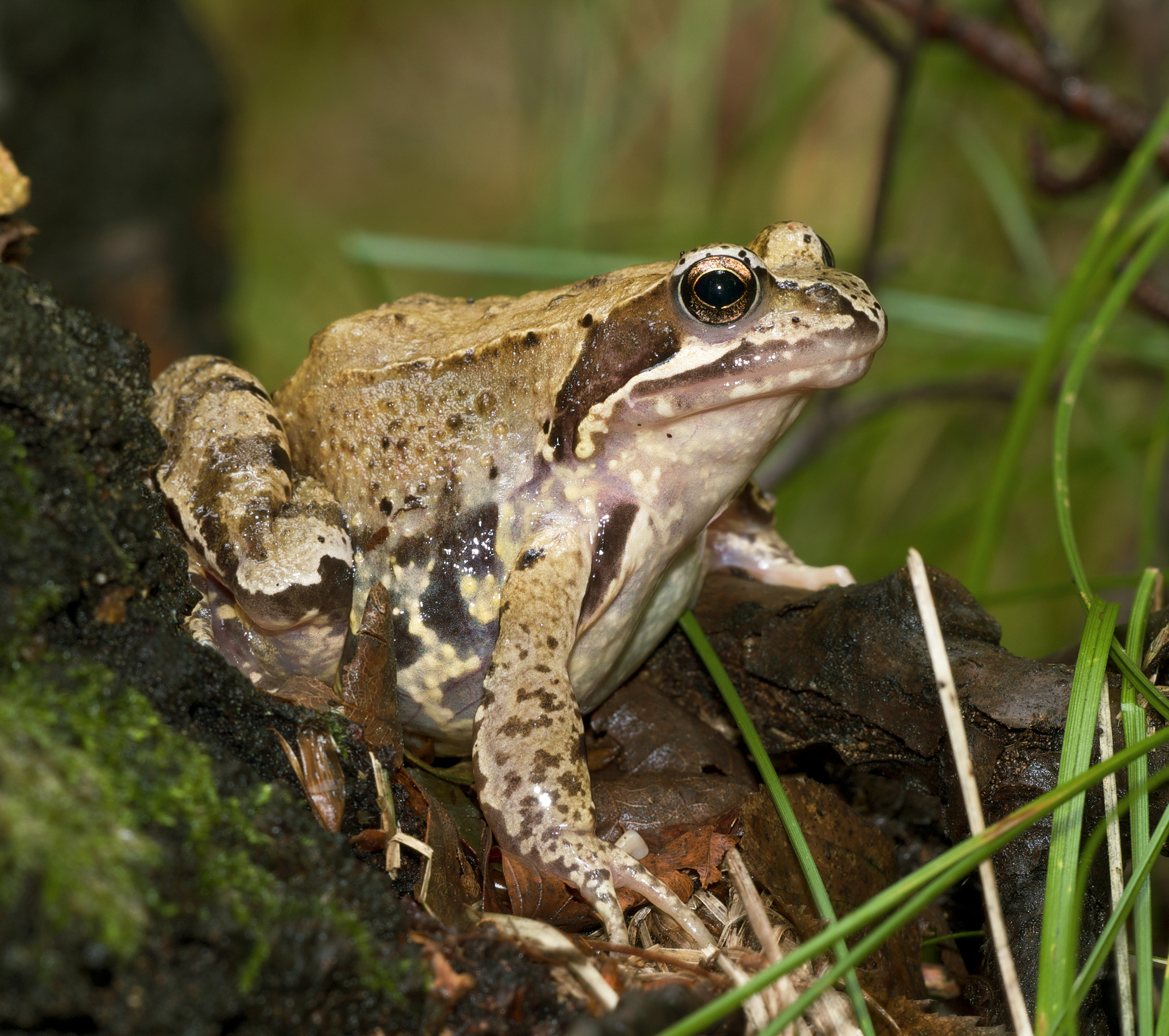
The common frog, perhaps the only amphibian taken in large numbers by Eurasian eagle-owls.

Reptiles and amphibians are only an occasionally contributor to the diet in many regions. Most of the 30 or so species recorded have been taken as supplemental prey in Spain, i.e. several lizards (including geckos), frogs and toads, snakes and, to a lesser degree, turtles. One species widely and commonly reported in Europe outside of the Iberian region is the 23 g (0.81 oz) common frog (Rana temporaria). It was the leading prey, making up 45% of the prey found at nests in Rogaland, Norway. Also, the common frog was the second most abundant prey species in studies from southern Sweden, Valais and Engadin in Switzerland, Verbano-Cusi-Ossola, Italy and an enormous study from Slovakia, in the latter 10,476 frogs recorded making up 28.2% of the prey. Eagle owls are known to hunt various snakes. Small snakes about 50 to 70 cm (20 to 28 in) in length, such as adult viperine snakes (Natrix maura), southern smooth snakes (Coronella girondica) and subadult ladder snakes (Zamenis scalaris) are known to be taken, while snakes as large as Colubridae snakes around 130 cm (51 in) can be preyed upon. Like the golden eagle, the eagle-owl may attack spur-thighed tortoises (Testudo graeca). In Lebanon, a “large adult” tortoise, which would be at least as heavy as the eagle-owl itself, was among their food items, although how they handle and eat this large, hard-shelled prey is not clear. Eurasian eagle-owls also opportunistically prey on fish, although never in large numbers, as fish are likely to be taken while encountered incidentally during hunts for other prey such as water birds. This species is known to take a greater diversity of fish (more than 30 species verified) and is more widely reported to hunt them than the great horned owl. Most of the fish recorded are medium-sized, with at least 10 each of various kinds of carp or cod, but several species averaging more than 2,000 g (4.4 lb) in mature mass have been taken, including common barbell (Barbus barbus), common carp (Cyprinus carpio), northern pike (Esox lucius) and a few species of trout, even bigger marine predators like the anglerfish (Lophius piscatorius) and European conger (Conger conger). However, in many cases small, young specimens may be caught of these large fish species rather than full-grown adults. Several species of insect and invertebrate have been identified in eagle-owl pellets. In some cases, these may be undigested insects in the stomachs of birds eaten by the eagle-owl but Eurasian eagle-owls have been verified as actively hunting insects and aquatic invertebrates such as snails and crabs before, as well as earthworms. Especially diverse in the diet are ground-based beetles, at least 20 species have been identified mainly those in the Carabus (ground beetle) genus.

== Interspecies predatory relationships ==
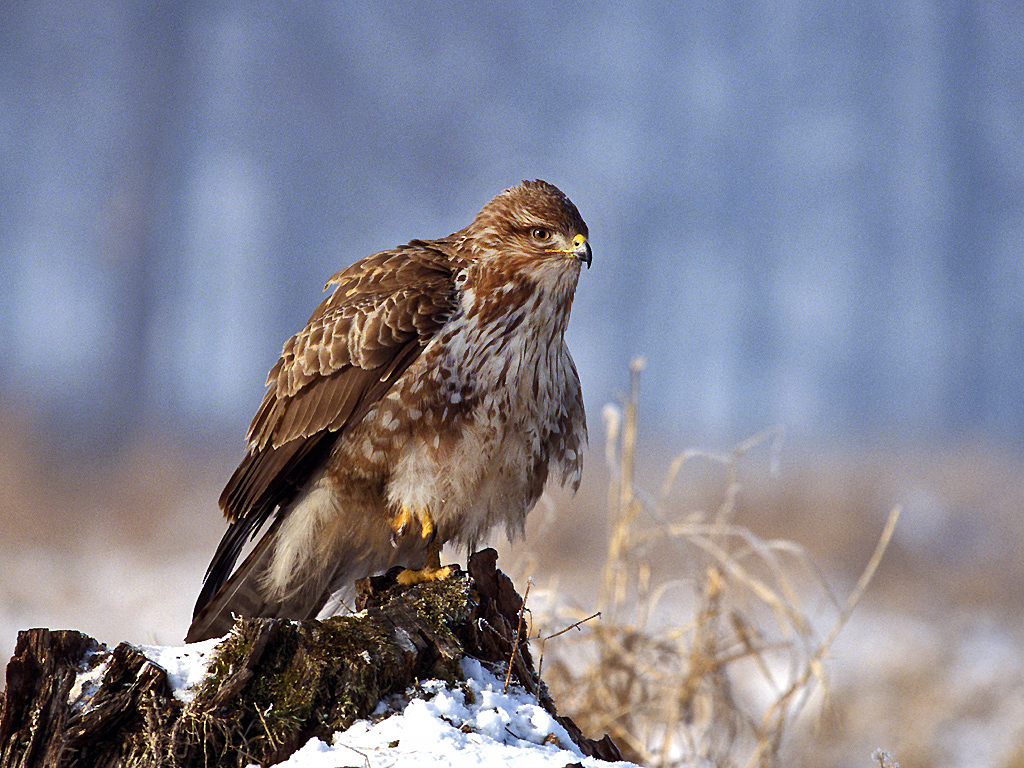
The common buzzard, although near the top of the avian food chain, is often a victim to predation by Eurasian eagle-owl.

The Eurasian eagle-owl is a very formidable bird of prey but its diet broadly overlaps with other European owls. All species of owl in the European and northern Asian regions hunt rodents, as does the eagle-owl, and in many the very same microtine rodents such as voles and lemmings will be favored. Even the 58.5 g (2.06 oz) Eurasian pygmy owl (Glaucidium passerinum), at a whooping one-fortieth of the weight of an eagle-owl, will take much the same rodent prey as eagle-owls in adjacent habitats. The only European owls to favor non-rodent prey are the 92 g (3.2 oz) European scops owl (Otus scops) and 169 g (6.0 oz) little owl (Athene noctua), both of which most regularly consume invertebrates. However, little owls also take rodents and small mammals, especially in the winter months (while scops owl migrate to Africa for the winter). The European owls with the most similar diets to eagle-owls are 475 g (1.047 lb) tawny (Strix aluco) and 785 g (1.731 lb) Ural owls (Strix uralensis), although both are considerably smaller and less powerful and more specialized to hunt in wooded environments. These two Strix species are highly territorial and sedentary like the eagle-owl and capable of taking a broad range of prey, including good numbers of birds and larger prey such as rabbits (for the tawny owl) and hares (for the Ural owl) of up to at least twice their own weight. Studies have indicated that even while selected similar prey species as the eagle-owl, smaller owls including the long-eared, tawny and Ural owls select smaller individual prey items, being more likely to take small, juveniles rather than optimal, large adults as does the eagle-owl. Similar rodent prey is also often taken by many diurnal birds of prey, especially buzzards, harriers, eagles such as spotted eagles and small falcons. However, due its greater size and power than overlapping owls and smaller diurnal raptors, it generally takes more diverse and larger prey than most overlapping raptorial birds.

In the Iberian Peninsula, the Eurasian eagle-owl is part of a complex guild of predators that have evolved to survive mostly on European rabbits. Among this guild, golden eagles (Aquila chrysaetos) were recorded per one study to rely on rabbits for 40% of the diet, the eagle-owl for 49% of the diet, the Spanish imperial eagle (Aquila adalberti) for 50% of the diet, the Bonelli's eagle (Aquila fasciata) for 61% of the diet and the Iberian lynx (Lynx pardinus) for 79% of the diet. Elsewhere, the Spanish imperial eagle and eagle-owl are considered to outflank the golden and even the Bonelli's eagle as the most specialized avian predator of rabbits in the Iberian region. Other predators, such as common buzzard (Buteo buteo), Eurasian goshawk (Accipiter gentilis) black kite (Milvus migrans) Iberian wildcat (Felis silvestris tartessia), red fox, stone marten (Martes foina) and introduced Egyptian mongoose also prey heavily on rabbits in Spain, but are more generalized and less reliant than the above predators. All these powerful predators do not generally compete directly for food but conflicts may ensue over the rights to territories and nesting sites amongst the birds. Being nocturnal in activity, however, the Eurasian eagle-owl does not tend to compete as directly as do the three eagle species and even these are discreetly segregated by habitat preferences, the goldens preferring open, steep cliffs, the Bonelli's favoring densely vegetated areas mixed with rocky spots and the imperial favoring relatively flat open woodlands. Among these eagles, the golden eagle tends to have the most similar habitat preferences to the Eurasian eagle-owl and across a broad band of overlapping distribution, the two are considered nearly ecological equivalents by day and night. However, good-sized female golden eagles are up to twice as heavy as an average eagle-owl, so seem to have a considerable advantage in size and power. Conversely, to support their large size and large territory needs, the golden eagle cannot survive on small and diverse prey nearly as successfully as the eagle-owl. Among the Iberian peninsula rabbit-eating guild, the species with wider ranges, the eagle-owl and the golden and Bonelli's eagles, have had some degree of success living off of alternate prey following the devastation of the rabbit population due to rabbit haemorrhagic disease. The two rabbit predators endemic to Iberia, the Iberian lynx and Spanish imperial eagle, have been devastated by the reduction and other causes and both are threatened species today.

Equally or even more so than the great horned owl, the Eurasian eagle-owl is a threat to any smaller type of raptor it encounters, whether other owls or diurnal birds of prey. All told, more than 20 species of accipitrid, 15 species of owl, and 9 species of falcon have been found amongst their prey. The Eurasian eagle-owl is the primary predator of other birds of prey throughout Eurasia, not even the prolific raptor-killing Eurasian goshawk (Accipiter gentilis) equals the sheer number of raptors taken. Up to 6% of the overall food by number and 36% by prey biomass for Eurasian eagle-owls can be comprised by other raptorial birds. The primary raptorial prey taken by Eurasian eagle-owls in Europe are two species: the 300 g (11 oz) long-eared owl and the 776 g (1.711 lb) common buzzard. Both are taken in such large numbers that they rank in the top five most regularly hunted bird species in Europe. In Luxembourg, the long-eared owl and common buzzard were the fourth and fifth most regularly hunted prey species. Other high rankings have included the long-eared owl being the fourth most regular prey species in Bavaria and the buzzard being the third most regular prey species in a study from the Czech Republic. While migrating, long-eared owls appear to select areas to move through partially based on whether or not eagle-owls are detected, thus eagle-owls have a very serious influence on the behavior of this prey. Despite the large numbers taken of both of these, the more scarce eagle-owl does not seem to have a serious deleterious effect on their overall population, especially compared to anthropogenic factors.

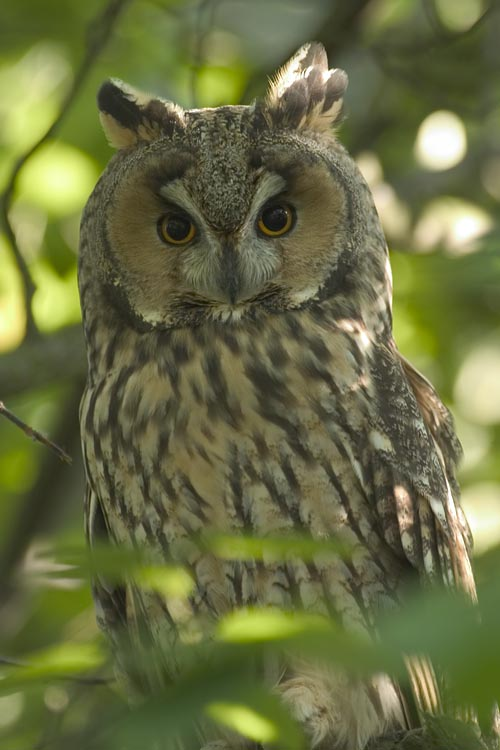
The long-eared owl is the most regularly taken as prey of any raptorial bird by Eurasian eagle-owls.

Other than these two species, a large share of the raptorial prey for eagle-owls is made up of other owls. Given that all European owls are to some extent nocturnal, they may be encountered and killed upon detection by the Eurasian eagle-owl. In Europe, it has killed every other species of owl, from the tiny pygmy owl and scops owl to the large 1,078 g (2.377 lb) great grey owl and the 2,040 g (4.50 lb) snowy owl. The Eurasian eagle-owl is the only raptor that has been known to prey on snowy owl on multiple occasions. However, the threat Eurasian eagle-owls poses to other raptors can be exaggerated. Occasionally, with adequate mammal prey populations, they can nest as close as a few dozen meters of other raptors and never harass them. When nesting in the same groves as the 1,175 g (2.590 lb) long-legged buzzards (Buteo rufinus) in southeastern Bulgaria, Eurasian eagle-owls did not predate the buzzards at any point. Long-legged buzzards have been killed however in Kazakhstan. Even in those occasional cases where they pick off one or several raptors, they do not effect the overall population, unless the raptorial prey is already heavily diminished due to some other (often human-based) cause. For example, despite both being a known predator of both, they did not significantly depress numbers of either Eurasian goshawks or tawny owls in southern Finland. One study showed that many raptors engage in spatial avoidance during potential encounters with Eurasian eagle-owls and while the predation by eagle-owls did decrease raptor population densities, they seldom caused declines in breeding success or altered habitat occupancy.

Discreet habitat preferences may coincidentally spare many owls, as owls from the genera Strix, Glaucidium, Aegolius and the 320 g (11 oz) northern hawk-owl (Surnia ulula) tend to restrict both nesting and their hunting forays to more enclosed areas of woodland than habitats inhabited by the eagle-owls. Meanwhile, Asio, Otus, Athene and barn owls owls tend to hunt in more open habitats than the edges favored by eagle-owls. However, habitat preferences are never enough to spare any of these genera from predation by the great eagle-owl. In the Italian Alps, despite differing habitat preferences and partially overlapping prey, several tawny owls were killed by eagle-owls. Woodland nesting owl species tend to nest in tree hollows, many of which are too small for an eagle-owl to access, so are somewhat less likely to be picked off at their nests. Open-country owls that tend to nest in open-access nesting sites like short-eared owls and little owls may be somewhat more vulnerable at the nest. The great numbers of long-eared owls taken, since it often nest in dense, protective thickets, are probably adult or immature owls attempting to hunt. In Europe, Eurasian eagle-owls are generally the only owls to regularly nest in rocky habitats. This is not the case in arid desert-like regions, where limited nesting options frequently force diverse owls to use rocky areas as nesting sites. However, the cliffs and other rocky areas preferred by Eurasian eagle-owls are also utilized by several species of diurnal raptor in Eurasia. In Spain, golden eagles, Bonelli's eagles and peregrine falcons (Falco peregrinus) most often nest on cliffs. Large scavenging birds such as cinereous vultures (Aegypius monachus), bearded vultures (Gypaetus barbatus), Eurasian griffons (Gyps fulvus), Egyptian vulture (Neophron percnopterus) and common ravens also often nests on the same Iberian cliffs. While the two eagles nested at great distances from one another (they are known to be territorial towards each other), the eagle-owl nesting within 2 to 3 km (1.2 to 1.9 mi) of the other species. In these cliff nests, the only considerable predatory interaction was the eagle-owls appearing to predate the peregrine falcons. In the Tibetan Plateau, upland buzzards (Buteo hemilasius) also seem to favor similar habitats and both the eagle-owl and buzzard take similar prey there. In general, the eagle-owl can nest closer to diurnal raptors because, as a nocturnal animal, it will not actively compete for territories as it would with other members of its species.

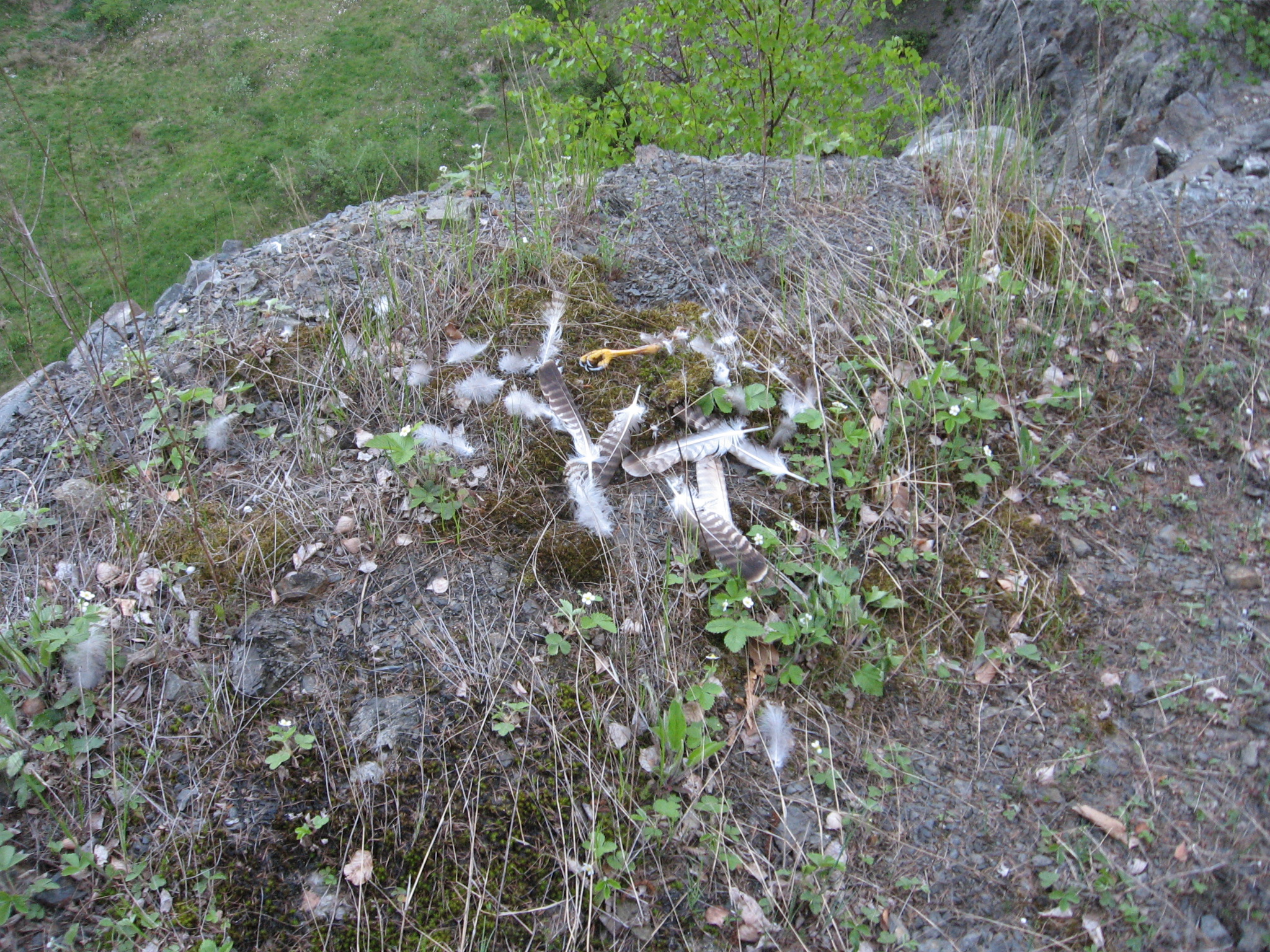
The remains of a common buzzard that was preyed on by a Eurasian eagle-owl.

While owls are often killed by Eurasian eagle-owls while actively hunting, diurnal raptors are often ambushed at night at their large, conspicuous nests since they are easily located during hunting forays and the raptors are nearly defenseless in nocturnal conditions. The Eurasian eagle-owl predates the largest members of the most species-rich diurnal raptor genera: the 900 g (2.0 lb) Eurasian goshawks from the genus Astur, the 1,375 g (3.031 lb) upland buzzards from the genus Buteo, and the 1,460 g (3.22 lb) gyrfalcons (F. rusticolus) of the genus Falco. Some of these are cases of eagle-owls killing nestlings or fledglings but they can easily overtake adult buzzards, goshawks and falcons of any size. The eagle-owl has also been specified as the primary predator of smaller species, such as common buzzards, peregrine falcons, common kestrel (Falco tinnunculus) and black kites. Studies have shown that 743 g (1.638 lb) peregrine falcon experience lower productivity in areas where they nest close to eagle-owls, as the eagle-owls pick off both nestlings and adults by night. However, peregrine populations were not hugely affected except in cases where small reintroductions were attempted of falcons or falcon populations were already rare due to other causes.

Additional large raptors, i.e. those that can average 1,000 g (2.2 lb) or more in body mass, taken as prey include the 1,080 g (2.38 lb) red kites (Milvus milvus) from the genus Milvus, and the rough-legged buzzards (Buteo lagopus) and saker falcons (Falco cherrug), in both of which females average more than 1,000 g (2.2 lb). The taking of rough-legged buzzards and snowy owls must be confined to full-grown victims, since they nest further north than Eurasian eagle-owls. Though uncommon, eagle-owls can prey on even larger raptors, such as osprey (Pandion haliaetus), lesser spotted eagle (Clanga pomarina), short-toed eagles (Circaetus gallicus), and Egyptian vulture (Neophron percnopterus). Even fledgling of Bonelli's eagles (Aquila fasciata) and nestling of white-tailed eagles (Haliaeetus albicilla) are known to be preyed upon. Additionally Eurasian eagle-owls also hunt the smallest raptors available, including those such as lesser kestrels (Falco naumanni) and Japanese sparrowhawks (Accipiter gularis) that weigh less than 150 g (5.3 oz).

=== Predation ===
In rare cases, other predators may kill a Eurasian eagle-owl. In Europe, there is one case of a white-tailed eagle killing an eagle-owl and there are at least four known incidents of eagle-owls being killed by golden eagles. Also, an eagle-owl was found among the prey remains at a golden eagle eyrie in Mongolia. A study in northern Norway found that during the summer while there was nearly no nightfall that eagle-owls appeared to strongly avoid the activities of white-tailed eagles. Data from Altai Krai, Russia and Kazakhstan indicates that steppe eagles (Aquila nipalensis) are occasional predators of eagle-owls as well, based on the eagle's prey remains. In 2016, a large female subadult Bonelli's eagle (Aquila fasciata) apparently preyed upon a three-year-old male Eurasian eagle-owl in Spain. Reportedly, in another case of interspecies predation, a mountain hawk-eagle (Nisaetus nipalensis) killed an eagle-owl in the Himalayas. Pine martens (Martes martes) and stone martens (Martes foina) are opportunistic nest predators. Although martens could probably reach most eagle-owl nests due to their agility and climbing abilities, they probably will attack nests when disturbance or low food supply result in lower nest attendance by the parent owls. Cases where nests have atypically been accessible on foot (for both humans and wild predators) have resulted in Eurasian eagle-owl nests being predated. Eurasian badgers, wild boars and raccoon dogs and raccoons, the latter two both where non-native in Germany, have also reportedly preyed on nests that they can access. In coastal areas of Spain, red foxes were reported to have preyed on four eagle-owls, including one unsexed brooding adult, at nests found to be reachable on foot by researchers. Cases of red foxes killing Eurasian eagle-owls at nests have reported elsewhere albeit very rarely, normally the eagle-owl is a greater danger to the foxes (and many of its other nest predators) than vice versa. In May 2017, a red fox was filmed killing two chicks and raiding the larder of an eagle-owl in Denmark.
