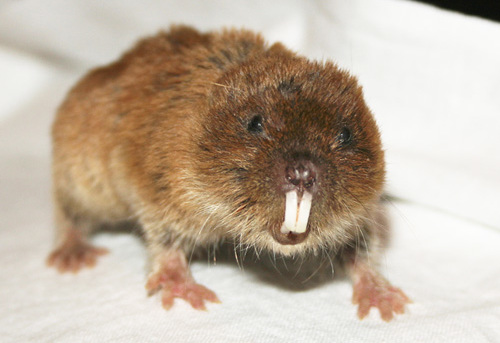
- Northern mole vole (Ellobius talpinus)

Scientific classification
- Domain: Eukaryota
- Kingdom: Animalia
- Phylum: Chordata
- Class: Mammalia
- Order: Rodentia
- Family: Cricetidae
- Subfamily: Arvicolinae
- Tribe: Ellobiusini; Gill, 1872
- Genus: Ellobius; Fischer, 1814

Type species
- Mus talpinus Pallas, 1770

Species
- Ellobius alaicus Ellobius talpinus Ellobius tancrei

= Ellobius =

Ellobius Temporal range: Late Pliocene to Recent

Genus of rodents

Ellobius is a genus of rodents in the family Cricetidae. It contains two (E. talpinus and E. tancrei) of the handful of examples of mammal species that have lost the Y chromosome.

The genus has the following species:

- Alai mole vole (Ellobius alaicus)
- Northern mole vole (Ellobius talpinus)
- Zaisan mole vole (Ellobius tancrei)

Two members of this genus were moved to the genus Bramus:

- Southern mole vole (Bramus fuscocapillus)
- Transcaucasian mole vole (Bramus lutescens)

== See also ==
- Tokudaia another mammal genus that has lost the Y-chromosome
