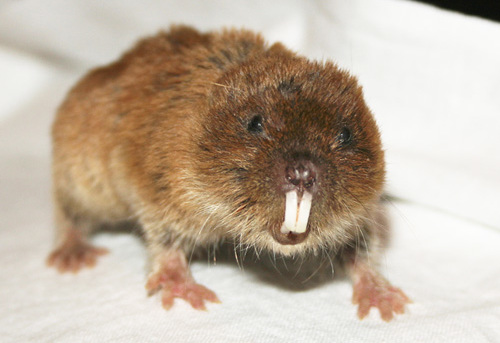

Conservation status
- Least Concern (IUCN 3.1)

Scientific classification
- Kingdom: Animalia
- Phylum: Chordata
- Class: Mammalia
- Order: Rodentia
- Family: Cricetidae
- Subfamily: Arvicolinae
- Genus: Ellobius
- Species: E. talpinus

Binomial name
- Ellobius talpinus (Pallas, 1770)

Synonyms
- E. ciscaucasicus Sviridenko, 1936; E. murinus Pallas, 1770; E. rufescens Eversmann, 1850; E. tanaiticus Zubko, 1940; E. transcaspiae Thomas, 1912; Mus talpinus, Pallas; Spalax murinus, Pallas; Georychus rufescens, Eversmann

= Northern mole vole =

Species of rodent

The northern mole vole (Ellobius talpinus) is a species of rodent in the family Cricetidae. It is distributed over large parts of Eastern Europe and Asia.

== Distribution ==
This vole is found in Kazakhstan, Turkmenistan, Kyrgyzstan, Uzbekistan and Ukraine, the southern parts of Russia, western Siberia, northern Afghanistan, Mongolia and northern China.

== Morphology ==
The northern mole vole is a small mammal about 130 mm (5.1 in) long with a short tail, weighing up to 70 g. The females are slightly larger than the males. The body is wedge-shaped, the head flat, the neck short and the musculature of the forelimbs strongly developed. It has short, dense, brownish fur somewhat paler on the underparts. The feet are naked and pink. It is adapted to life underground, digging its burrows with the help of its large incisors.

== Chromosomes ==
The karyotype has 2n = 54. The Y chromosome is absent, males and females both possess two X chromosomes per set as in the case of its relative E. tancrei (whereas for E. lutescens both sexes only have 1 X per set).

== Biology ==
The northern mole vole is diurnal and active all day. Activity decreases during periods of drought and in the winter, but there is no true hibernation period. A study undertaken in 2001 found the vole's adaptation to the extremes of the continental climate is based on distinct seasonal variations of thermoregulation. The gestation period lasts three weeks, with three or four litters a year, with two to four young voles in each. These grow rapidly and are sexually mature at the age of six weeks.

== Ecology ==
This vole is a colonial species, living in groups of about 10 individuals, typically a family group of one pair of adults and young animals from one or two litters. The burrows are complex, the entrances are usually sealed by soil and the nesting chambers and fodder chambers are usually about 4 m (13 ft) beneath the surface. The animals feed on roots, bulbs, tubers and the juicy rhizomes of plants, and in the summer and autumn they store small stocks of food. They seldom emerge onto the surface except to distribute soil excavated from the burrow or to move to new territories, at which times they can cover distances of up to 800 m (2,600 ft). The population size varies, being limited by infectious diseases, parasites, severe winters with deep-frozen ground, spring flooding of burrows by melt water and predatory birds and mammals.
