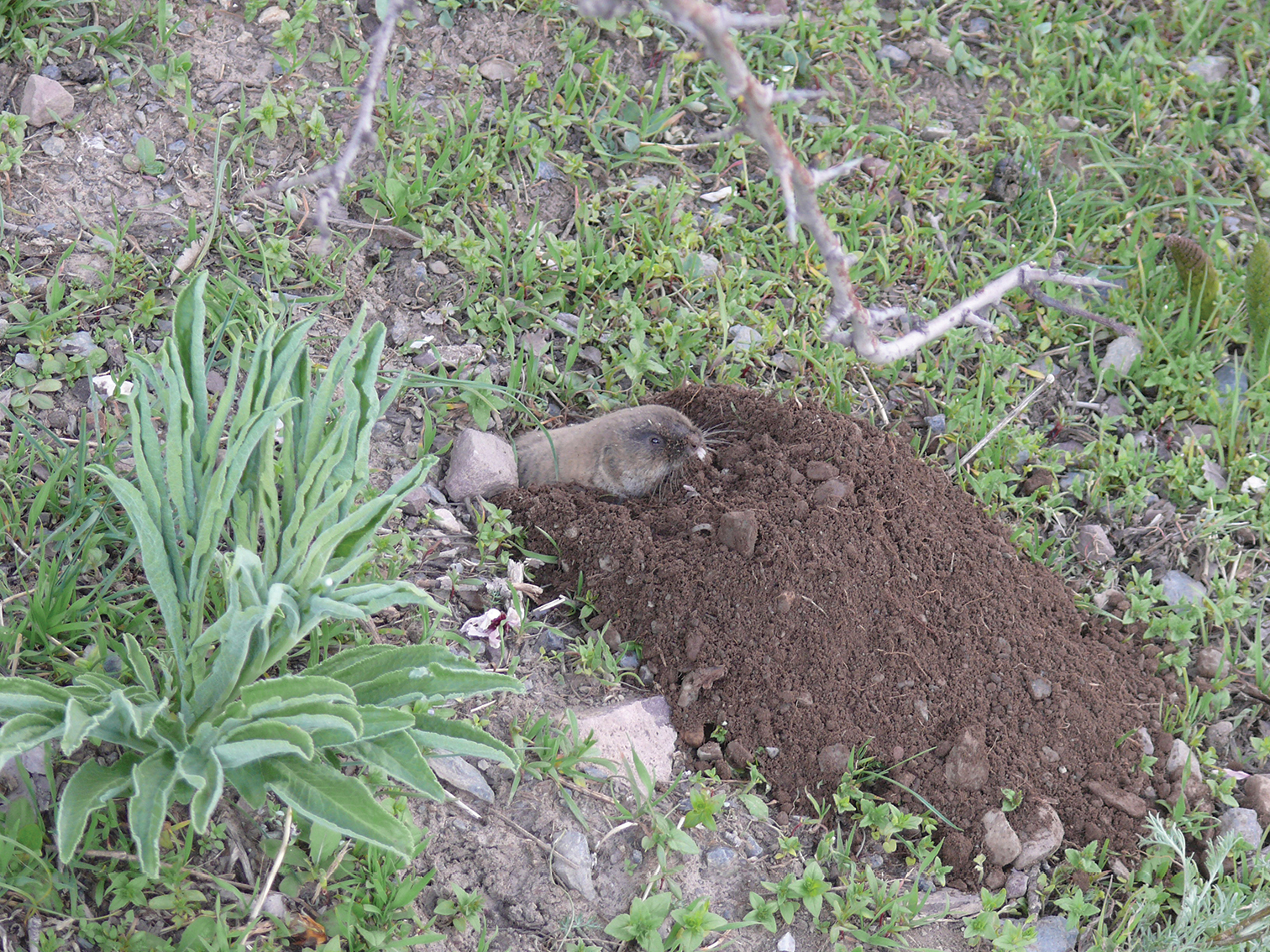

Conservation status
- Data Deficient (IUCN 3.1)

Scientific classification
- Kingdom: Animalia
- Phylum: Chordata
- Class: Mammalia
- Infraclass: Placentalia
- Order: Rodentia
- Family: Cricetidae
- Subfamily: Arvicolinae
- Genus: Ellobius
- Species: E. alaicus

Binomial name
- Ellobius alaicus Vorontsov, Lyapunova, Zakarjan, & Ivanov, 1969

= Alai mole vole =

Species of rodent

The Alai mole vole (Ellobius alaicus) is a species of rodent in the family Cricetidae. It is known only from Kyrgyzstan, where it has been found in temperate grassland in the Alai Mountains. Little else is known about the vole.

It is threatened by habitat loss.
