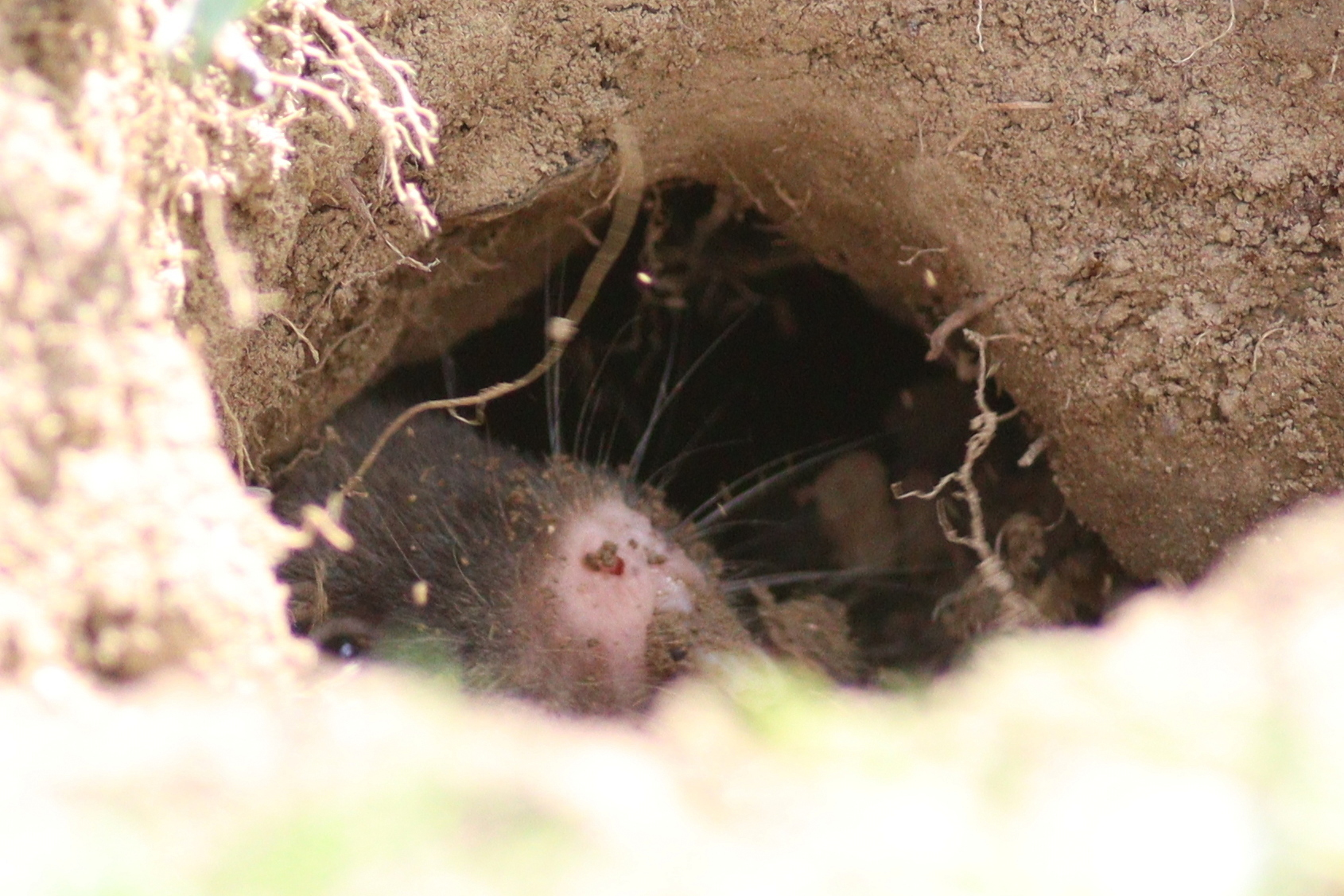
- Transcaucasian mole vole (Bramus lutescens)

Scientific classification
- Domain: Eukaryota
- Kingdom: Animalia
- Phylum: Chordata
- Class: Mammalia
- Order: Rodentia
- Family: Cricetidae
- Subfamily: Arvicolinae
- Tribe: Ellobiusini; Gill, 1872

= Ellobiusini =

Tribe of rodents

Ellobiusini is a tribe of voles containing two genera: Ellobius and Bramus. All extant taxa in this tribe were formerly included in the genus Ellobius. These species are distinguishable from most other voles in that they are highly fossorial, resembling the blesmols and spalacids more than other voles. The long-clawed mole vole is unrelated to these species. The nomenclature of this tribe is unresolved but may be changed to Bramina. "Ellobiusini" may be preoccupied by a tribe of snails in the family Ellobiidae.
