= Southern mole vole =

Conservation status
- Least Concern (IUCN 3.1)

Scientific classification
- Kingdom: Animalia
- Phylum: Chordata
- Class: Mammalia
- Order: Rodentia
- Family: Cricetidae
- Subfamily: Arvicolinae
- Genus: Bramus
- Species: B. fuscocapillus

Binomial name
- Bramus fuscocapillus (Blyth, 1843)

Species of rodent

The southern mole vole (Bramus fuscocapillus) is a species of rodent in the family Cricetidae. It is found in Afghanistan, Iran, Pakistan, and Turkmenistan.

== Chromosomes ==
Southern mole voles are the only member of Ellobiusini demonstrated to have both a normal XY/XX chromosomal sex determination system and an SRY gene.
