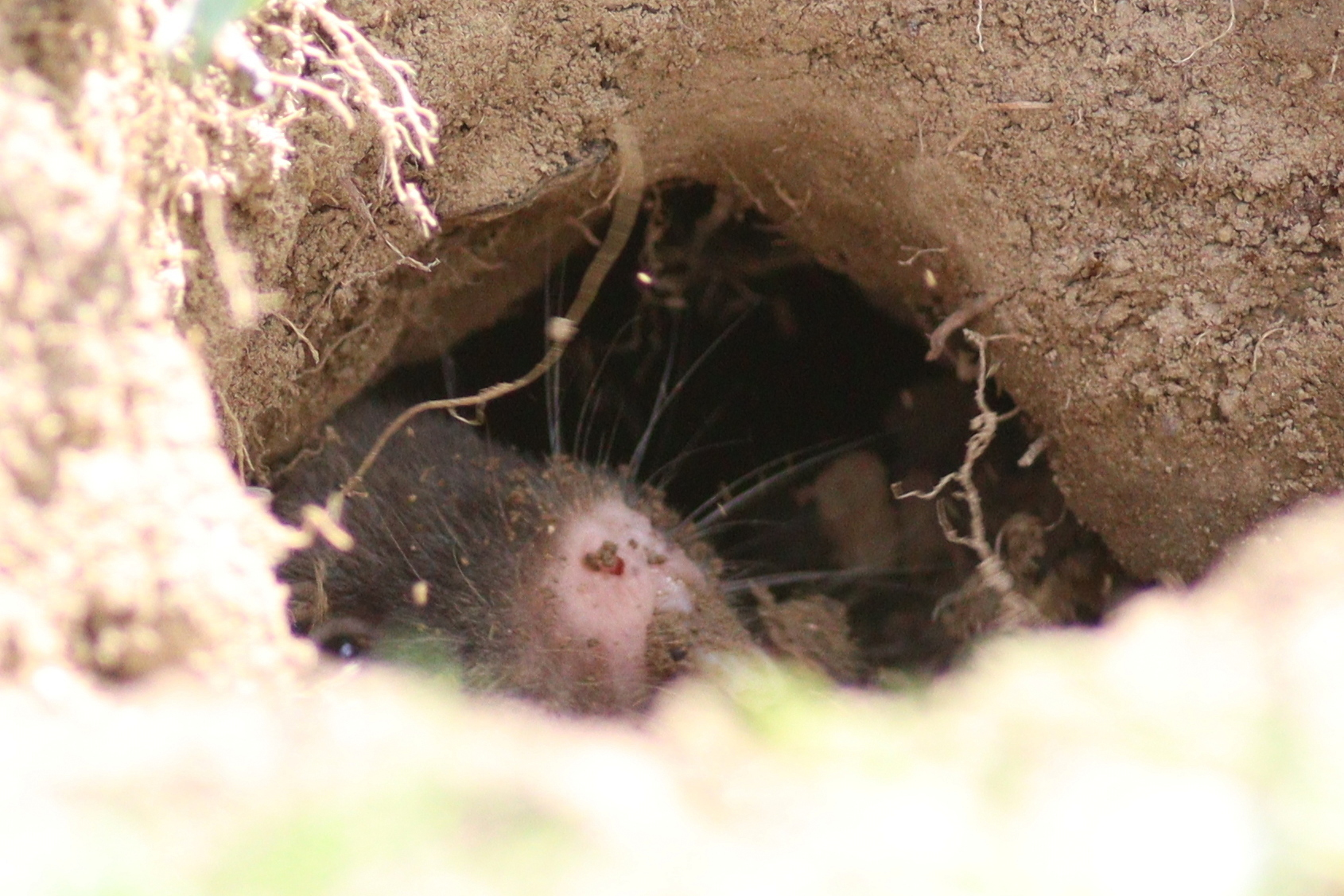
- Transcaucasian mole vole (Bramus lutescens)

Scientific classification
- Domain: Eukaryota
- Kingdom: Animalia
- Phylum: Chordata
- Class: Mammalia
- Order: Rodentia
- Family: Cricetidae
- Subfamily: Arvicolinae
- Tribe: Ellobiusini
- Genus: Bramus; Pomel, 1892

Type species
- Bramus barbarus Pomel, 1892

Species
- †Bramus barbarus Bramus fuscocapillus Bramus lutescens

= Bramus =

Genus of rodents

Bramus is a genus of fossorial rodents. It formerly contained only the extinct North African species Bramus barbarus. Both species in Bramus were moved to this genus from Ellobius. They differ from Ellobius in being larger, having a distinct sagital crest, and other features of the teeth and skull. They also occur allopatrically from Ellobius. They are sexually dimorphic, with females being larger than males. The genus comprises two extant species:

- Southern mole vole, Bramus fuscocapillus (Blyth, 1843)
- Transcaucasian mole vole, Bramus lutescens (Thomas, 1897)
