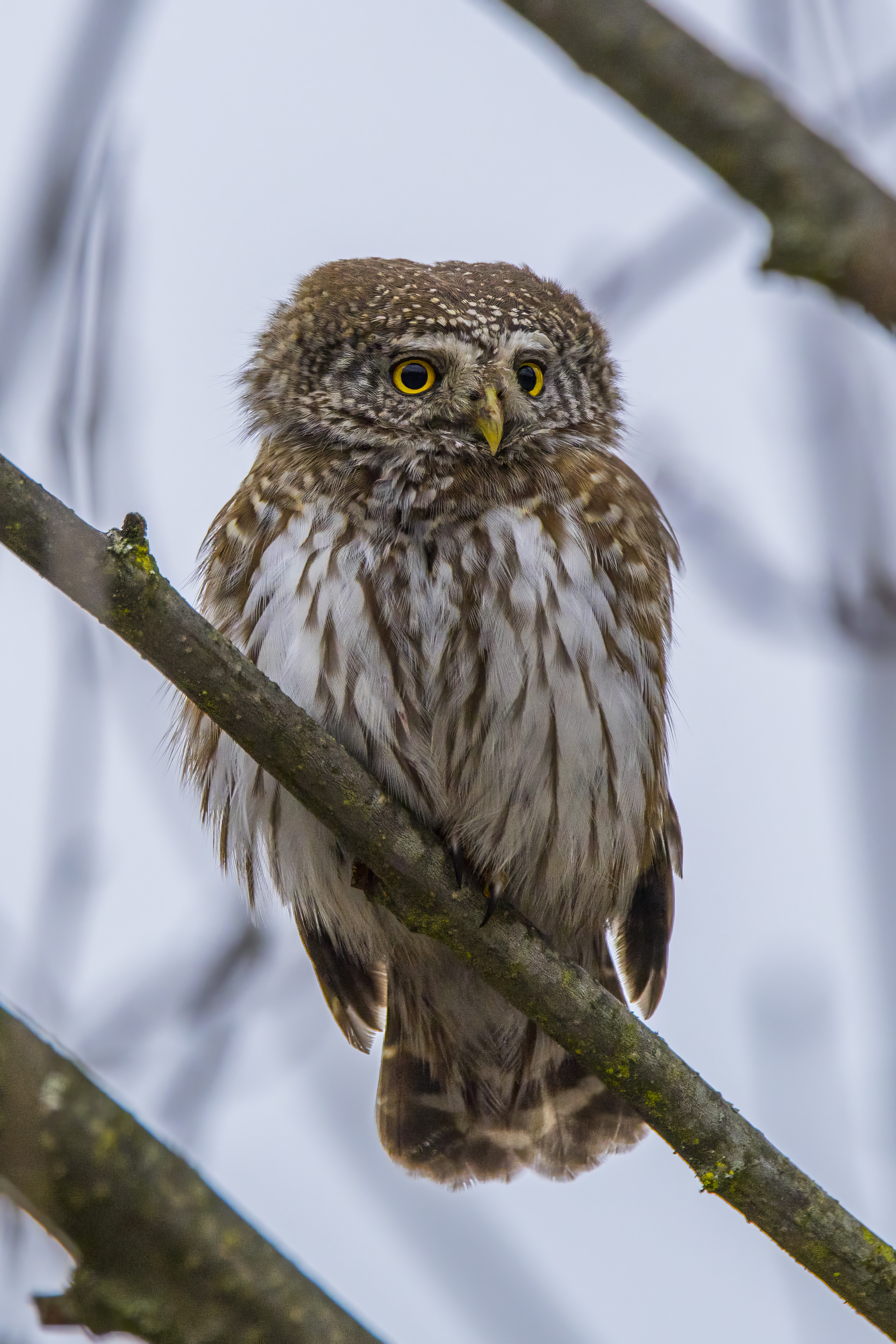
- in Białowieża Forest, Poland

Conservation status
- Least Concern (IUCN 3.1)
- CITES Appendix II

Scientific classification
- Kingdom: Animalia
- Phylum: Chordata
- Class: Aves
- Order: Strigiformes
- Family: Strigidae
- Genus: Glaucidium
- Species: G. passerinum

Binomial name
- Glaucidium passerinum (Linnaeus, 1758)
- Range of G. passerinum Resident

Synonyms
- Strix passerina Linnaeus, 1758

Audio
- Calls recorded in Sweden

= Eurasian pygmy owl =

Species of owl

The Eurasian pygmy owl (Glaucidium passerinum) is the smallest owl in Europe. It is dark reddish to greyish-brown, with spotted sides and half of a white ring around the back of the neck. This species is found in the boreal forests of Northern and Central Europe to Siberia.

This is a sedentary species, meaning that adults are resident throughout the year in its range. The exception may be during harsh winters, when the adults may move south. Young of the species usually move in autumn or winter.

== Taxonomy ==
The Eurasian pygmy owl was formally described by the Swedish naturalist Carl Linnaeus in 1758 in the tenth edition of his Systema Naturae under the binomial name Strix passerina. The type locality is Sweden. The specific epithet is from Latin passerinus meaning "sparrow-like" implying "sparrow sized". This owl is now placed in the genus Glaucidium that was introduced in 1826 by the German zoologist Friedrich Boie.

Two subspecies are recognised:

- Glaucidium passerinum passerinum (Linnaeus, 1758) – central, north Europe to southwest Siberia
- Glaucidium passerinum orientale Taczanowski, 1891 – central, east Siberia, Mongolia and northeast China

== Description ==
The Eurasian pygmy owl is usually red-tinged to a greyish-brown with dots on its back. The tail is generally darker than the body with five narrow, whitish bars. It has a small, short head with white to grey eyebrows and yellow eyes. It lacks the ear tufts that many other owls have. There is a white half-collar on the back of the neck. The belly is mostly white with brown speckles. The beak is a greyish-yellow and hook-shaped.

In order to be able to carry larger vertebrate prey, it has evolved disproportionately large feet. The legs and toes are a brownish-yellow with black talons. Females are 17.4 to 19 cm (6.9 to 7.5 in) long, and males are generally smaller, measuring 15.2 to 17 cm (6.0 to 6.7 in) in length. Females are about 67 to 77 g (2.4 to 2.7 oz), and males are 50 to 65 g (1.8 to 2.3 oz) in weight.

=== Vocalisation ===
The call of the Eurasian pygmy owl is much higher in pitch than what is generally perceived as a normal owl "hoot". The call of the male is a monotonous chain of clear, fluted notes spaced by about two seconds. The call of the female is similar, but higher in pitch. Before and after the mating season, both males and females make a five to seven note rise on the pitch scale.

== Distribution and habitat ==
This owl can be found primarily in coniferous forests of the taiga and higher mountainous regions with coniferous and mixed forests. These areas generally have cooler temperatures and higher rainfall than nearby lowland regions. The owl usually lives along the edges of clearings surrounded by moist or swampy land, generally with a water source nearby. It nests in old woodpecker holes, often those of the great spotted woodpecker.

== Behaviour and ecology ==
This owl is crepuscular, being active during the daylight hours near sunrise and sunset.

=== Breeding ===
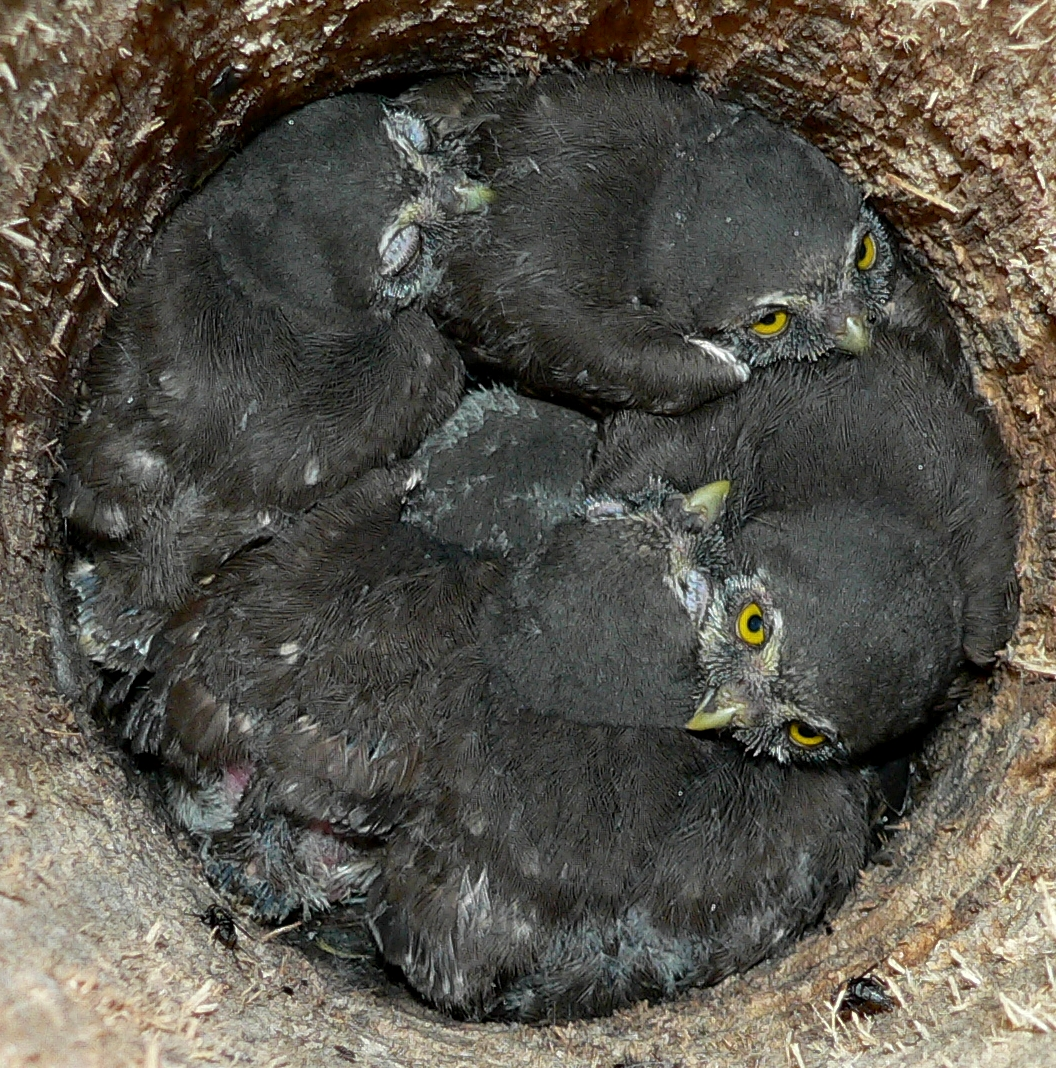
Chicks in a nest box

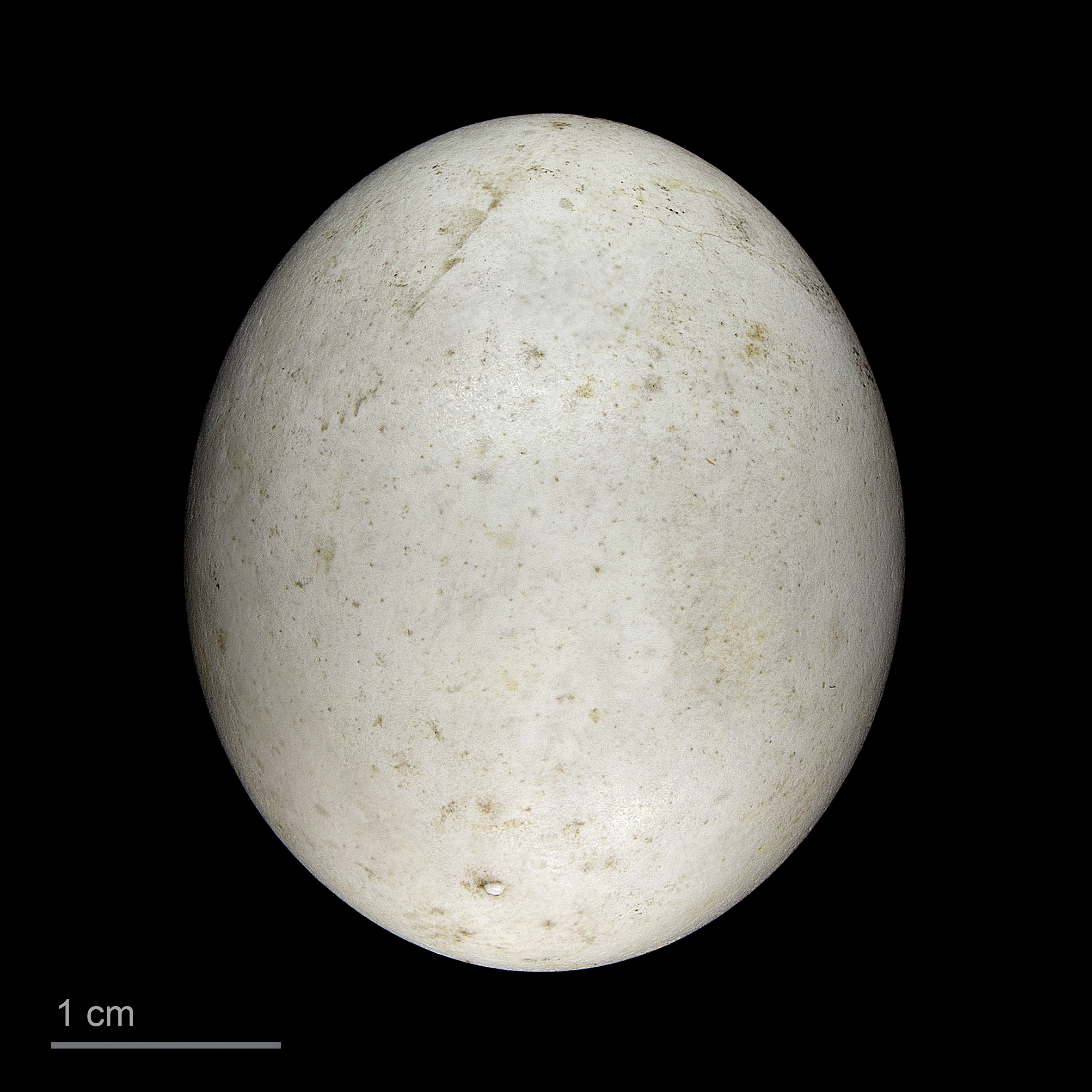
Egg

This owl nests in tree cavities, often in old woodpecker holes, and readily accepts artificial hollows made from logs and rectangular nest boxes.

It shows a strong preference for deep cavities (15 – 30 cm depth) that offer protection from predators, with a front wall thickness of more than 5 cm and a prolonged entrance hole of 45 mm width.

Nest boxes that do not have such a sufficiently thick front wall are seldom used for breeding and instead function as food storage.

It prefers conifers but will occupy birches and beeches.

Pairs form in autumn through early spring. During courtship the male leads the female through his territory. If he has obtained a nest hole, he leads her to it. The male will also feed the female.

This species is serially monogamous, forming bonded pairs for one or more breeding seasons. The male is territorial and may use the same nesting territory for up to seven years. The female lays about four to seven eggs, generally in April. They are incubated for four weeks, starting when the third egg is laid. They hatch nearly simultaneously and the female remains with them for nine to ten days, being fed by the male.

After three weeks the young are active and the female returns to the nest only to feed them and clean out waste. Fledging occurs at 30 to 34 days. The chicks remain close to the nest for a few days before departing.

=== Food and feeding ===
The diet of the Eurasian pygmy owl includes mostly small mammals, such as voles, lemmings, bats, and mice, and small birds such as thrushes, crossbills, chaffinches, and leaf-warblers. They are able to catch birds in flight. Other prey items may include lizards, fish, and insects. Pygmy owls store large quantities of small mammals and birds in the food stores they collect in the autumn and that will be used throughout the winter to supplement their diet. Their food hoarding behaviour is deeply influenced by weather conditions, making them susceptible to climatic changes.
