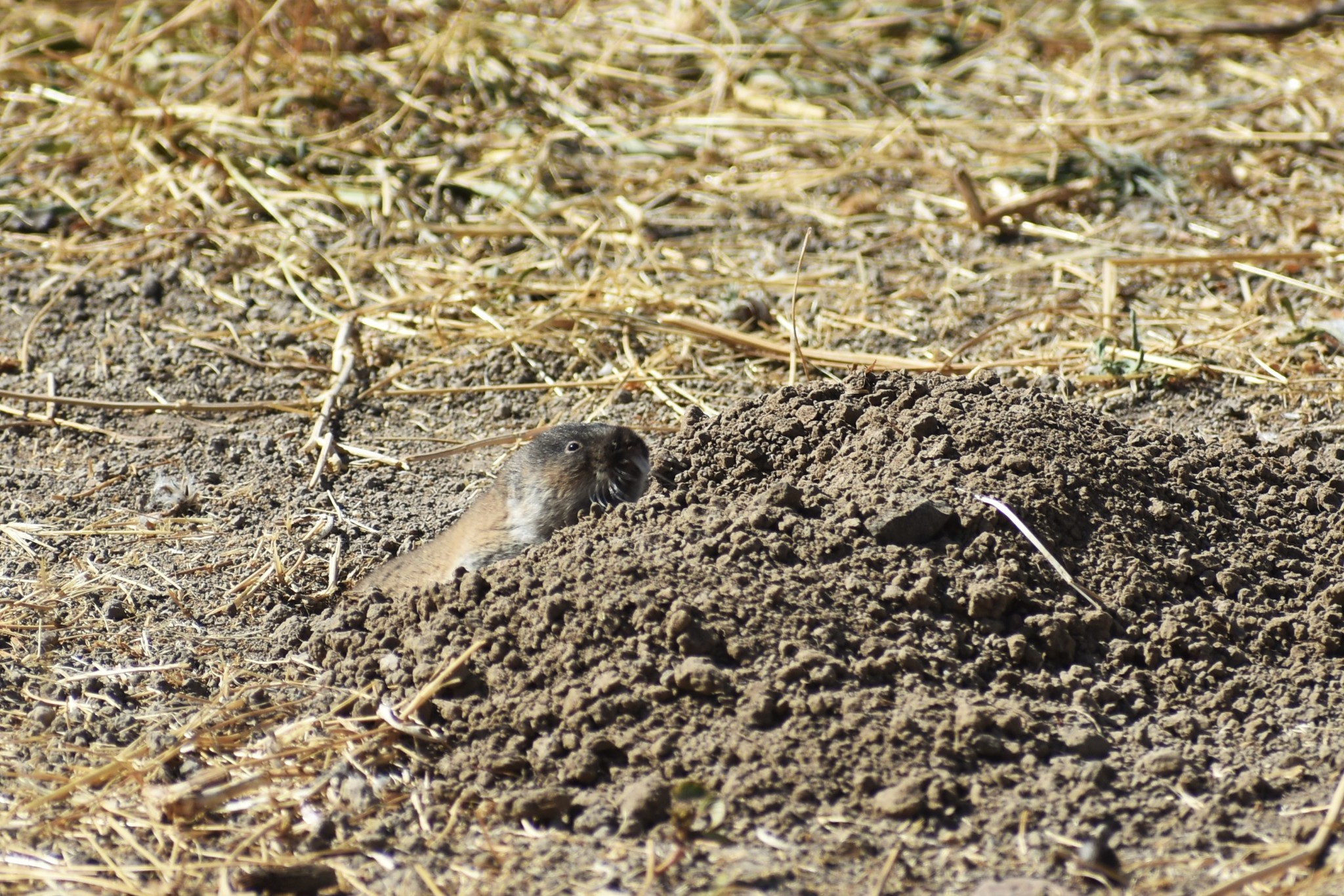
- In Kyzylasker, Kazakhstan

Conservation status
- Least Concern (IUCN 3.1)

Scientific classification
- Kingdom: Animalia
- Phylum: Chordata
- Class: Mammalia
- Order: Rodentia
- Family: Cricetidae
- Subfamily: Arvicolinae
- Genus: Ellobius
- Species: E. tancrei

Binomial name
- Ellobius tancrei Blasius, 1884

Synonyms
- Ellobius kastschenkoi Thomas, 1912; Ellobius ognevi Dukelsky, 1927; Ellobius ursulus Thomas, 1912

= Zaisan mole vole =

Species of rodent

The Zaisan mole vole (Ellobius tancrei), or eastern mole vole, is a species of rodent in the family Cricetidae. It is found in central Asia.

== Description ==
The Zaisan mole vole is highly adapted to life underground. It grows to a head and body length of 95 to 131 mm (3.7 to 5.2 in) with a short tail 8 to 20 mm (0.3 to 0.8 in) long and weighs between 30 and 88 grams (1.1 and 3.1 oz). The coat is dense, soft and velvety. The face and the crown of the head are dark brown and the external ears are reduced to a fleshy ridge. The incisors are pure white, straight and long and project forward in front of the snout. The dorsal surface of the body varies in colour from sandy brown to dark greyish brown and the underparts vary from white to greyish brown. The tail is sandy brown and is tipped with a tuft of greyish-white hair. The hands and feet are broad, have small claws and are covered with white hairs.

== Chromosomes ==
The karyotype is variable, with 2n = 32-54. The Y chromosome has been lost, similar to the case of E. lutescens; however, unlike in E. lutescens, both males and females have a pair of X chromosomes.

== Distribution and habitat ==
The range of the Zaisan mole vole includes Uzbekistan, Tajikistan, Kyrgyzstan, southeastern Kazakhstan, northern Xinjiang (China), northwestern, central and south-eastern Mongolia and Tuva (Russia). Its typical habitat includes steppes, deserts and grasslands. It especially flourishes in moist valleys and near lakes and streams where the soil is deep.

== Behaviour ==
The Zaisan mole vole lives in an extensive burrow system with horizontal passages about 5 or 6 cm (2.0 or 2.4 in) in diameter which are usually 10 to 40 cm (4 to 16 in) below the ground. Other passages lead to storage and nesting chambers at greater depths. These mole voles burrow using their incisors and upward movements of their head to push their way through loose soil. They are active at all times of day and night when underground but seldom emerge onto the surface during the day. At night, they forage over a wide area and feed largely on roots, bulbs and tubers.

Reproduction takes place between April and September when six or seven litters may be produced at intervals of about 35 days. The gestation period is 26 days, with each litter consisting of three to seven offspring which remain in the nest until they are weaned at two months of age. By three months, they are sexually mature.

== Status ==
The Zaisan mole vole has a wide range and a large total population. No particular threats to it have been recognised and the International Union for Conservation of Nature has assessed its conservation status as being of "least concern".

== See also ==
- Transcaucasian mole vole
- Tokudaia osimensis
- Tokudaia tokunoshimensis
