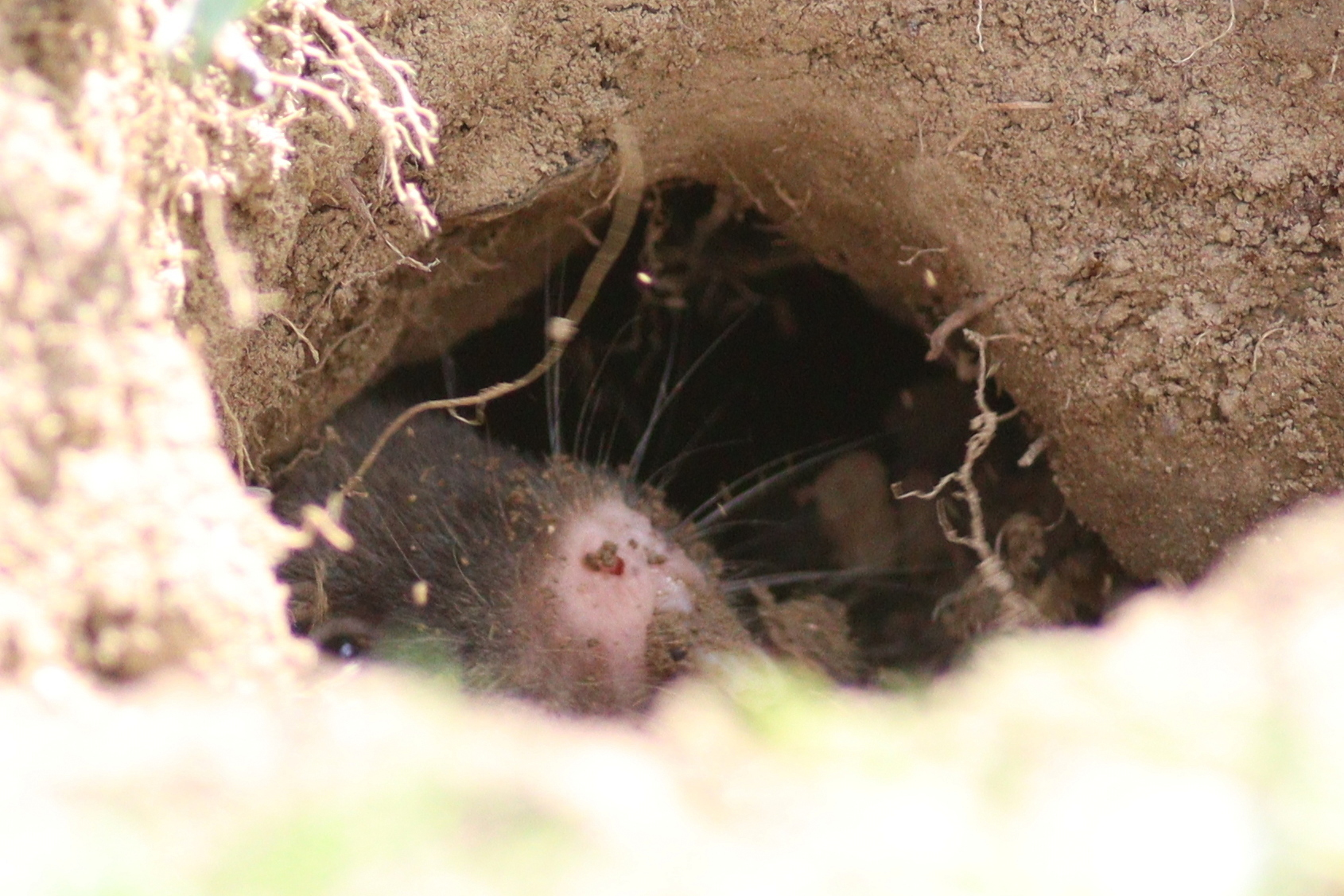

Conservation status
- Least Concern (IUCN 3.1)

Scientific classification
- Kingdom: Animalia
- Phylum: Chordata
- Class: Mammalia
- Order: Rodentia
- Family: Cricetidae
- Subfamily: Arvicolinae
- Genus: Bramus
- Species: B. lutescens

Binomial name
- Bramus lutescens (Thomas, 1897)

= Transcaucasian mole vole =

Species of rodent

The Transcaucasian mole vole (Bramus lutescens) is a species of rodent in the family Cricetidae.

It is found in Armenia, Azerbaijan, Georgia, Iran, and Turkey.

== Reproduction ==
The Transcaucasian mole vole reproduces between the months of April and October, breeding in march-April and October–November. Females gestate their young for 26 days (almost a month). After birth, the pups of the Transcaucasian mole vole, remain with their mother for about two months. During the first 1-4 week of their life, they would just feed with their mother while developing their motor functions. By the fifth week, the pups are weaned off milk and are able to eat solid food, and walk independently without difficulty.

== Chromosomes ==
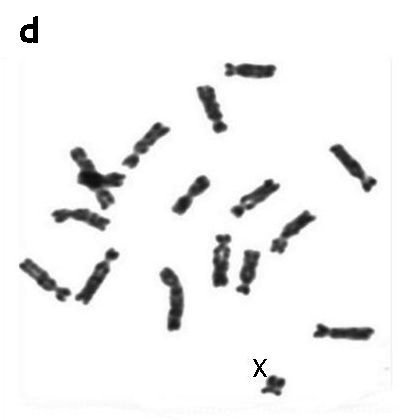
Female B. lutescens metaphase chromosome set

The karyotype of the Transcaucasian mole vole has a low odd diploid number, 2n = 17,X. These voles have no SRY gene or Y chromosome; both sexes have an XO sex chromosome set, a condition possibly derived from an ancestral population in which males had an XX sex chromosome set, like E. tancrei. Their sex-determination method remains unknown.

== See also ==
- Zaisan mole vole
- Tokudaia osimensis
- Tokudaia tokunoshimensis
