= Vocational Agriculture Building =

Historic house in Oregon, United States

- Vista House
- U.S. National Register of Historic Places
- U.S. Historic district – Contributing property
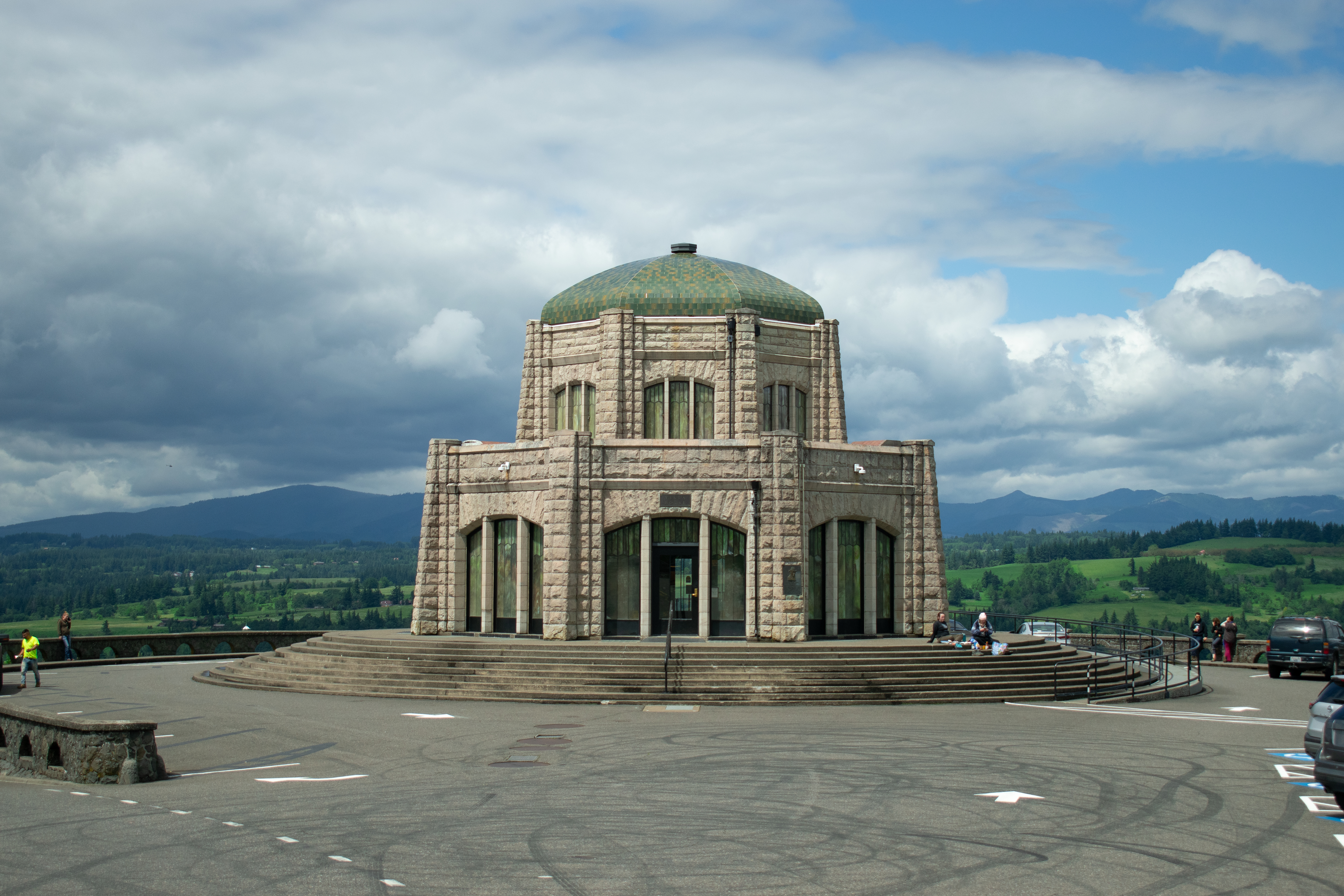
- Vista House

- Location within Oregon Location within the United States
- Location: 40700 E Historic Columbia River Highway; Corbett, Oregon
- Coordinates: 45°32′22″N 122°14′40″W
- Area: 3 acres (1.2 ha)
- Built: 1916–1918
- Architect: Edgar M. Lazarus
- Architectural style: Art Nouveau; Art Deco
- NRHP reference No.: 74001705
- Added to NRHP: November 5, 1974

Vista House is a museum at Crown Point in Multnomah County, Oregon, that also serves as a memorial to Oregon pioneers and as a comfort station for travelers on the Historic Columbia River Highway. The site, situated on a rocky promontory, is 733 feet (223 m) above the Columbia River on the south side of the Columbia River Gorge. The octagonal stone building was designed by Edgar M. Lazarus in the style of Art Nouveau, and completed in 1918 after nearly two years of construction.

In 2000, restoration on the building began, and lasted five years. The Vista House is located within the Corbett locality, and is listed on the National Register of Historic Places.

Vista House is a popular place for viewing the aurora borealis.

== History ==
=== Construction ===
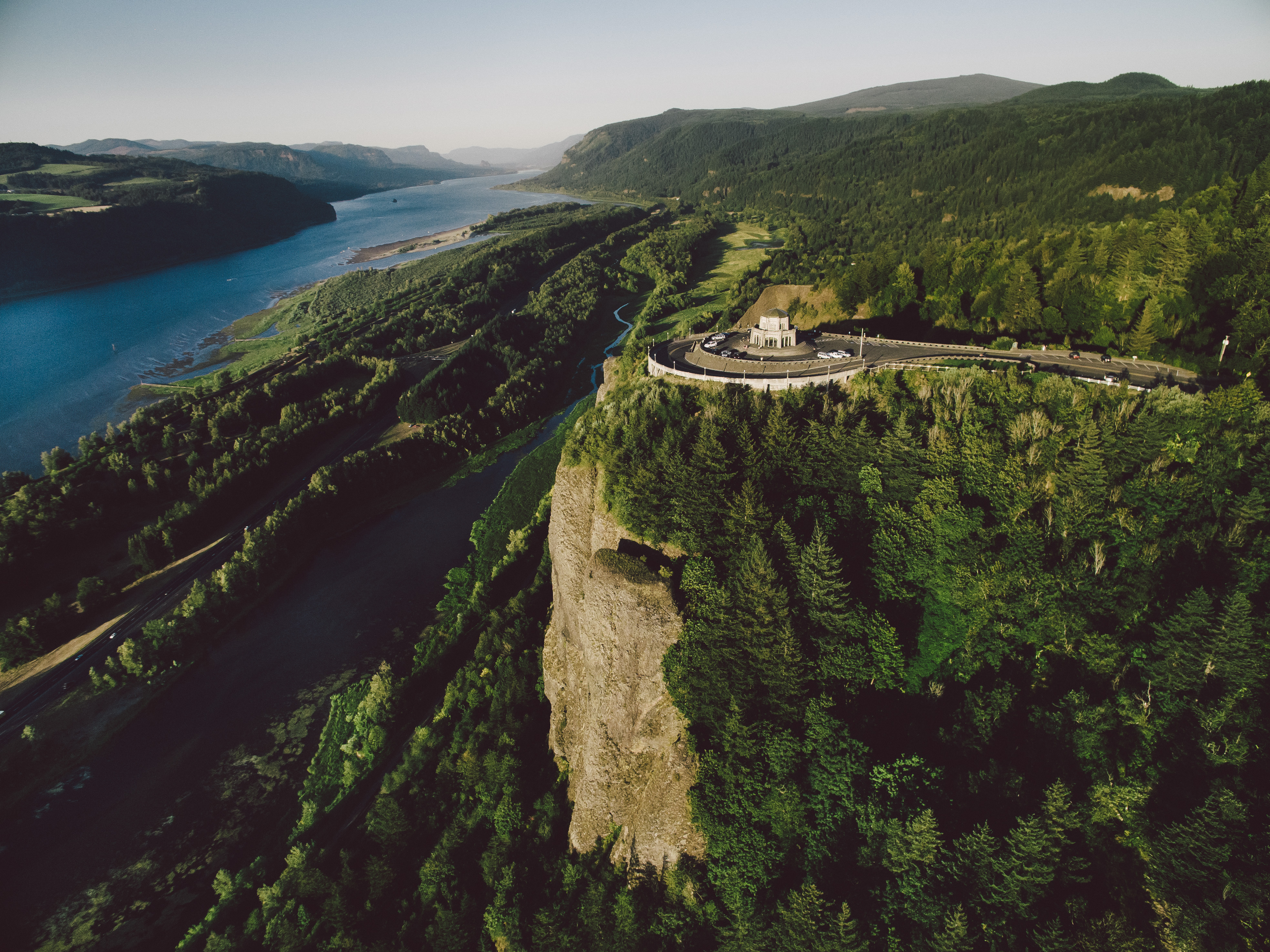
Aerial view of Vista House, Crown Point, and Columbia River

The Vista House was designed by Edgar M. Lazarus, a renowned Oregon architect. With its high-grade marble interior and brass fixtures, some Oregonians at the time derided it as the "$100,000 Outhouse" during its construction. The initial funds for the project, allocated by the public, had totaled $3,812.35. According to an itemized list published by the Oregon Historical Society, the building itself eventually cost approximately $70,000, with an additional $9,000 for the accompanying rock wall; $8,000 for paving and gradation; $6,000 to the architect; and $3,000 for other miscellaneous costs.

The original idea for an observatory at the site came from Samuel Lancaster, the consulting engineer for the Columbia River Highway. Lancaster proposed "an observatory from which the view both up and down the Columbia could be viewed in silent communion with the infinite." Construction of the Vista House began December 29, 1916, and was completed in 1918 and dedicated May 5, 1918. The dedication was overseen by Frank Branch Riley of Portland.

Lancaster also suggested the name "Vista House." The Vista House Association, composed of 52 prominent Portland business and civic leaders, was established to raise money for the project. Funding subscriptions failed to raise sufficient money, and most of the cost of construction was paid by Multnomah County. Construction was supervised by John B. Yeon.

==== Architectural design ====
Lazarus' design incorporates elements of the Jugendstil, the German interpretation of Art Nouveau which had been popular in Europe in the late 19th century up to 1910. The building is essentially a domed rotunda 44 feet (13 m) in diameter with an octagonal plan on a 64-foot-diameter (20 m) base which houses toilets and a gift shop. The rotunda is 55 feet (17 m) high. Stairs lead from the rotunda to an elevated viewing platform at the base of the dome. The exterior is gray sandstone, with a green tile roof. The interior is extensively finished in marble, even in the toilets. The dome interior has bronze lining. The clerestory windows feature opalescent glass in a simple tracery pattern, with similar colored glass at the tops of the windows at the main level.

=== Restoration efforts ===
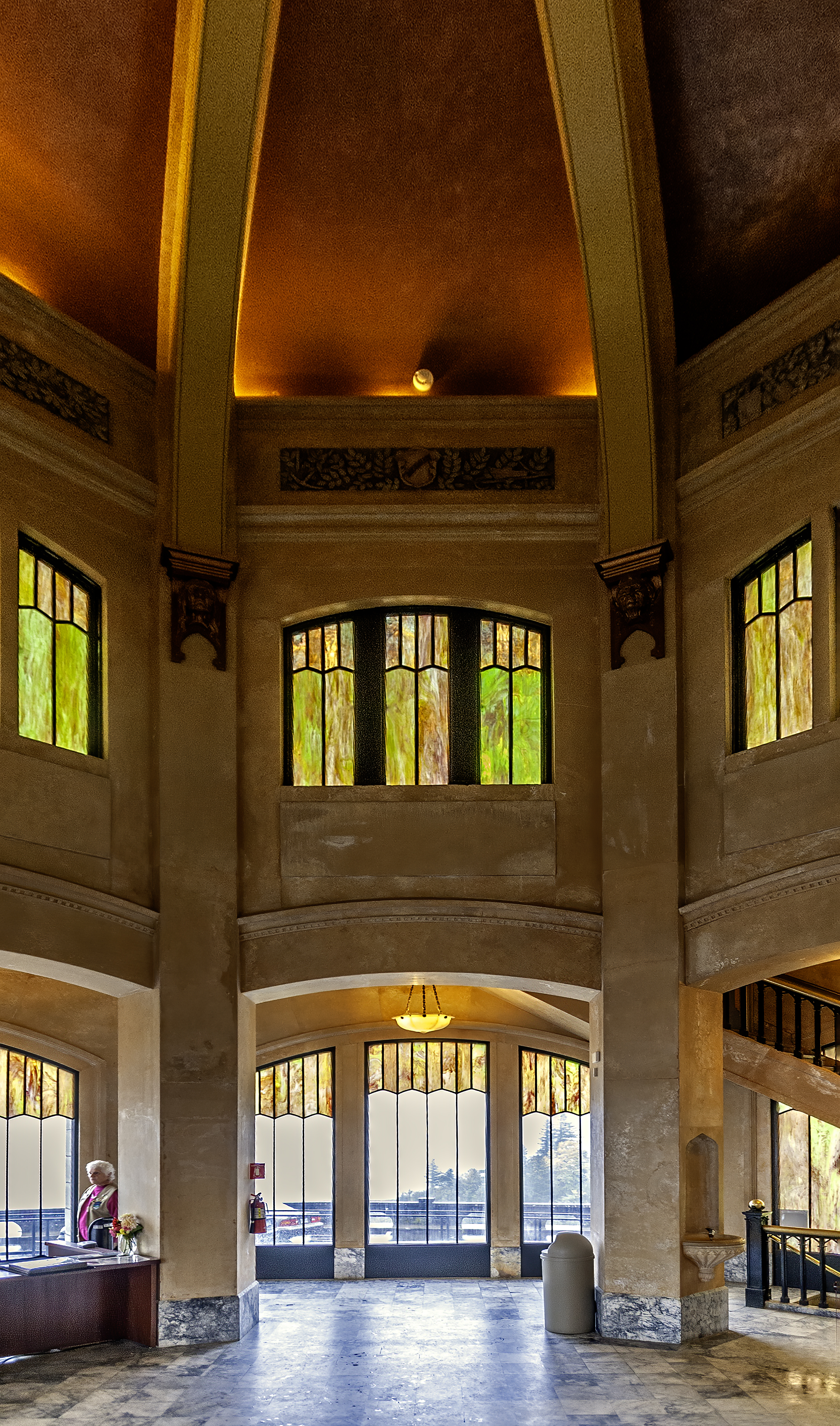
The Vista House interior in 2010

The building is a popular tourist stop for drivers on the Historic Columbia River Highway. The building was refurbished and the interior restored to its 1916 appearance; it reopened in 2005 after five years of restoration work. The roof was completely rebuilt with new tiles and an underlying membrane. Exterior restoration was complete by 2002. Interior work comprised finish repair and replacement, upgrading the sewer system, and the installation of a geothermal heat pump system. The restoration also made Vista House accessible to the handicapped with a disappearing lift between levels. From the top of Vista House, which is accessible by stairs, one can view Portland and Vancouver, Washington to the west. Beacon Rock, on the Washington side of the gorge, is visible to the east.

Vista House is owned by the Oregon Parks and Recreation Department. It was placed on the National Register of Historic Places on November 5, 1974. Crown Point was designated a National Natural Landmark in 1971. Vista House is a major contributing structure in the Columbia River Highway National Historic Landmark.

== Gallery ==
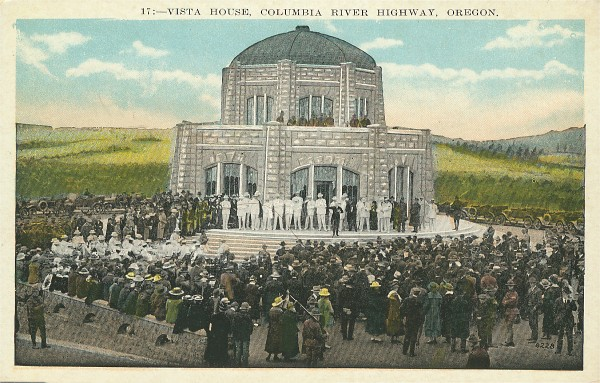
1918 postcard depicting Vista House dedication

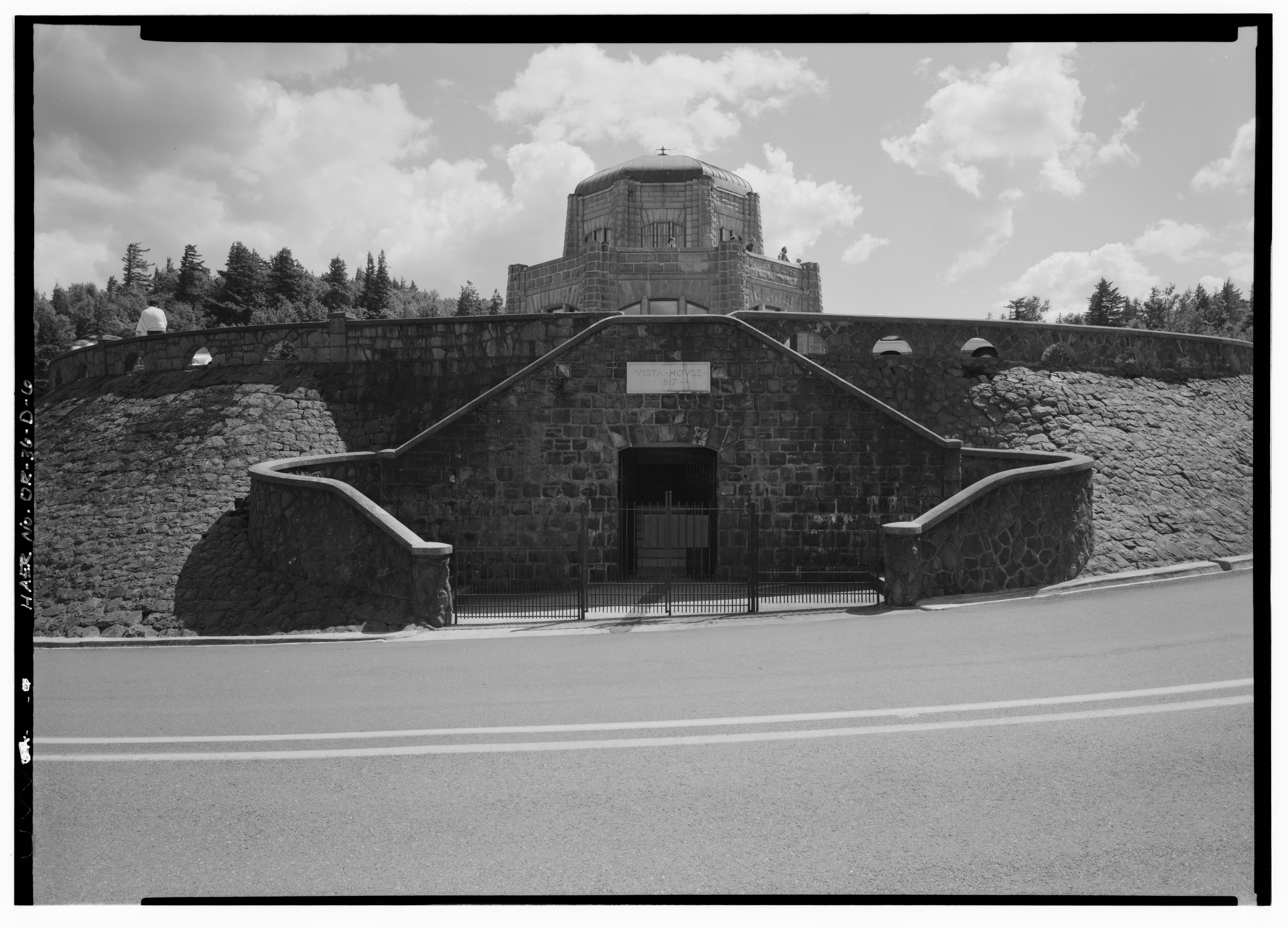
North face of building and mezzanine

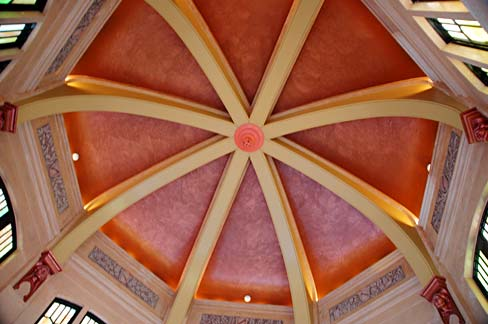
Ceiling detail of interior atrium

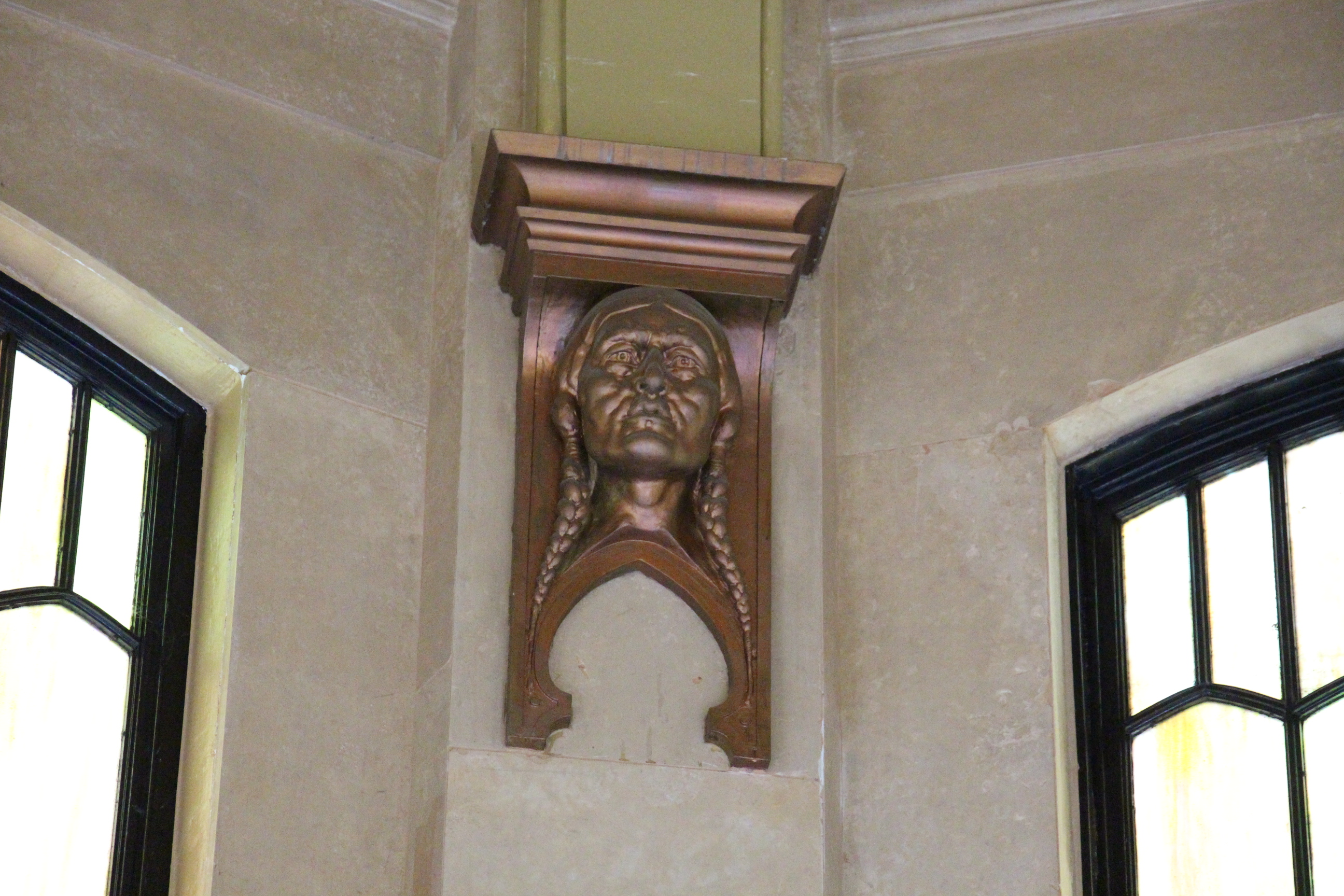
Native American sculpture detail in atrium

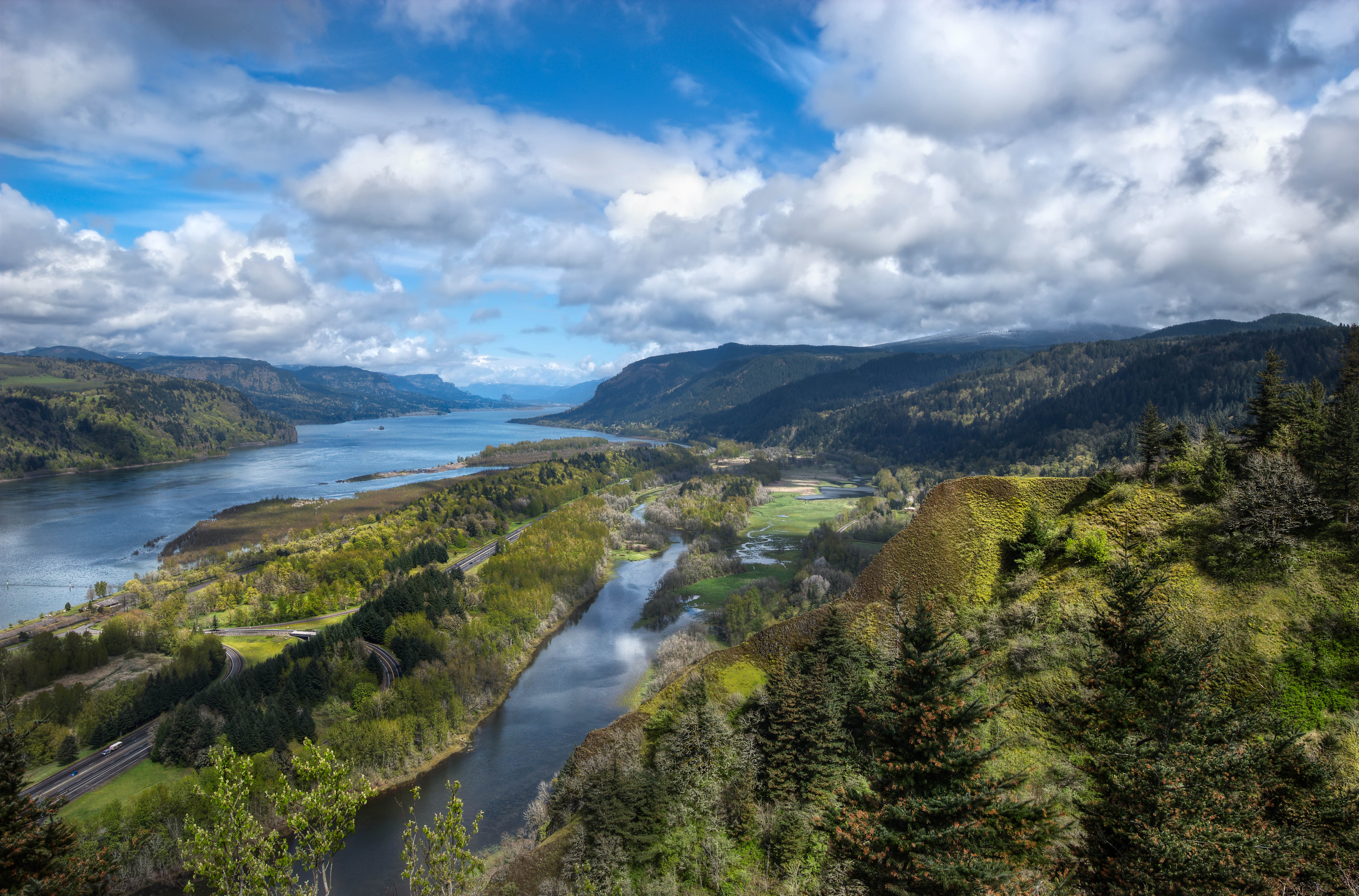
View of the Columbia River from Vista House mezzanine

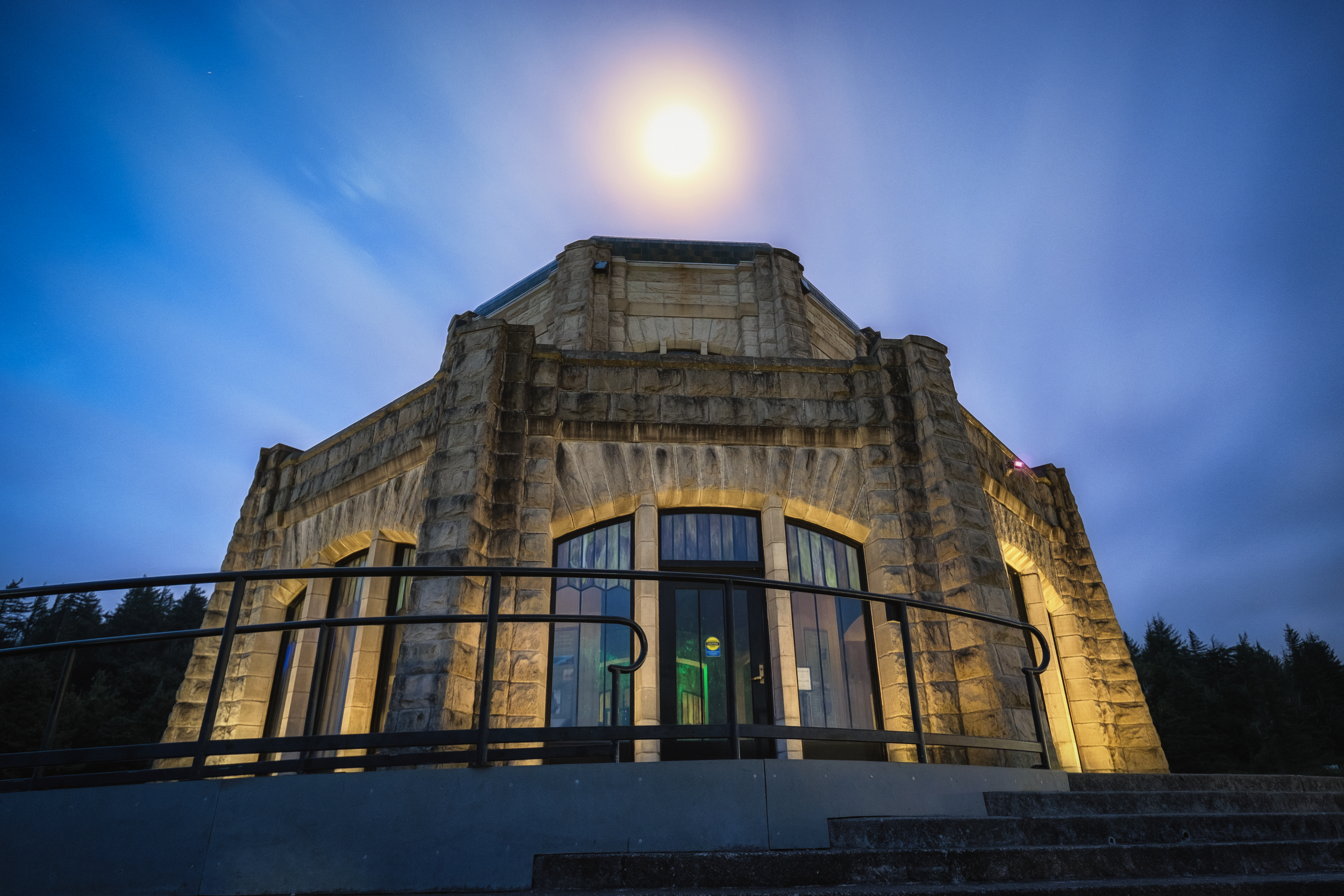
Vista House at dusk

== See also ==
- National Register of Historic Places listings in Multnomah County, Oregon
