= Hotel Ramapo =

Historic building in Portland, Oregon, U.S.

- U.S. National Register of Historic Places
- Portland Historic Landmark
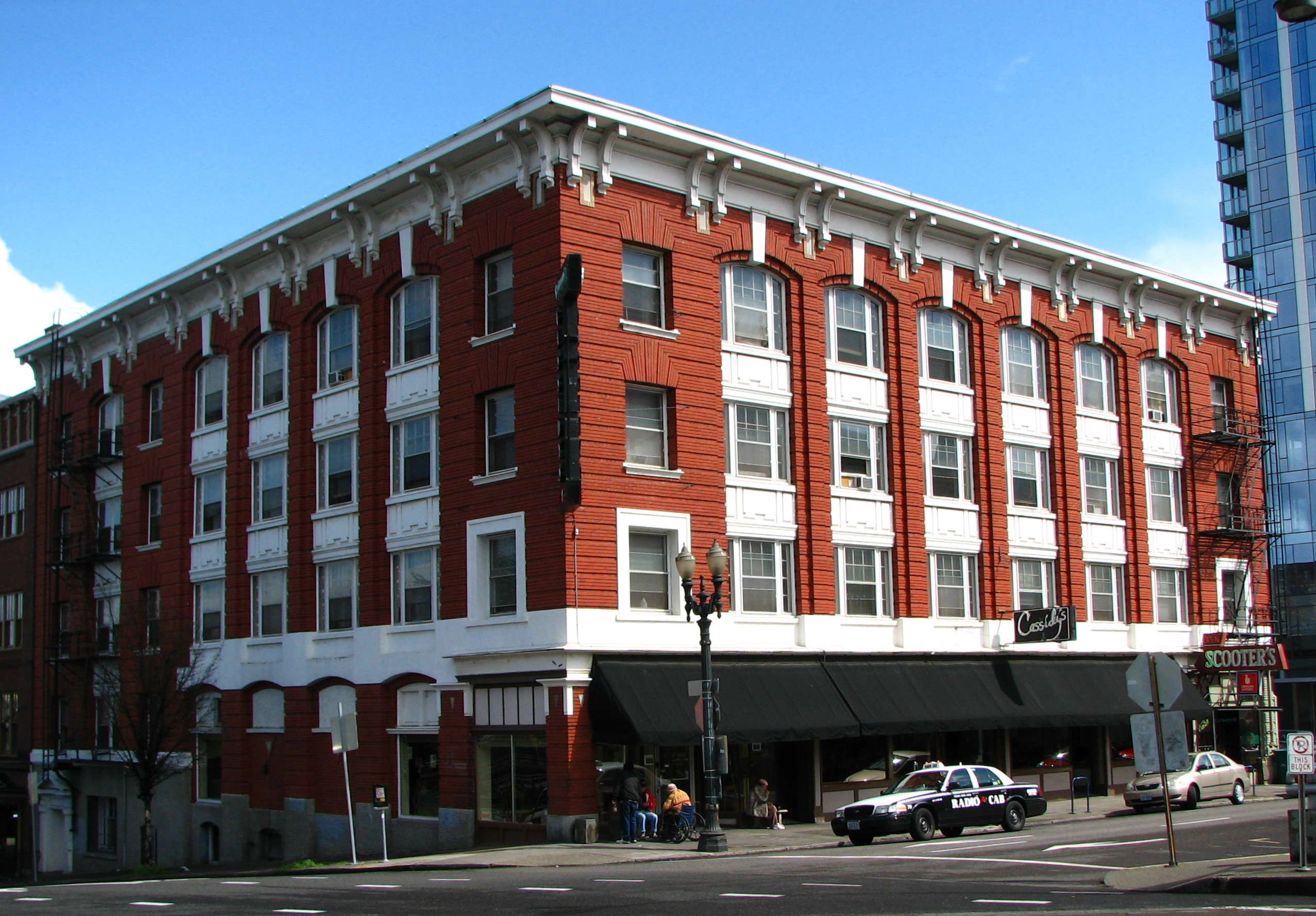
- View from the southwest in 2010, across the intersection of SW 14th Avenue and Washington Street

- Location within Portland, Oregon
- Location: 1337 SW Washington Street; Portland, Oregon
- Coordinates: 45°31′21″N 122°41′06″W
- Built: 1906
- Architect: Edgar M. Lazarus
- NRHP reference No.: 85003474
- Added to NRHP: October 31, 1985

The Hotel Ramapo, now known as Taft Hotel, was previously known as Nortonia Hotel, Danmoore Hotel, and (erroneously) Franklin Hotel. It is a historic residential hotel in Portland, Oregon, United States. Built in 1906, it is listed on the National Register of Historic Places.

== History ==
Designed as a residential hotel by Edgar M. Lazarus in 1906, the building was owned by Lazarus until his death in 1939. He first leased it to Mrs. A. B. Norton, and the hotel's first name was Nortonia Hotel. Mrs. Norton gave up her lease and used the name Nortonia for the next hotel she managed, now known as the Mark Spencer Hotel. In 1908, Lazarus leased the building to Dan Moore, who renamed the structure the Danmoore Hotel. Moore closed the hotel in 1909 when he could not make rent payments. Lazarus, refurnished the building and in June 1909 reopened it with the name Hotel Ramapo, with M. E. Foley as proprietor. In 1955, the Ramapo Hotel became the Taft Hotel, and the name Taft has been employed in the building's subsequent uses. The building then served as a facility for senior and disabled adults known as The Taft Home,, but closed in 2021 in response to numerous code violations that would have cost between $25 million and $30 million to address. The McMenamins hotel chain bought the property in 2024 and in 2026 announced their intention to rehabilitate it as a hotel

=== National Register of Historic Places ===
Franklin Hotel was the erroneous historic name assigned to the building when it was listed on the National Register of Historic Places in 1985. The actual Franklin Hotel, located at 515 SW 13th Avenue, was built in 1907. How the author of the National Register nomination confused, by name, the Franklin Hotel (1907) with the historic Hotel Ramapo designed by Lazarus is not clear. The original National Register nomination makes no reference to Hotel Ramapo, the name by which the building was known for almost fifty years. The historic name was corrected on the National Register in January 2013.

== See also ==
- National Register of Historic Places listings in Southwest Portland, Oregon
