= Yeon Building =

Historic building in Portland, Oregon, U.S.

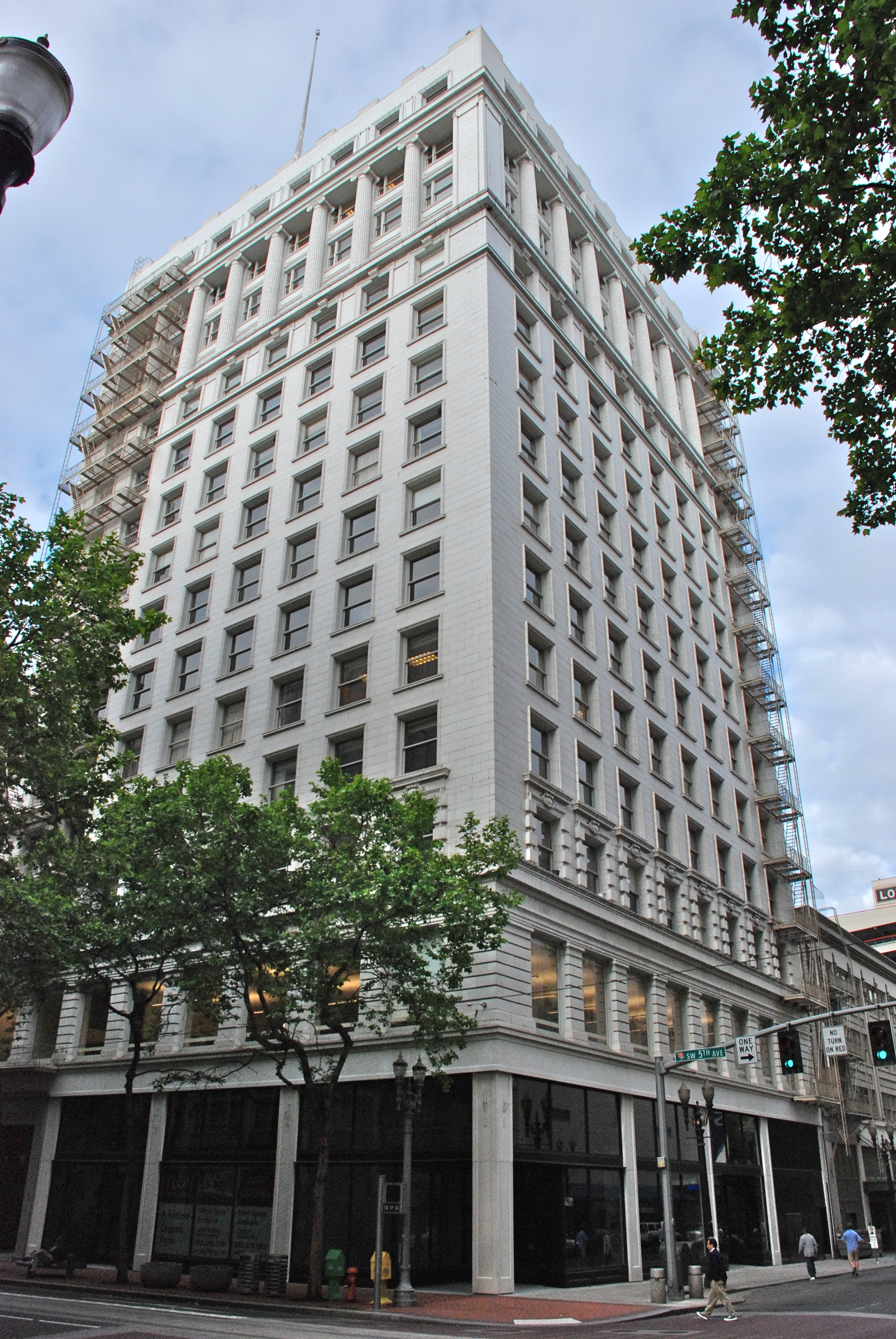
- Yeon Building in 2012

- Location within Portland, Oregon

General information
- Type: Commercial offices
- Location: 522 SW 5th Avenue; Portland, Oregon
- Coordinates: 45.519570°N 122.676769°W
- Completed: 1911
- Operator: Urban Renaissance Group

Height
- Roof: 59.13 m (194.0 ft)

Technical details
- Floor count: 15
- Floor area: 9,569 m^{2} (103,000 sq ft)
- Lifts/elevators: 2

Design and construction
- Architect: Reid & Reid
- Main contractor: Thompson Starrett, WS Dinwiddie
- Yeon Building
- U.S. National Register of Historic Places
- Portland Historic Landmark
- Built by: Thompson-Starrett
- Architectural style: Chicago school, modernist
- NRHP reference No.: 93001497
- Added to NRHP: January 21, 1994

The Yeon Building is a historic 59.13 m (194.0 ft), 15-story office building completed in 1911 in downtown Portland, Oregon. Almost completely clad in glazed terra-cotta, and culminating in a colonnade on the top floors, the Yeon Building once was illuminated at night by light sockets built into the cornices, but later removed. The building's namesake is Jean Baptiste Yeon (1865–1928), a self-made timber tycoon who financed the construction. At the time of completion, the Yeon Building was the tallest building in Oregon and it remained so for nearly two years.

In 1994, the Yeon Building was added to the National Register of Historic Places. The building was repossessed by First Independent Bank in 2010 from Fountain Village Development and re-sold in March 2011 for $8.9 million. The 126,170-square-foot (11,722 m^{2}) was purchased at that time by RGOF Yeon Building LLC.

== See also ==
- Architecture of Portland, Oregon
- National Register of Historic Places listings in Southwest Portland, Oregon
