= United States Customhouse (Portland, Oregon) =

Historic building in Portland, Oregon, U.S.

- U.S. Custom house
- U.S. National Register of Historic Places
- Portland Historic Landmark
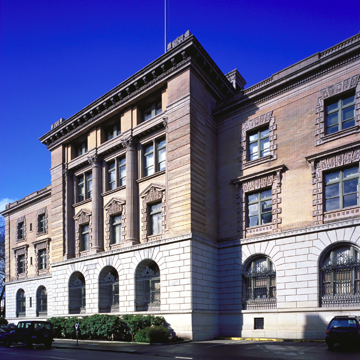
- U.S. Custom House, June 2003

- Location within Portland, Oregon Location within Oregon Location within the United States
- Location: 220 NW 8th Ave., Portland, Oregon
- Coordinates: 45°31′30″N 122°40′37″W
- Area: less than one acre
- Built: 1898–1901
- Architect: Edgar M. Lazarus
- Architectural style: Italian Renaissance Revival
- NRHP reference No.: 74001714
- Added to NRHP: May 2, 1974

The U.S. Custom house is a historic custom house in Portland in Multnomah County, Oregon. It was constructed to house offices of the United States Custom Service. It was built in 1898–1901 and is listed on the U.S. National Register of Historic Places. It is slated to become the second Portland location of Industrious, a coworking space provider, in Spring 2022.

The building was used for filming as the exterior of the Portland Police station in the NBC series Grimm.

== Building history ==
Fueled by Portland's economic development during the late 19th century, the U.S. Custom House was constructed to accommodate the city's burgeoning prosperity and status. In 1875, the U.S. Custom Service first established a presence in Portland, moving into the newly constructed U.S. Post Office, Courthouse, and Custom House building (now known as the Pioneer Courthouse). As the city outgrew the space, a new Federal building was planned to house the Custom Service and additional courtrooms. In 1898, construction began on the present U.S. Custom House, reaching completion in 1901.

The building was designed in the office of James Knox Taylor, Supervising Architect of the U.S. Treasury Department, and constructed under the supervision of architect Edgar M. Lazarus. Lazarus is known for his designs for the Vista House at Crown Point and the Agricultural Palace for the Lewis and Clark Centennial Exposition (no longer extant). Together, Taylor and Lazarus brought the new Custom House to fruition in a style inspired by the English Renaissance architecture of the 17th and 18th centuries, with similarities to the mannered style that characterized London architect James Gibbs's public architecture.

In 1938, the east and west wings gained fourth floors to accommodate additional office space. In 1968, when the U.S. Custom Service moved into the Old Post Office Building at 511 NW Broadway, the North Pacific Division of the U.S. Army Corps of Engineers occupied the building, until they moved to a new location in December 2004. The building's scale and distinguished design aesthetically enhances its neighborhood and serves as an anchor on the margin of the North Park Blocks, a row of seven blocks originally intended as open space in the late 19th century. In 1970, upon the recommendation of the Portland Historic Landmarks Commission, the City Council designated the U.S. Custom House as a Historic Landmark. In 1973, the U.S. Custom House was listed in the National Register of Historic Places.

=== Current Use ===
After the US Custom was vacated in 2004 the Custom House was considered for an International School though ultimately this was determined not to be feasible and the Property was put up for auction. After an extended process the Property was purchased at auction by Eastern Real Estate LLC in March 2012 with a bid of $4.74 million, with the sale finalized in October 2012. In April 2015, WeWork announced plans to expand to Portland, leasing the Custom House for use as shared office space. In conjunction with WeWork's leasing the entire Custom House building the Property was renovated in phases and WeWork opened for business in 2017. The property was intricately restored under the dedicated guidance of local architect, Dick Kirschbaum, of GBD Architects. Eastern Real Estate sold the Property in Q4 2017 to a new owner. WeWork left the Customs House location in 2021, as a result of the COVID-19 pandemic, the massive protests in response to the murder of George Floyd, and the situation regarding homeless people in downtown Portland.

== Architecture ==
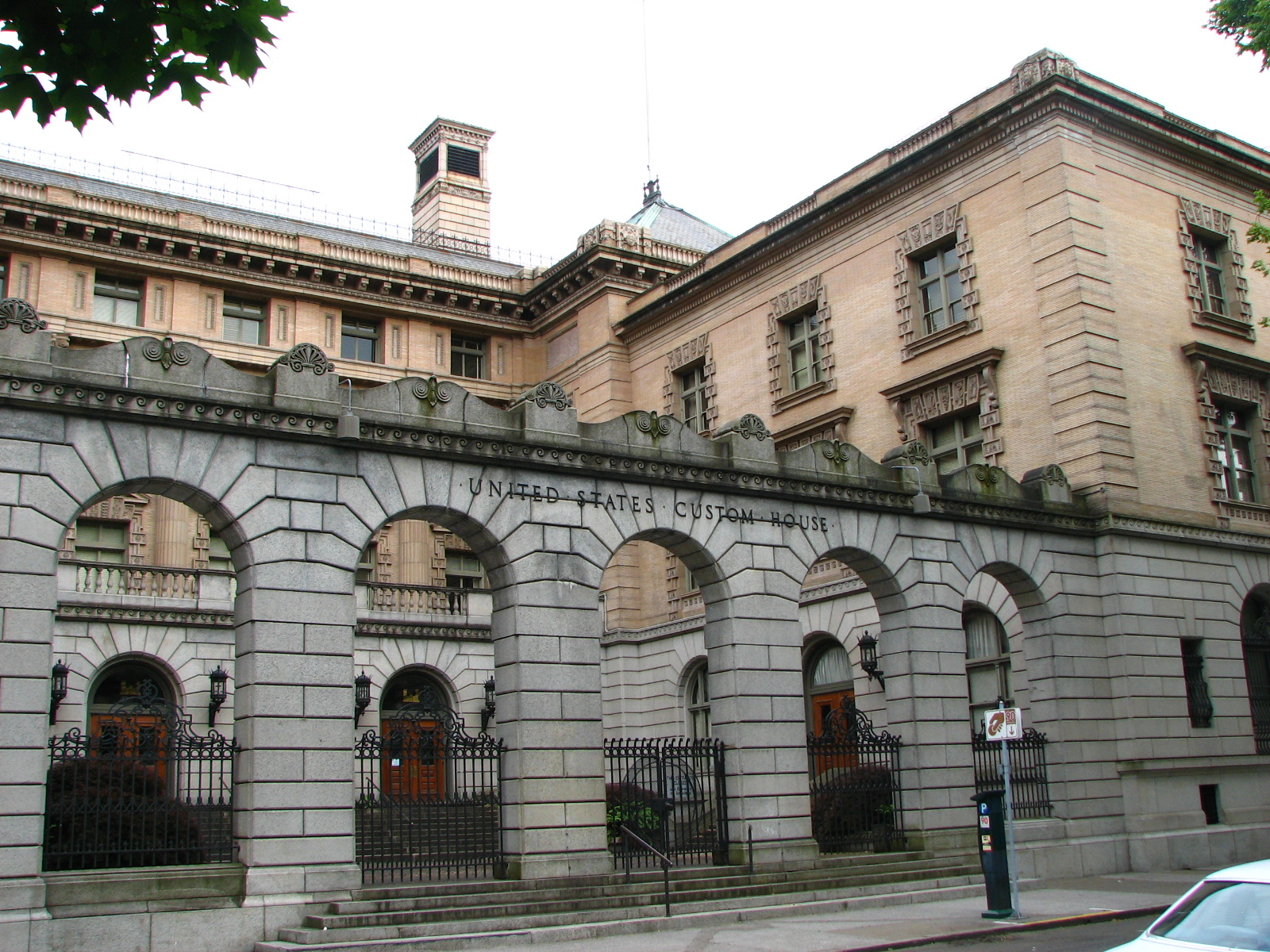
Custom House building, June 2008

Portland's U.S. Custom House is a large edifice, encompassing a full block bounded by NW Broadway, Everett and Davis Streets, and Eighth Avenue, near the downtown. The four-story building is symmetrical, H-shaped in plan, featuring pavilions extending to the north and south from the central mass. An elegant one-story granite loggia of five tall, arched openings with rusticated walls and a scrolled parapet encloses the entry courtyard and opens onto Eighth Avenue and the North Park Blocks beyond.

The U.S. Custom House is an exemplary display of the Italian Renaissance Revival style of architecture, exhibiting Baroque and Mannerist features. The building's first-story walls are brick masonry sheathed in light-gray granite, with rusticated joints and quoins at the corners, and are pierced by window and door openings headed with articulated semicircular arches. A continuous granite stringcourse carved with Vitruvian scrolls and a balustrade above divide the first and second floors. The upper stories are composed of Roman brick with terra-cotta detailing and crowned with a dentil cornice molding supported by scrolled consoles. The flanking pavilions are capped with slate-covered pyramidal roofs, prominently featuring two ornamental vent stacks clad in terra cotta atop a rusticated stone base.

A distinctive feature that evokes the interpretative style of the mid-16th-century Italian Mannerist architecture is the ornamentation of the fenestration. This is most prominent with the second- and third-story windows’ display of the "Gibbs surround," which is characterized by keystones and spaced blocks surrounding large windows. Here, this motif is composed of terra-cotta displaying bead and reel decoration, elaborately carved quoins, keystones, and Doric order moldings. Framing the second- and third-story bays of the north and south pavilions are two-story engaged Corinthian columns, supporting a continuous architrave, which is capped with a dentiled cornice and a parapet of alternating brick panels and open balusters.

Italian Renaissance Revival finishes and details are reflected on the interior spaces of the Custom House. Arched doorways, marble-clad piers, and beams with classical plaster moldings define the three bays of the first-floor entry vestibule, extending into the first- floor lobby where they are articulated with groined vaults and paneled arch soffits. Marble wainscoting continues around the room and extends to the spring line. Each story's lobby is similarly treated, but using ascending classical orders – Doric on the first floor, Ionic order on the second, and Corinthian order on the third.

A grand cast-iron stairway extends from the center of the first floor to the fourth floor, featuring marble treads, double balusters with spiral and acanthus ornamentation, paneled stringers and soffits, and a molded oak handrail. Originally, windows at the landings opened into a light court, which was covered with solid panels in 1949, leaving the oak framing and trim intact. The existing vestibule and main stair lobbies are well-preserved spaces which remain as the most detailed and significant areas in the building.

Typically, the office spaces include plaster finishes with oak baseboards, chair rails, and picture moldings. Although initial plans in 1897 called for two-story courtrooms in the large spaces at each end of the central wing at the third floor, these were omitted from the design after construction began in 1900. While the courtroom spaces were simplified, their large, central skylights in the paneled ceilings above were retained. The interiors were rehabilitated in 1977, removing obtrusive firewalls that had been installed in the stairwells. In 1992, GSA undertook an extensive exterior preservation project to clean, repair, and restore the historic building to its original condition.

== Significant events ==
- 1898-1901: The U.S. Custom House is constructed.
- 1901: The building is opened.
- 1937-1939: The north and south pavilions gain a fourth floor.
- 1968: The U.S. Custom Service moves into the old Post Office Building, and the U.S. Army Corps of Engineers becomes the primary tenant.
- 1970: The building is designated as a Portland Historic Landmark.
- 1973: The building is listed in the National Register of Historic Places.
- 1977: The interiors are rehabilitated.
- 1992: An extensive GSA exterior preservation project renews masonry work, windows and courtyard entry doors.

== Building facts ==
- Architect: James Knox Taylor and Edgar Lazarus
- Construction Dates: 1898–1901; 1937–1939
- Landmark Status: Portland Historic Landmark; Listed in the National Register of Historic Places
- Location: 220 NW Eighth Avenue
- Floor Area: 99,742 sq.ft
- Architectural Style: Italian Renaissance Revival
- Primary Materials: Granite, Roman brick, terra-cotta
- Prominent Features: Mannerist exterior detailing, featuring "Gibbs Surrounds"; cast-iron staircase
