= George F. Heusner House =

Historic building in Portland, Oregon, U.S.

- U.S. National Register of Historic Places
- U.S. Historic district – Contributing property
- Portland Historic Landmark
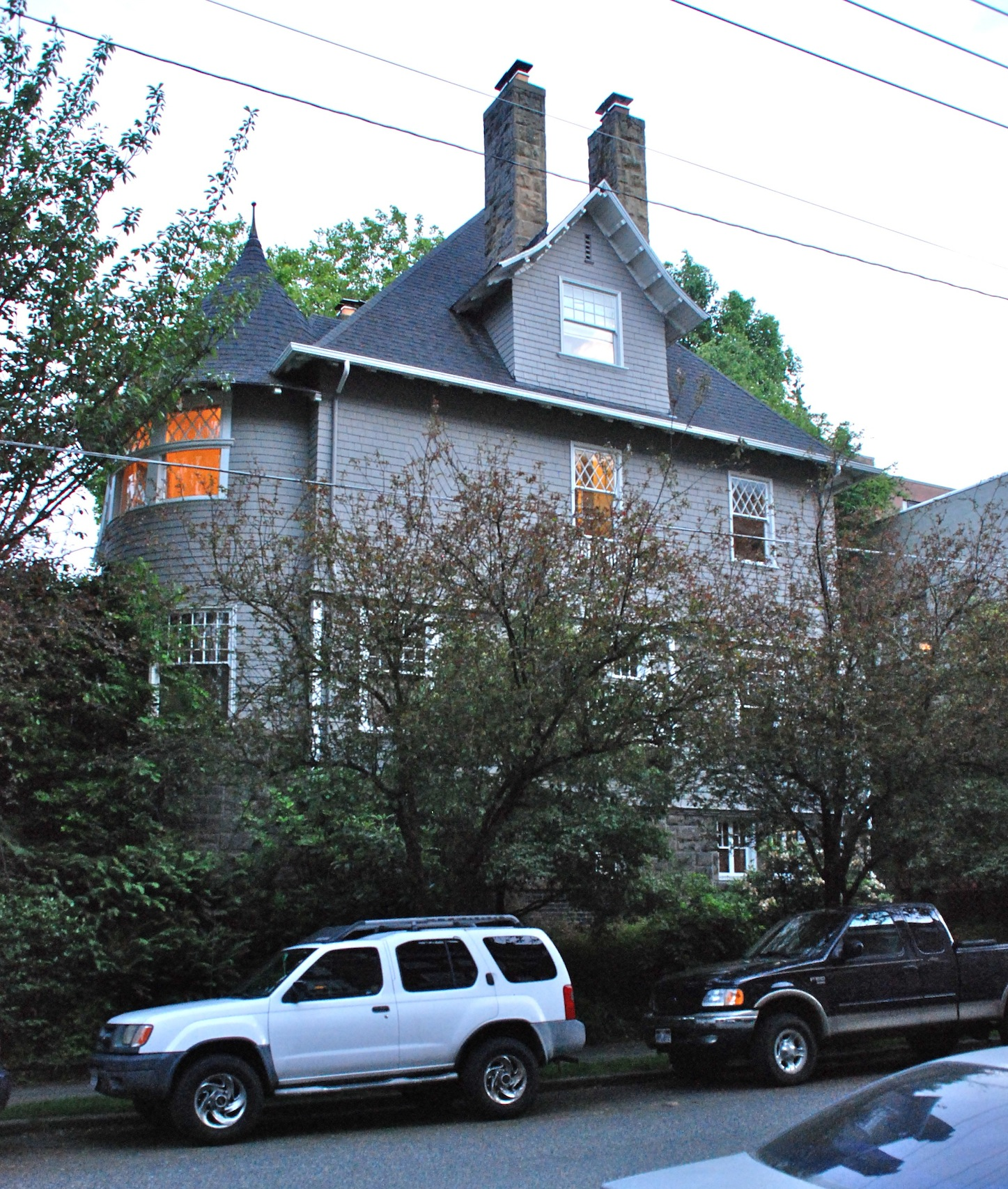
- George F. Heusner House (side view) in 2011

- Location within Oregon Location within the United States
- Location: 333 NW 20th Avenue; Portland, Oregon
- Coordinates: 45°31′32″N 122°41′34″W
- Area: 0.2 acres (0.081 ha)
- Built: 1894
- Architect: Edgar M. Lazarus
- Architectural style: Queen Anne, Shingle Style
- Part of: Alphabet Historic District (ID00001293)
- NRHP reference No.: 78002316
- Added to NRHP: October 19, 1978

The George F. Heusner House is a historic house in northwest Portland, Oregon. It is listed on the National Register of Historic Places.

== See also ==
- National Register of Historic Places listings in Northwest Portland, Oregon
