= Morrow County Courthouse (Oregon) =

- U.S. National Register of Historic Places
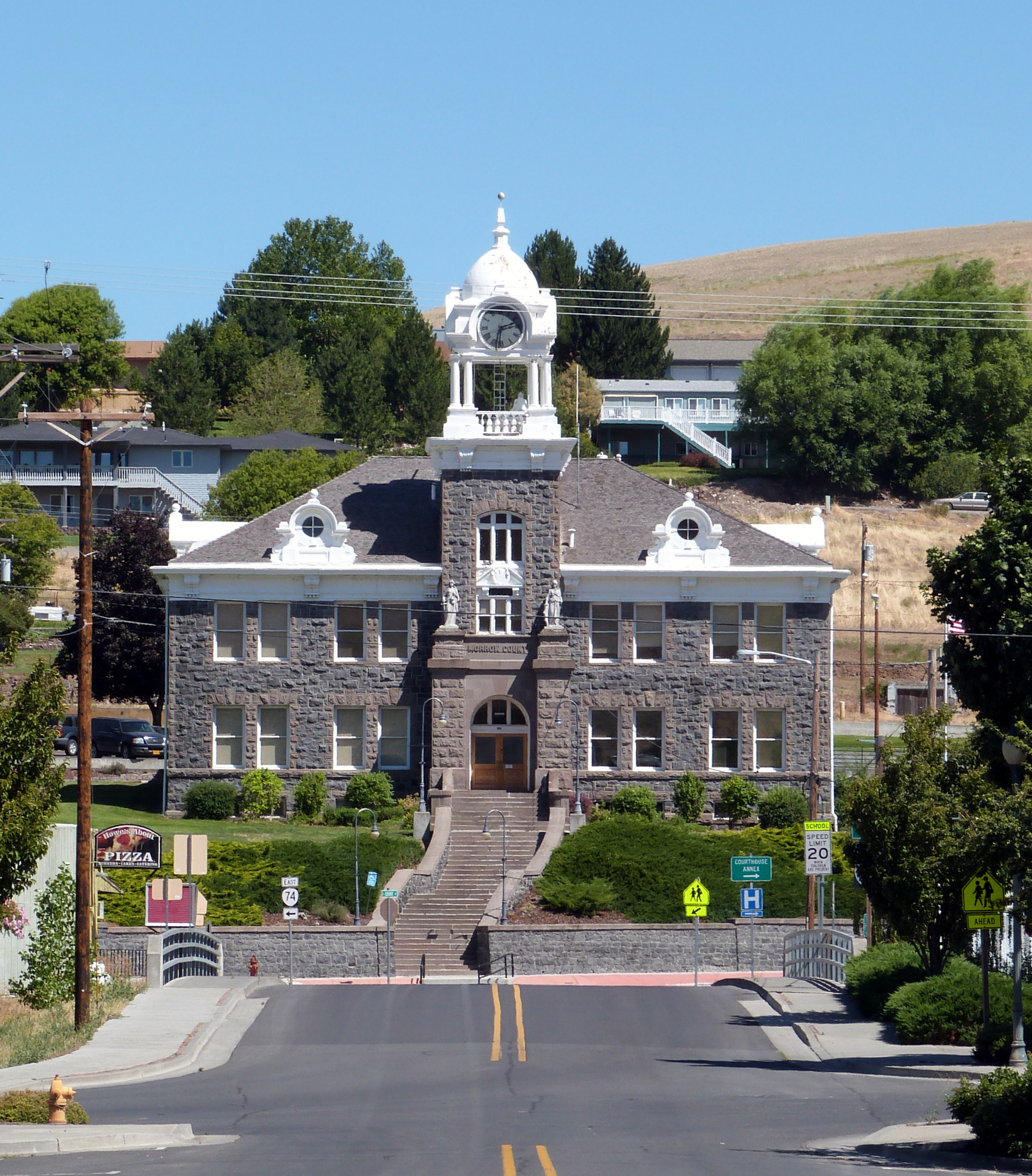
- Exterior in 2012

- Location within Oregon Location within the United States
- Location: 100 Court St., Heppner, Oregon
- Coordinates: 45°21′13″N 119°32′56″W
- Area: Less than 1 acre (0.40 ha)
- Built: 1902–03
- Built by: J. K. Carr
- Architect: Edgar M. Lazarus
- Architectural style: Eclectic American Renaissance
- NRHP reference No.: 85000366
- Added to NRHP: February 28, 1985

The Morrow County Courthouse is a building in Heppner in the U.S. state of Oregon. Built in 1902–03, it was listed on the National Register of Historic Places in 1985. It was among the early commissions of architect Edgar M. Lazarus.

Built on the site of an earlier courthouse made of wood, the two-story building is made of locally quarried dark blue basalt and lighter trim stone from quarries near Elgin and Baker. Features include a hip roof, a central entrance pavilion, and a domed cupola with clock faces on three sides.

The courthouse site is elevated above much of the rest of the city, and this saved the building from severe flood damage in 1903. County officials had moved into the building in March; in June of the same year, much of Heppner was destroyed and 247 people killed by a flash flood on Willow Creek, which bisects the city.

== See also ==
- National Register of Historic Places listings in Morrow County, Oregon
