= Edgar M. Lazarus =

American architect

- Born: June 6, 1868; Baltimore, Maryland, U.S.
- Died: October 2, 1939 (aged 71); Portland, Oregon, U.S.
- Occupation: Architect
- Buildings: Vista House: Taft Hotel; Clatsop County Courthouse

Edgar Marks Lazarus (June 6, 1868 – October 2, 1939) was an American architect who was prominent in the Portland, Oregon, area for more than 45 years. He was best known as the architect of the Vista House on Crown Point in the Columbia River Gorge.

== Early life and education ==
Edgar Lazarus was born on June 6, 1868, in Baltimore, Maryland. He was a descendant of the Colonial Jews of Charleston, South Carolina, and was the son of a Confederate soldier.

== Career ==
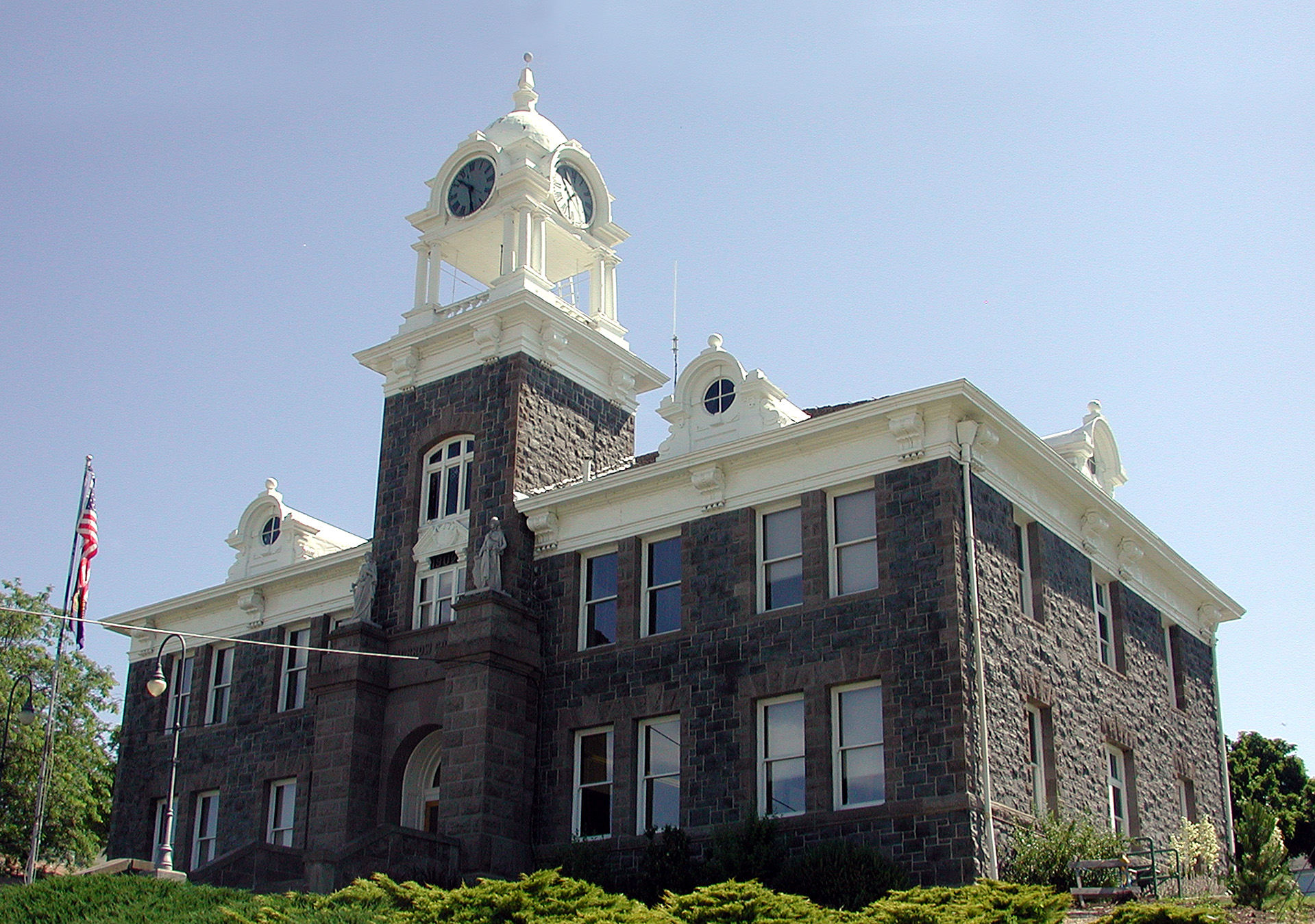
Morrow County Courthouse, Heppner, Oregon

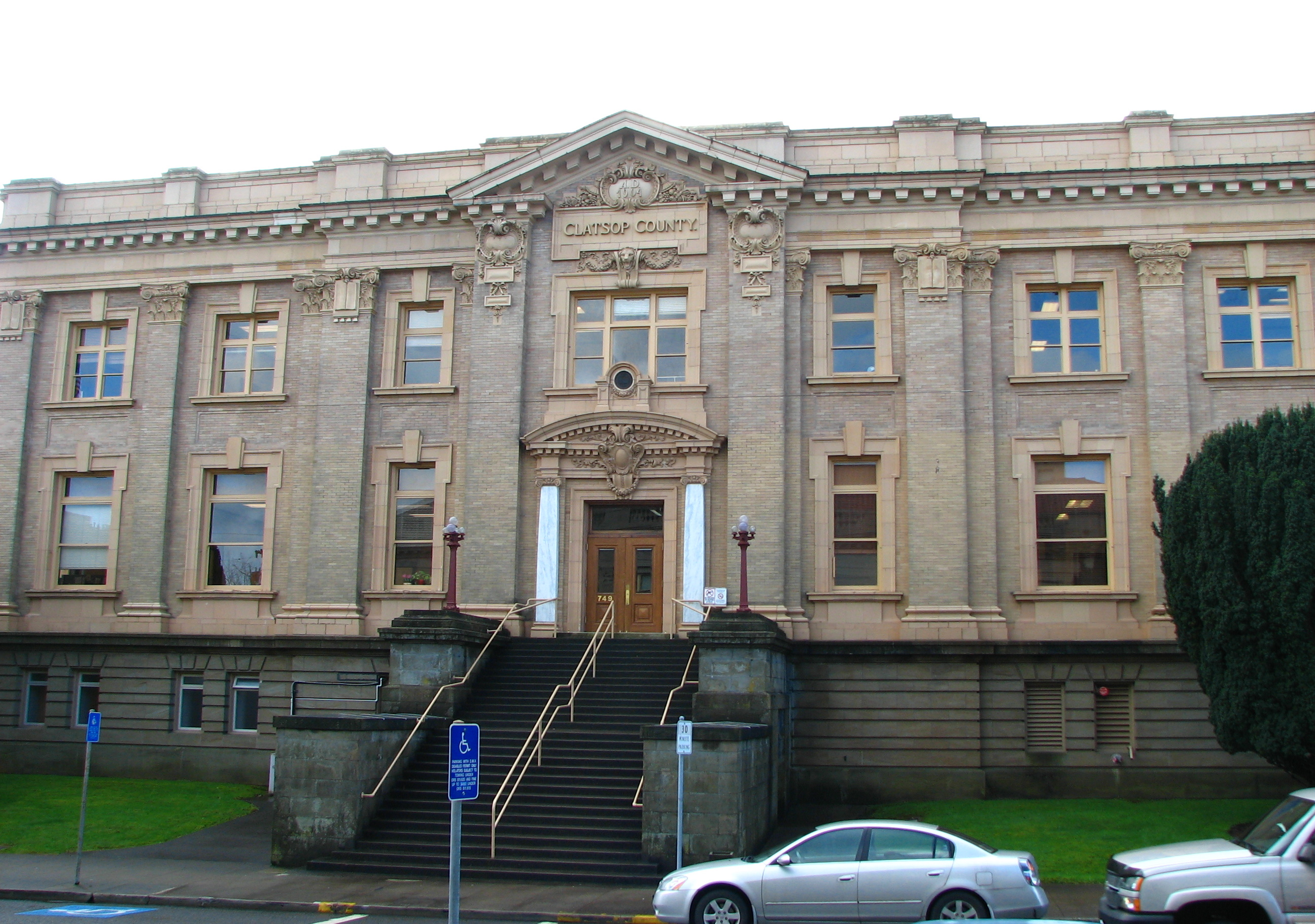
Clatsop County Courthouse, Astoria, Oregon

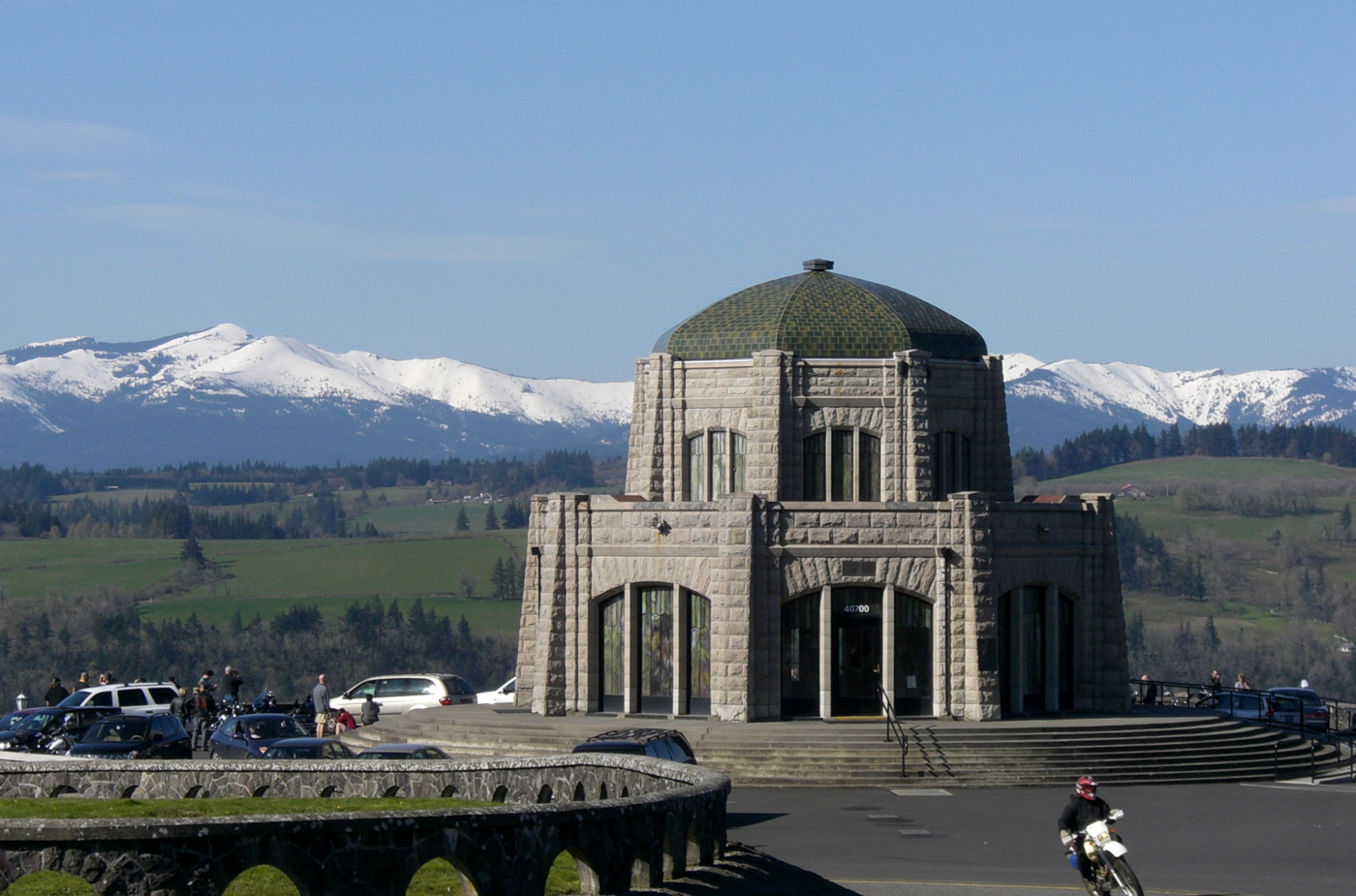
Vista House

Lazarus came to Portland in 1892 with a letter of introduction to a prominent citizen. He formed a partnership with William M. Ellicott that same year. Lazarus & Ellicott continued until 1895, after which Lazarus practiced alone until 1910. For a year he partnered with Morris H. Whitehouse and J. André Fouilhoux as Lazarus, Whitehouse & Fouilhoux. In 1911, he formed Lazarus & Logan with Frank Logan; the firm lasted until 1914. Lazarus then practiced alone for the rest of his career.

He was a member of the San Francisco chapter of the American Institute of Architects (AIA) and was elected a Fellow of the institute in 1895.

Early in his career, Lazarus designed many houses for notable Portlanders, especially among the city's Jewish community, like Bernard Goldsmith, Portland's mayor from 1869 to 1871. Lazarus' residential designs were predominantly shingle style, but with his characteristic features, including unusual shapes and extremely steeply pitched roofs.

In 1905, he designed the domed Palace of Agriculture for the Lewis and Clark Centennial Exposition in the Baroque style.

Lazarus also designed early alterations to Pioneer Courthouse, was the resident architect for the U.S. Customhouse, and designed the first Multnomah Athletic Club building at SW 10th and Yamhill streets, all in Portland.

When Oregon started licensing architects in 1919, he received license #21 under a grandfather clause.

=== Vista House ===
His most important work, completed in 1918, was the Vista House, an observatory that also serves as a memorial to Oregon pioneers and as a comfort station for travelers on the Historic Columbia River Highway. The building shows great sensitivity to its site at Crown Point in the Columbia River Gorge near Corbett, and is listed on the National Register of Historic Places (NRHP).

After completing the Vista House, Lazarus was engaged in a long, bitter dispute with the Oregon State Board of Control regarding his fees for both Vista House and his work at the Oregon State Hospital. The controversy brought him unfavorable attention in the press, and this may have harmed his career, as he did little important work after the incident.

== Works ==
- Frederick V. Holman House, Portland, 1892 (demolished 2016)
- George F. Heusner House, Portland, 1894 (NRHP)
- Apperson Hall, Oregon Agricultural College (now Oregon State University), Corvallis, 1898–1899 (NRHP contributing)
- Mitchell Playhouse (now the Gladys Valley Gymnastics Center), Oregon Agricultural College, Corvallis, 1898 (NRHP contributing)

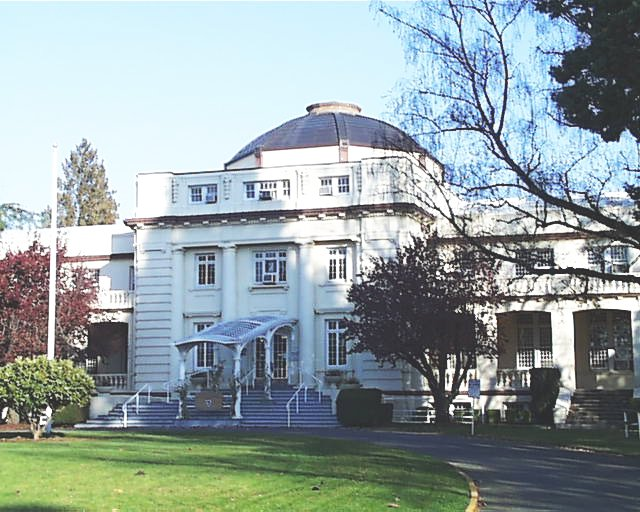
Oregon State Hospital Receiving Ward ("Dome Building")

- Morrow County Courthouse, Heppner, 1903 (NRHP)
- Ahavai Sholom Synagogue, Portland, 1904 (demolished 1978)
- Clatsop County Courthouse, Astoria, 1904–1907 (NRHP)
- John S. Bradley House, Portland, 1906 (NRHP)
- Taft Hotel, Portland, 1906 (NRHP)
- George L. Campbell House, Portland, 1910 (Lazarus, Whitehouse & Fouilhoux)
- J. C. Campbell Flats, Portland, 1910 (Lazarus, Whitehouse & Fouilhoux)
- Wickersham Apartments, Portland, 1910 (NRHP) (Lazarus, Whitehouse & Fouilhoux)
- Edward A. King House, Portland, 1910
- Oregon State Hospital Receiving Ward (the "Dome Building"), 1909 (NRHP contributing), and south wing of the "J Building", 1912 (demolished 2009), Salem
- Vista House, Corbett, 1918

== Later life, death and legacy ==
Lazarus was an avid horseman, artist, real estate entrepreneur, and ardent advocate for the architectural profession. In 1931, Lazarus' wife Fanny inherited a large fortune from a New York uncle. Lazarus died on October 2, 1939, in Portland, survived by his wife.

In 2011, Edward H. Teague, head of the Architecture and Allied Arts Library at the University of Oregon, and curator of the digital collection Building Oregon: Architecture of Oregon and the Pacific Northwest, presented his discovery of several works not previously attributed to Lazarus, including some that are still standing in Portland.
