= Clatsop County Courthouse =

Historic courthouse in Astoria, Oregon, U.S.

- U.S. National Register of Historic Places
- U.S. Historic district – Contributing property
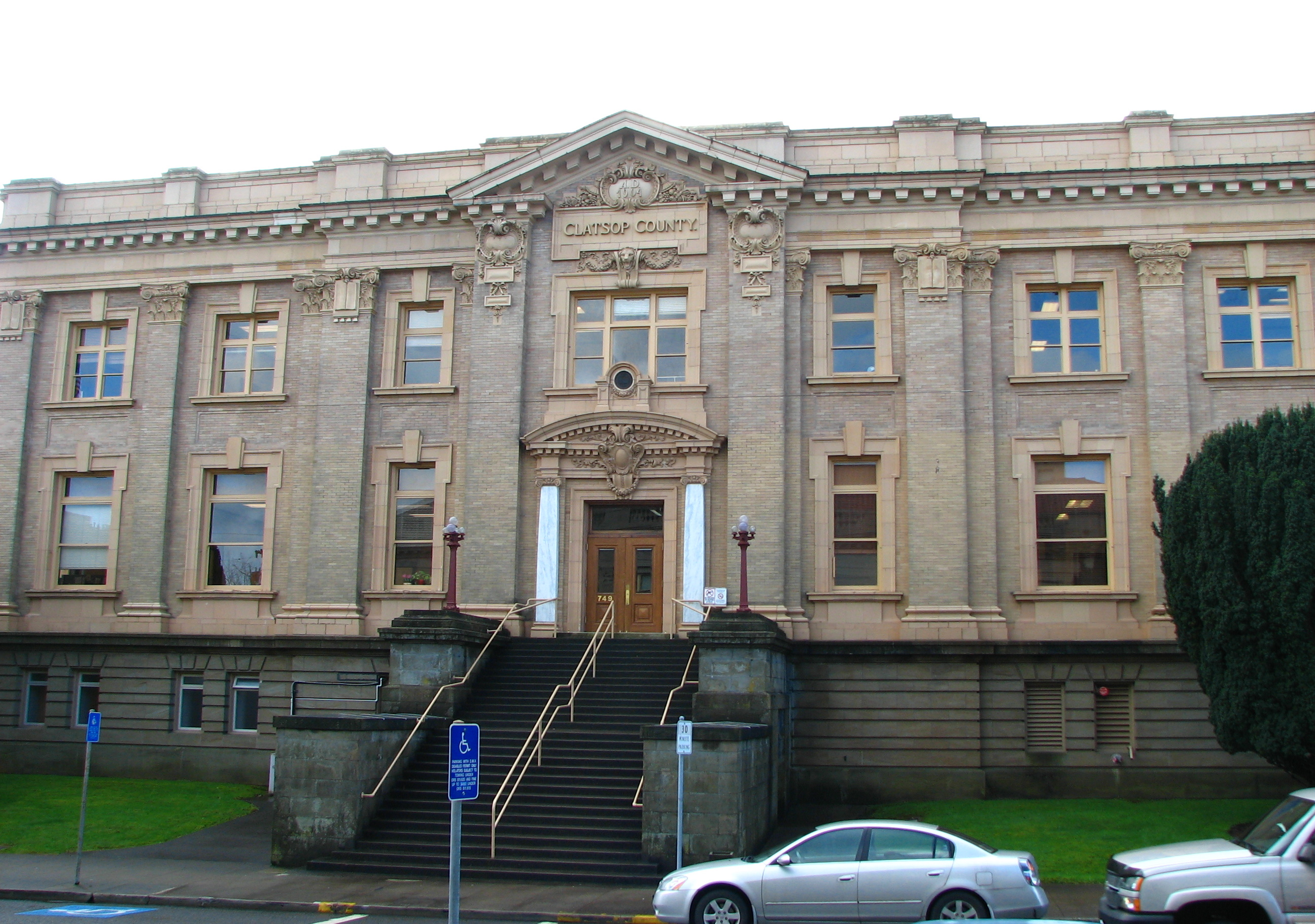
- The Clatsop County Courthouse in 2010

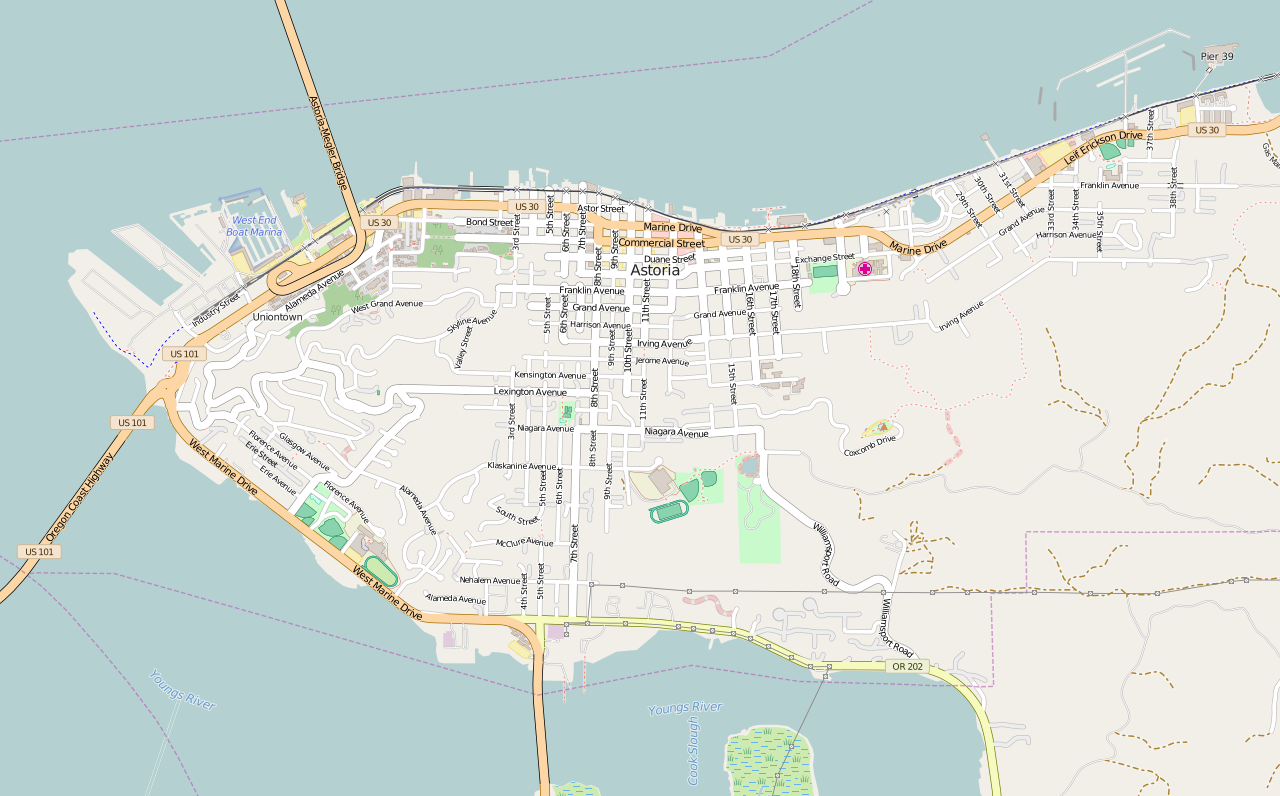
- Location within Astoria OR
- Location: 749 Commercial Street; Astoria, Oregon
- Coordinates: 46°11′20″N 123°50′07″W
- Area: Less than 1 acre (0.40 ha)
- Built: 1908
- Built by: Hastie & Dougan
- Architect: Edgar M. Lazarus
- Architectural style: American Renaissance
- Part of: Astoria Downtown Historic District (ID98000631)
- NRHP reference No.: 84002954
- Added to NRHP: April 5, 1984

The Clatsop County Courthouse is a historic courthouse in Astoria, Clatsop County, Oregon, United States. The building was listed on the National Register of Historic Places in 1984.

== See also ==
- National Register of Historic Places listings in Clatsop County, Oregon
