= John B. Yeon State Scenic Corridor =

State park in the U.S. state of Oregon

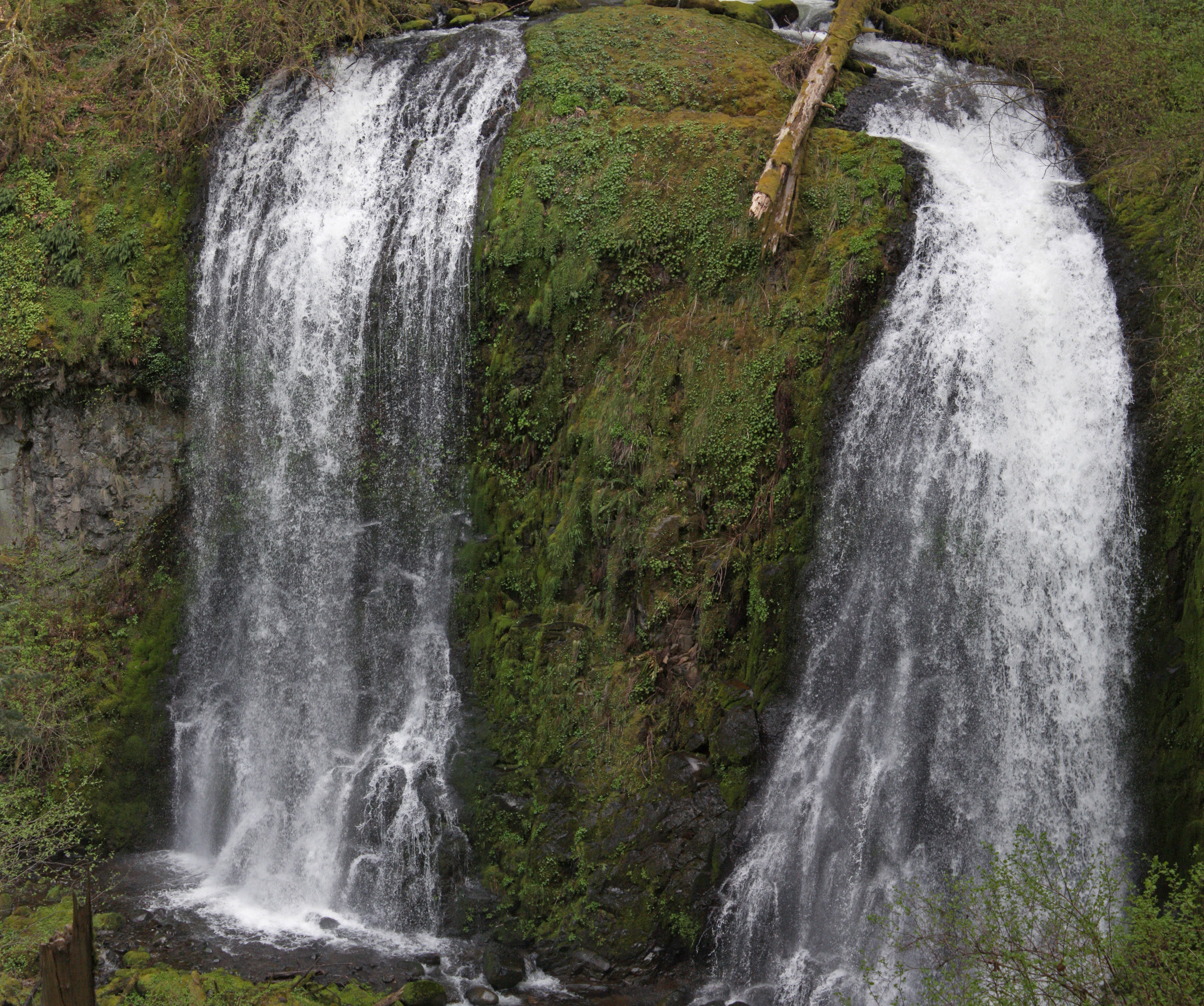
- Upper McCord Creek Falls in John B. Yeon State Scenic Corridor

- Location within Oregon Location within the United States
- Type: Public, state
- Location: Multnomah County, Oregon
- Nearest city: Troutdale
- Coordinates: 45°37′10″N 121°59′12″W
- Operator: Oregon Parks and Recreation Department

John B. Yeon State Scenic Corridor is a state park in the U.S. state of Oregon, administered by the Oregon Parks and Recreation Department. It is located about 35 miles east of Portland in the Columbia Gorge. It is named in honor of John B. Yeon, one of the principal financiers of the Historic Columbia River Highway U.S. Route 30 which was constructed between 1913 and 1922. Located in the Columbia River Gorge National Scenic Area, the park features hiking trails that access some of the nearby waterfalls, including Elowah Falls.

== See also ==
- List of Oregon state parks
- Wahe Falls
