= Elowah Falls =

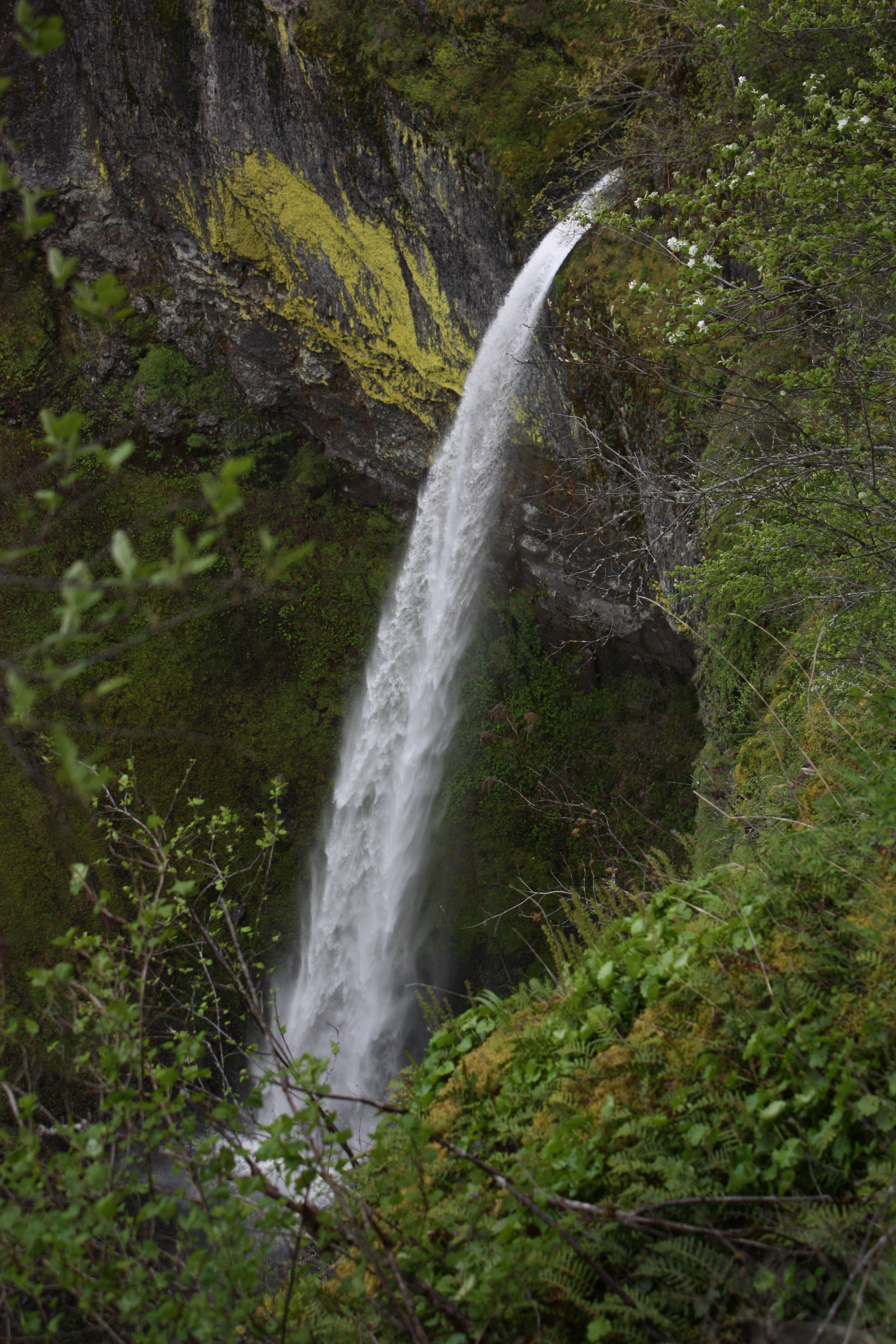
- Elowah Falls in the spring
- Interactive map of Elowah Falls
- Location: Columbia River Gorge
- Coordinates: 45.61829°N 121.96701°W
- Type: Plunge
- Elevation: 384 ft (117 m)
- Total height: 213 ft (65 m)
- Average flow rate: 75 cu ft/s (2.1 m^{3}/s)

Elowah Falls, also called McCord Creek Falls, is a 213-foot waterfall on the Columbia River Gorge, Multnomah County, Oregon, United States. Elowah Falls is one of several waterfalls along McCord Creek. The Creek and the waterfall are within the limits of the John B. Yeon State Scenic Corridor.

The name of the waterfall carried the name of the creek that forms it: McCord Falls. In 1915 the Mazamas successfully had the falls renamed to Elowah. The meaning of the term is unknown.

== Description ==
The waterfall is formed as McCord Creek is forced into a narrow channel by sheer cliffs and shoots at high velocity into a natural amphitheater of layered basalt. Lichens and mosses are very common, covering about 80 percent of the ground surface under and around the vascular plants.

== See also ==
- List of waterfalls in Oregon
