= The Mark Spencer Hotel =

Hotel in Portland, Oregon, U.S.

Mark Spencer Hotel
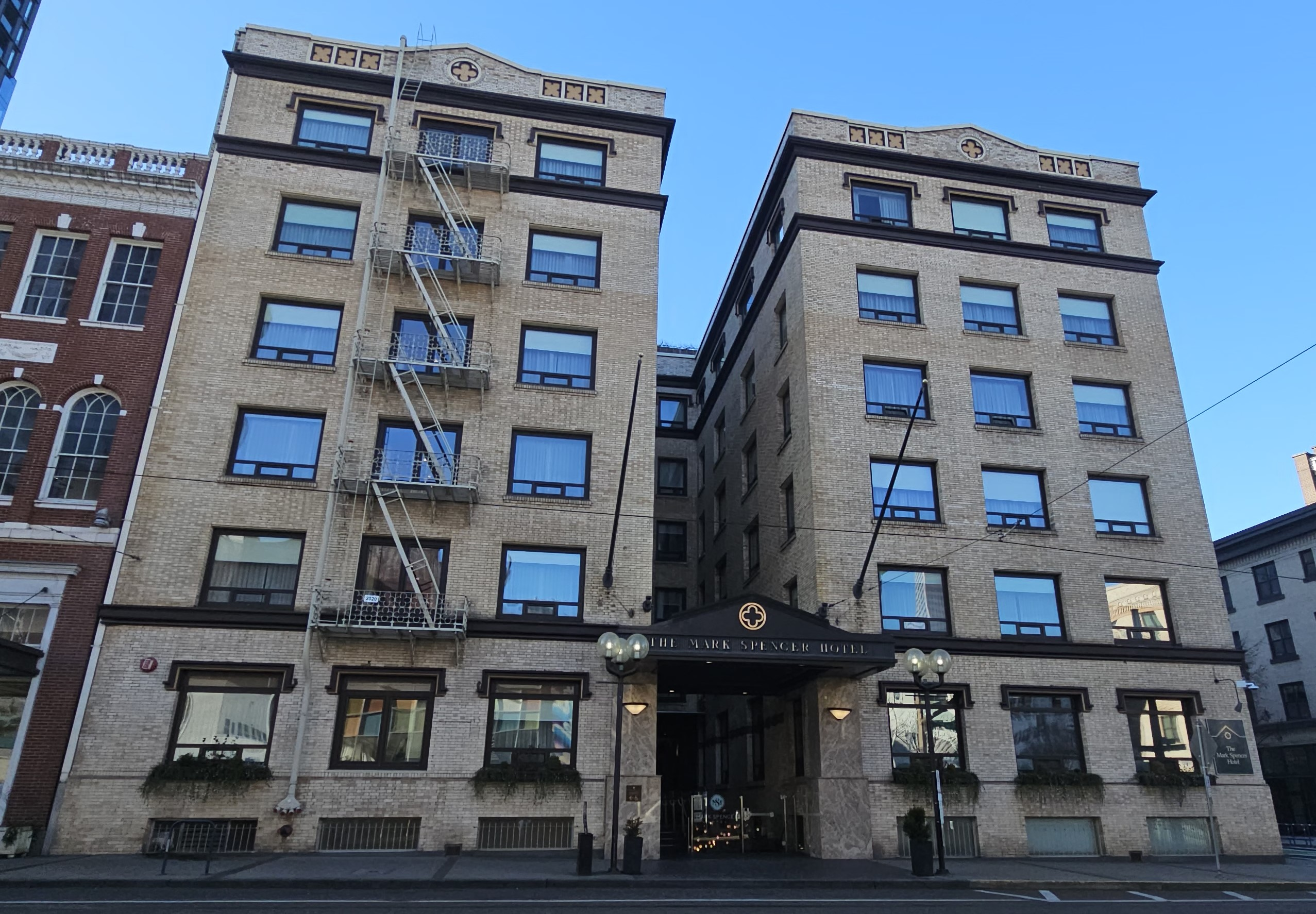

- Location within Portland, Oregon

General information
- Location: Portland, Oregon, United States
- Coordinates: 45°31′20″N 122°40′57″W

The Mark Spencer Hotel is a hotel in Portland, Oregon. The hotel opened in 1907 as the Hotel Nortonia and has hosted many notable people, including Louis Armstrong, Sammy Davis Jr., Lionel Hampton, Spike Jones, and Mel Tormé.
