= Frank Branch Riley =

American attorney and public speaker (1875–1975)

- Born: August 4, 1875; Osceola, Iowa, U.S.
- Died: February 23, 1975 (aged 99); Portland, Oregon, U.S.
- Education: A.B.
- Alma mater: Stanford University, Harvard Law School
- Occupations: Attorney and lecturer
- Known for: Oregon's unofficial ambassador, 1918–1964

Frank Branch Riley (1875–1975) was an attorney based in Portland, Oregon, who was nationally known as a public speaker. From 1918 until the mid-1960s, he traveled around the United States presenting illustrated lectures about the scenery and attractions of the Pacific Northwest, encouraging people to visit or move there. He was called Oregon's "unofficial ambassador".

== Early life and education ==
Riley was born August 4, 1875, in Osceola, Iowa, to Edward Francis Riley and Martha Smith Riley. His family moved to Portland in 1891, and Riley graduated from Portland High School (now Lincoln High School) in 1893. He studied at the Columbia School of Oratory in Chicago and was its sole graduate in the class of 1894. He returned to Portland to take college-preparatory courses at the Portland Academy.

He then attended Stanford University, graduating in 1900 with a bachelor of arts degree in economics. He attended Harvard Law School from 1900 to 1901, and returned to Portland to practice law with his father. He joined the Oregon Bar in 1902.

== Public speaking ==
Riley earned a reputation as a "silver-tongued orator". He was invited to give public speeches at local events such as the 1917 opening of the Interstate Bridge between Portland and Vancouver, Washington, and the 1918 dedication of Vista House in the Columbia River Gorge.

In 1918, sponsored by local business interests, Riley began to deliver lectures around the United States to boost travel to the Pacific Northwest. His venues included universities, chambers of commerce, and civic and recreational clubs. His talks had titles like "The Lure of the Great Northwest" and "The East is Coming West".

His typical talk ran for about 70 minutes, illustrated by as many as 375 hand-tinted lantern slides of Northwest scenery. He traveled with his own projectionist and a special projector that could fade images from one slide into the next.

This description of sunset and alpenglow on Mount Hood, taken from his talk in 1920 at Chicago's South Shore Country Club, gives a flavor of Riley's style:

The pink deepens into flame, and old Hood seems burning with a many-colored fire. Then the blue shadows, ever darkening, creep up the long slope and with velvet fingers hide the warm light. The old mountain lifts himself up to catch the last color blessing of the dying day. And now in the light of the keen, cold stars, he towers bereft, like a ghost, a phantom in the night!

As he spoke, his slides would cross-fade, one to into the next, showing his audience the changes in light on the mountain that Riley was describing.

His audiences received his talks enthusiastically. In 1918, he spoke at about 60 venues. By 1922, he spoke at almost 100, reaching a combined annual audience of tens of thousands. After Riley spoke at the City Club of Philadelphia, a reviewer wrote: "We feel that Frank Branch Riley, and the 'Lure of the Great Northwest' should, from now on, be an annual attraction. For the third time, this gifted speaker has held a large audience spell-bound, and we already look forward to having him with us again next year."

== Other activities ==
Riley was an outdoorsman and mountain climber. In announcing a talk to be given at Yale University, the Yale Daily News declared, "Mr. Riley has climbed most of the highest and wildest peaks in North America and has gained a reputation as a mountaineer practically unsurpassed on this continent." He was a charter member of the Mazamas mountaineering club and served, around 1916, as its president. He was the featured speaker at the club's annual banquets in 1935, 1942, 1943, 1953, and 1968.

He was an advocate of improving roadways. He promoted building of the Pacific Highway through Washington and Oregon and spoke at the ceremony that marked that the completion of the highway from Vancouver, British Columbia, to the California–Oregon border. He served as vice president of the Pacific Highway Association.

An article in The Harvard Crimson described him as an expert on the national parks and an accomplished poet and musician.

== Death ==
Riley died on February 23, 1975, in Portland.
