= John B. Yeon =

Canadian businessman

Jean Baptiste Yeon (also known as John B. Yeon) (24 April 1865 – 15 October 1928) was a Canada West-born, timber magnate who was a prominent citizen of Portland, Oregon, United States.

Yeon was one of the principal financiers of the Columbia River Highway. The John B. Yeon State Scenic Corridor was named for him, as was Yeon Avenue, which carries U.S. Route 30 through the Northwest Industrial neighborhood of Portland, Oregon.

He financed the construction of the 1911 Yeon Building in downtown Portland, and supervised the construction of the Vista House at Crown Point in 1918.

Yeon was the father of Portland architect and philanthropist John Yeon. Both are interred in the family vault at Portland Memorial Mausoleum.

The family name is pronounced "yawn", not "yee-on".
