= Wickersham Apartments =

Historic building in Portland, Oregon, U.S.

Coordinates: 45.5259°N 122.6892°W

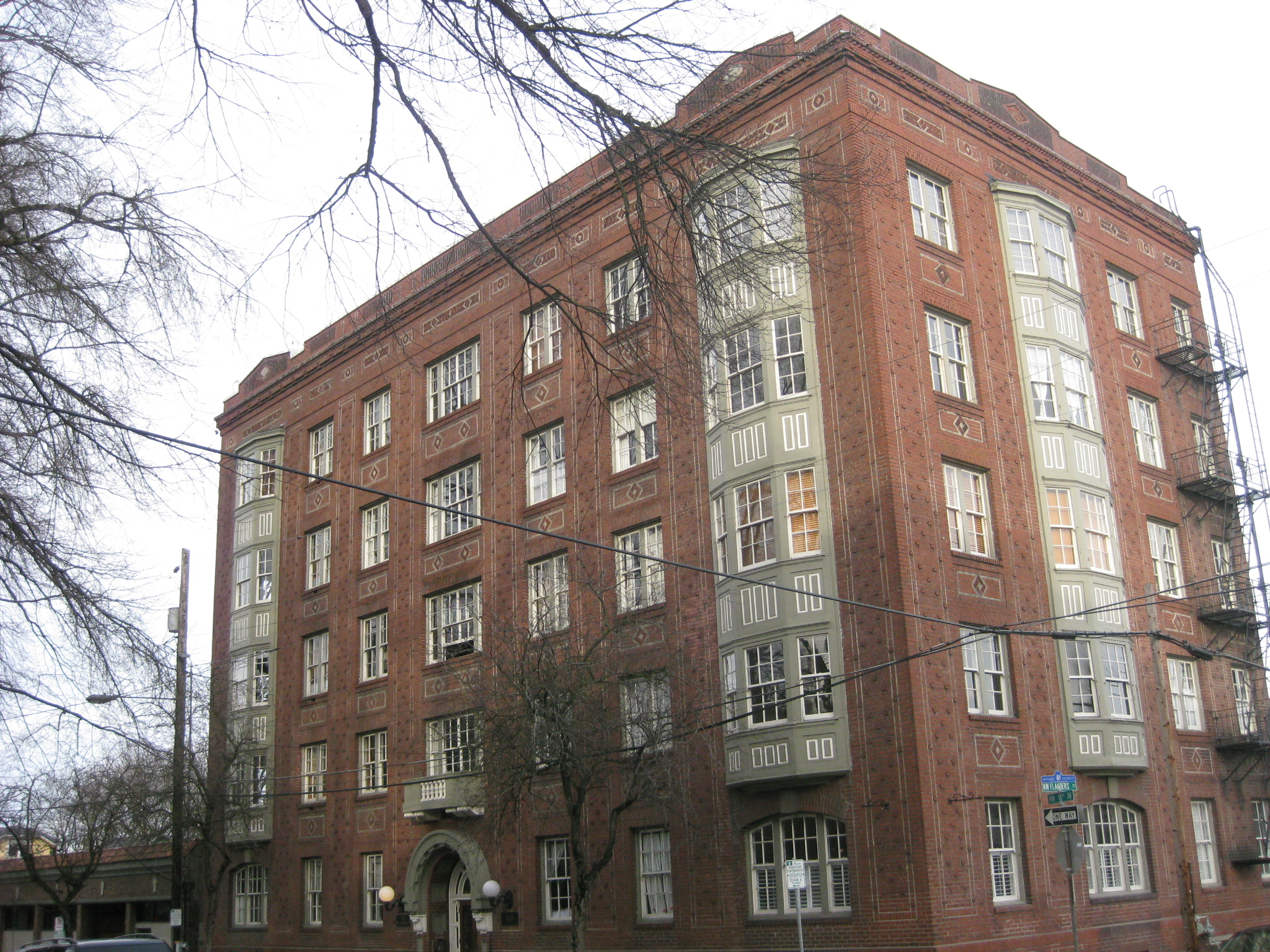
The building's exterior in 2010

The Wickersham Apartments is a historic building Portland, Oregon, United States. Located in Northwest Portland's Northwest District, it is listed on the National Register of Historic Places.

== See also ==
- National Register of Historic Places listings in Northwest Portland, Oregon
