= Contact II =

Sculpture in Portland, Oregon

- The sculpture in 2015
- Artist: Alexander Liberman
- Year: 1972
- Type: Sculpture
- Medium: Steel
- Dimensions: 2.1 m × 2.4 m × 1.5 m (7 ft × 8 ft × 5 ft)
- Location: Portland, Oregon, United States; 45°31′44″N 122°40′54″W
- Owner: City of Portland and Multnomah County Public Art Collection courtesy of the Regional Arts & Culture Council

Contact II is an outdoor 1972 abstract sculpture by Russian American artist Alexander Liberman, located at Jamison Square in the Pearl District, Portland, Oregon.

== Description ==
The painted steel sculpture measures 7 feet (2.1 m) x 8 feet (2.4 m) x 5 feet (1.5 m) and was donated by Ed Cauduro in 2002 in memory of his parents Ernest and Teresa Cauduro. It is part of the City of Portland and Multnomah County Public Art Collection courtesy of the Regional Arts & Culture Council. According to The Culture Trip, Contact II is "representative of Liberman's oeuvre as it is painted in red and its form centres on a circular shape, both of which were often repeated in his works".

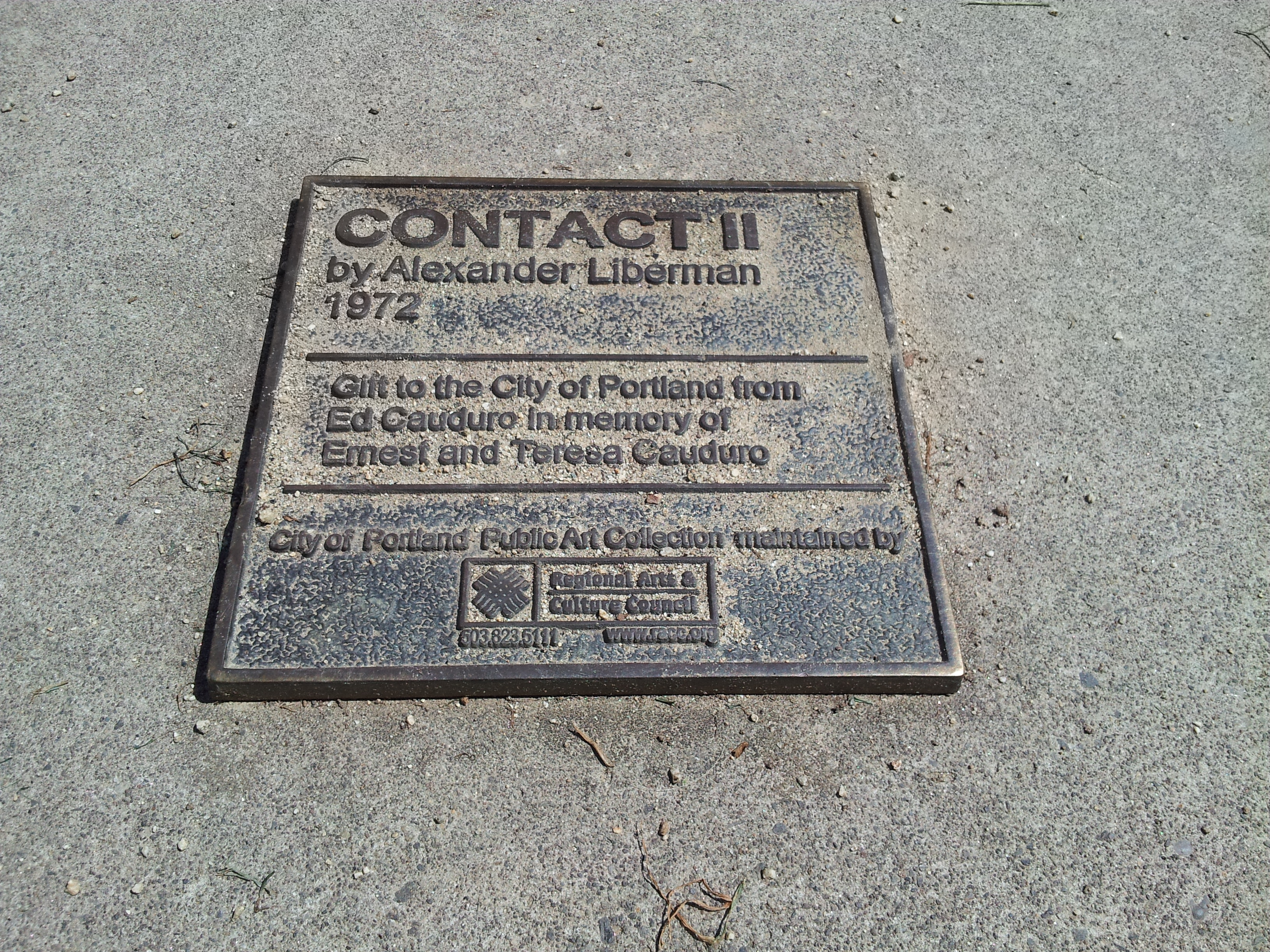
Plaque

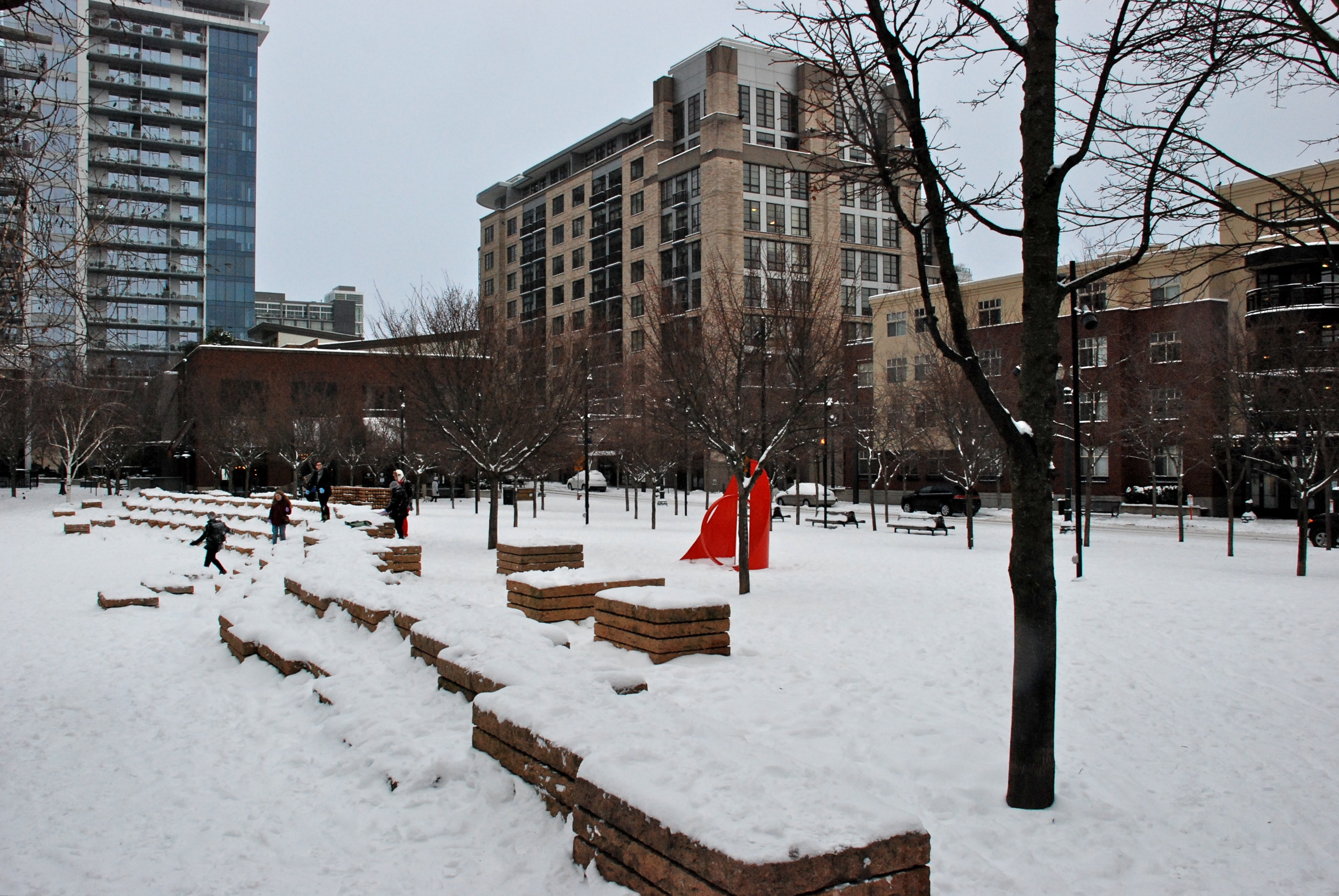
The sculpture in February 2014

== See also ==
- 1972 in art
