= Art in the Pearl =

Annual festival in Portland, Oregon, U.S.

- Logo
- Status: Active
- Frequency: Annually
- Venue: North Park Blocks
- Location: Portland, Oregon
- Country: United States
- Inaugurated: 1996
- Website: artinthepearl.com

Art in the Pearl is an annual arts and crafts festival in Portland, Oregon, United States. It is held in the North Park Blocks, in northwest Portland's Pearl District.

== Description and history ==
Established in 1996, Art in the Pearl takes place in the North Park Blocks on Labor Day weekend. Attended by thousands of people, it is the city's largest outdoor art fair, according to Portland Monthly. The event features works by approximately 100 artists, as well as entertainment, food, furniture, jewelry, music, and activities for children. Artworks include ceramics, paintings, and photography, as well as art made from fiber, glass, and metal.

The 30th festival was held in 2026.

== Reception ==
The fair "has been labeled one of the best arts and crafts festivals in the country", according to Willamette Week.

== See also ==
- Culture of Portland, Oregon
- List of artists and art institutions in Portland, Oregon
- List of festivals in the United States
