= Janken (restaurant) =

Asian restaurant in Portland, Oregon, U.S.

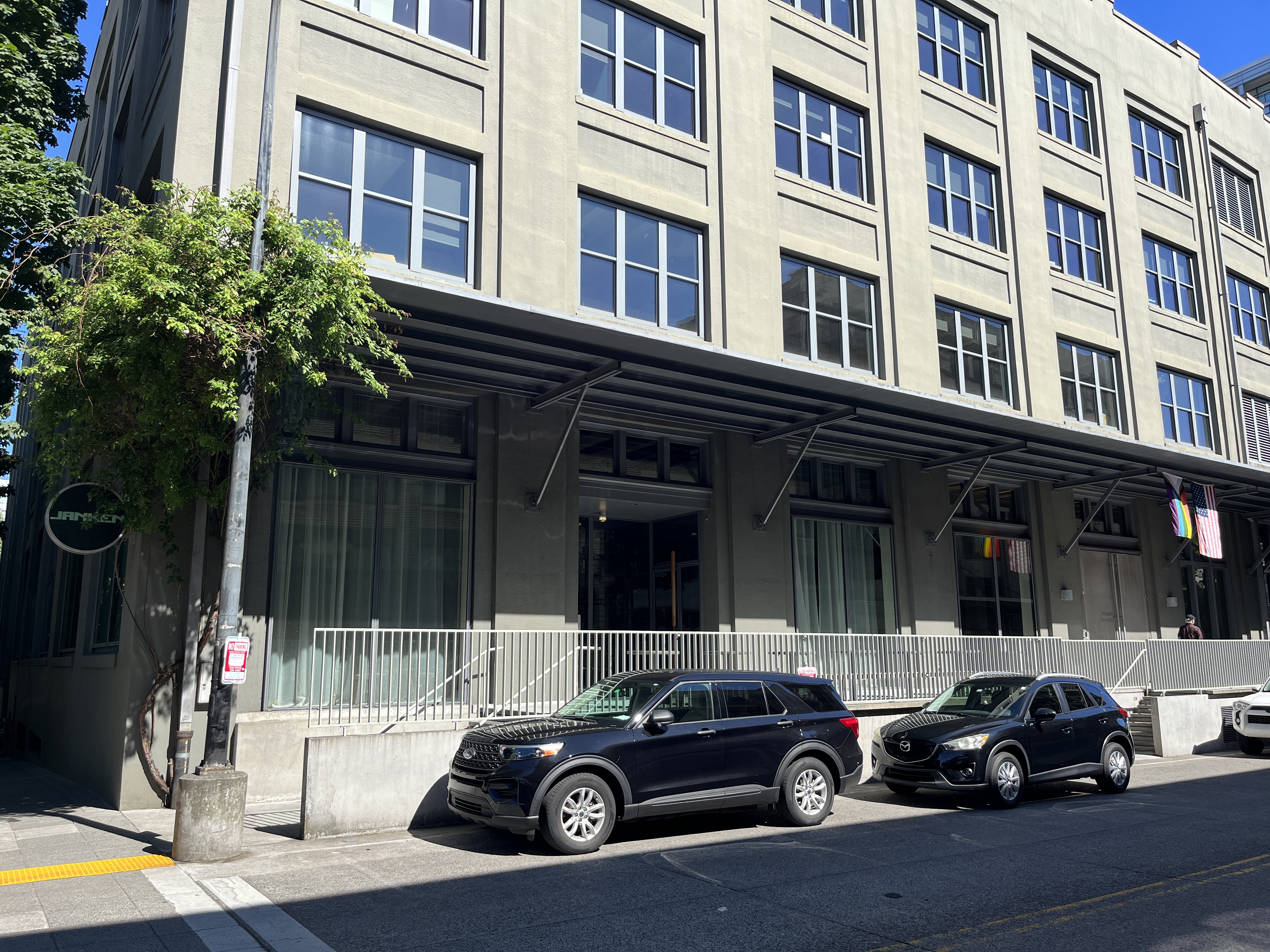
- The restaurant's exterior, 2023
- Interactive map of Janken

Restaurant information
- Head chef: Rodrigo Ochoa
- Food type: Asian
- Location: 250 Northwest 13th Avenue, Portland, Multnomah, Oregon, 97209, United States
- Coordinates: 45.5249°N 122.6841°W
- Website: jankenrestaurant.com

Janken is an Asian restaurant in Portland, Oregon, United States. It opened in northwest Portland's Pearl District in 2022.

== Description ==
The 9,000-square-foot pan-Asian restaurant Janken operates at the intersection of 13th Avenue and Everett Street in northwest Portland's Pearl District. The interior has a large artificial cherry tree. Tables are made of quartz and white oak. Eater Portland described the dining room as "elegant".

=== Menu ===
Janken serves Chinese, Japanese, and Korean cuisine. The menu includes caviar, peking duck, sushi, Korean braised short ribs, hamachi with crispy rice, and wagyu gyoza. Dessert options include chocolate cake, strawberry bingsu, and matcha tiramisu with ladyfingers and rum mascarpone cream.

Among cocktails are the Pineapple Expressm, which has mezcal infused with grilled pineapple, and The Rose City, which has peach blossom vodka, peach rooibos tea, Prosecco, lemon juice, and orange syrup.

== History ==
Janken opened on November 19, 2022, in the space that previously housed the restaurant Bluehour. Rodrigo Ochoa is the executive chef and co-owner. For Christmas Eve service in 2022, the restaurant served caviar with blinis and latkes, steak tartare with shaved black truffle, peking duck, and A5 wagyu beef with crispy rice.

== Reception ==
Eater Portland included Janken in a 2025 overview of the best bars and restaurants in the Pearl District.
