= North Park Blocks =

Public park in Portland, Oregon, U.S.

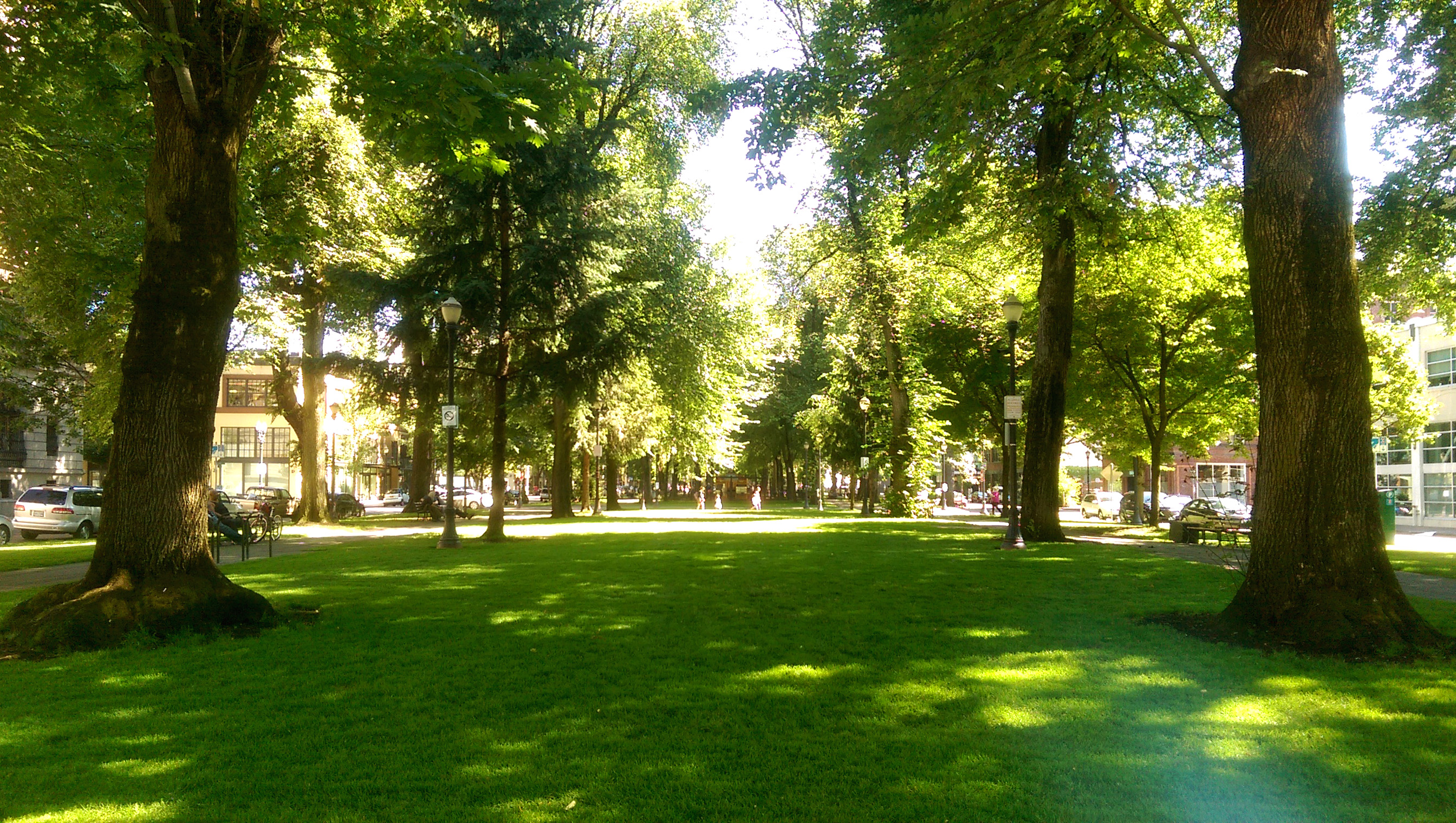
- View of the Park Blocks, July 2016
- Interactive map of North Park Blocks
- Type: Urban park
- Location: NW Park Ave. from Ankeny St. to Glisan St. Portland, Oregon
- Coordinates: 45°31′28″N 122°40′43″W
- Area: 3.11 acres (1.26 ha)
- Operator: Portland Parks & Recreation
- Status: Open 5 a.m. to 9 p.m. daily

The North Park Blocks form a city park in the Pearl District, Portland, Oregon, in the United States. Most of the park is in northwest Portland (north of Burnside Street), but one block (Ankeny Square) is in southwest Portland (south of Burnside).

== Description and history ==
Captain John H. Couch deeded the five blocks to the city in 1865, and they were officially platted for a municipal park in 1869. An ordinance was passed in 1904, setting aside one park block for women and children. In 1906, another block was added for a children's playground. The playground was divided into a boys' playground and a small children's and girls' playground. Use of the North Park Blocks declined, especially as the 1924 zoning code did not preserve residential uses near them.

By the 1940s, the North Park Blocks area was decidedly neglected. A problem with the homeless and aggressive panhandlers led to Daisy Kingdom and the U.S. Customs House to hire security guards, and park sprinklers were set to intermittently spray sleepers. In 1989, the problem was worse; that year the local Montessori School found drug users and discarded needles in the city playground.

In 2002, Chinese foundry owner Huo Baozhu donated Da Tung and Xi'an Bao Bao, full-size bronze reproductions of Shang dynasty elephant statues, to Portland. The city placed them on the North Park Blocks where children could interact with them.

In recent years, the North Park Blocks have experienced a renaissance. Upscale condominiums and creative commercial buildings have replaced vacant or underutilized buildings. One major project was the 2014–15 major renovation of the historic 511 Federal Building, a former federal post office built in 1916–18, to become the new main campus of the Pacific Northwest College of Art (PNCA).

Situated in front of the PNCA, the sculpture Memory 99, designed by Lee Kelly, was the first step in a plan to expand the North Park Blocks to include the block between NW Glisan St. and NW Hoyt St. The Broadway Corridor Project, which began construction in 2024, includes the addition of a second new North Park Block between NW Hoyt St. and NW Lovejoy St. Updating the North Park Blocks would include a two way bike lane along the west side, as part of the Green Loop.

The North Park Blocks host the annual Art in the Pearl.

== See also ==
- Dog Bowl (2002), a sculpture in the park designed by William Wegman
- South Park Blocks
