= Block 17 =

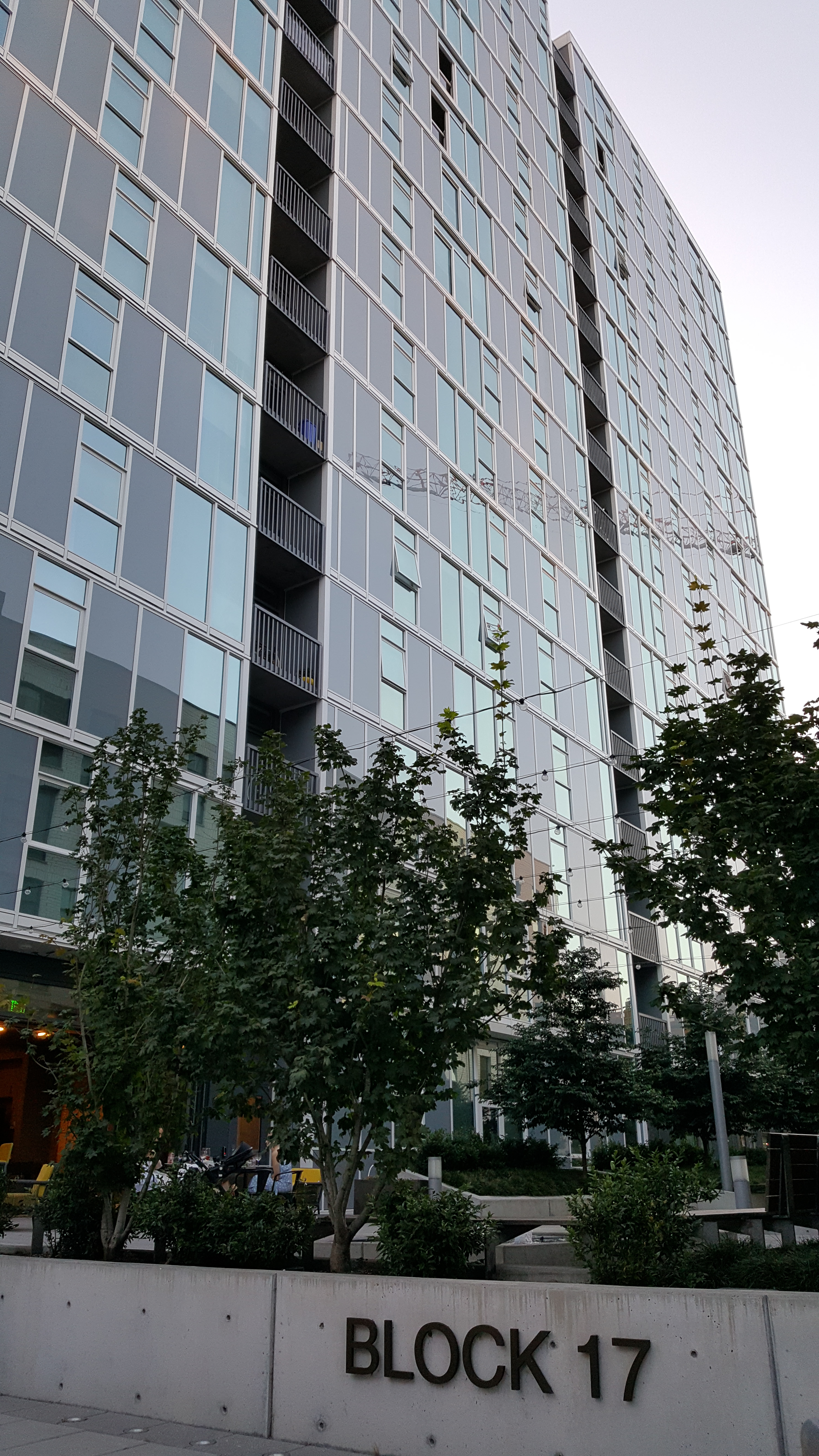
- The building's exterior in 2017
- Interactive map of the Block 17 area

General information
- Location: Portland, Oregon, United States
- Coordinates: 45.532222°N 122.682778°W

Block 17 is a luxury high-rise apartment building in Portland, Oregon's Pearl District. Opened in 2015, its 16 stories contain a total 285 units. With some units sold for up to $3.74 per square foot, they are some of the city's most expensive. Some of its units are rented as hotel rooms, in violation of existing regulations and to the dissatisfaction of renters.
