= The Cosmopolitan =

The Cosmopolitan may refer to:

- Cosmopolitan (magazine), the original name of the magazine in the 1880s was The Cosmopolitan.
- Cosmopolitan of Las Vegas, a hotel/casino/condo in Las Vegas, Nevada that opened in December 2010
- Cosmopolitan on the Park, or simply "the Cosmopolitan", a skyscraper in Portland, Oregon, United States

== See also ==
- Cosmopolitan (disambiguation)
- The Cosmopolitans, American new wave band (1975–1982)
