= Centennial Mills =

Building complex in Portland, Oregon, U.S.

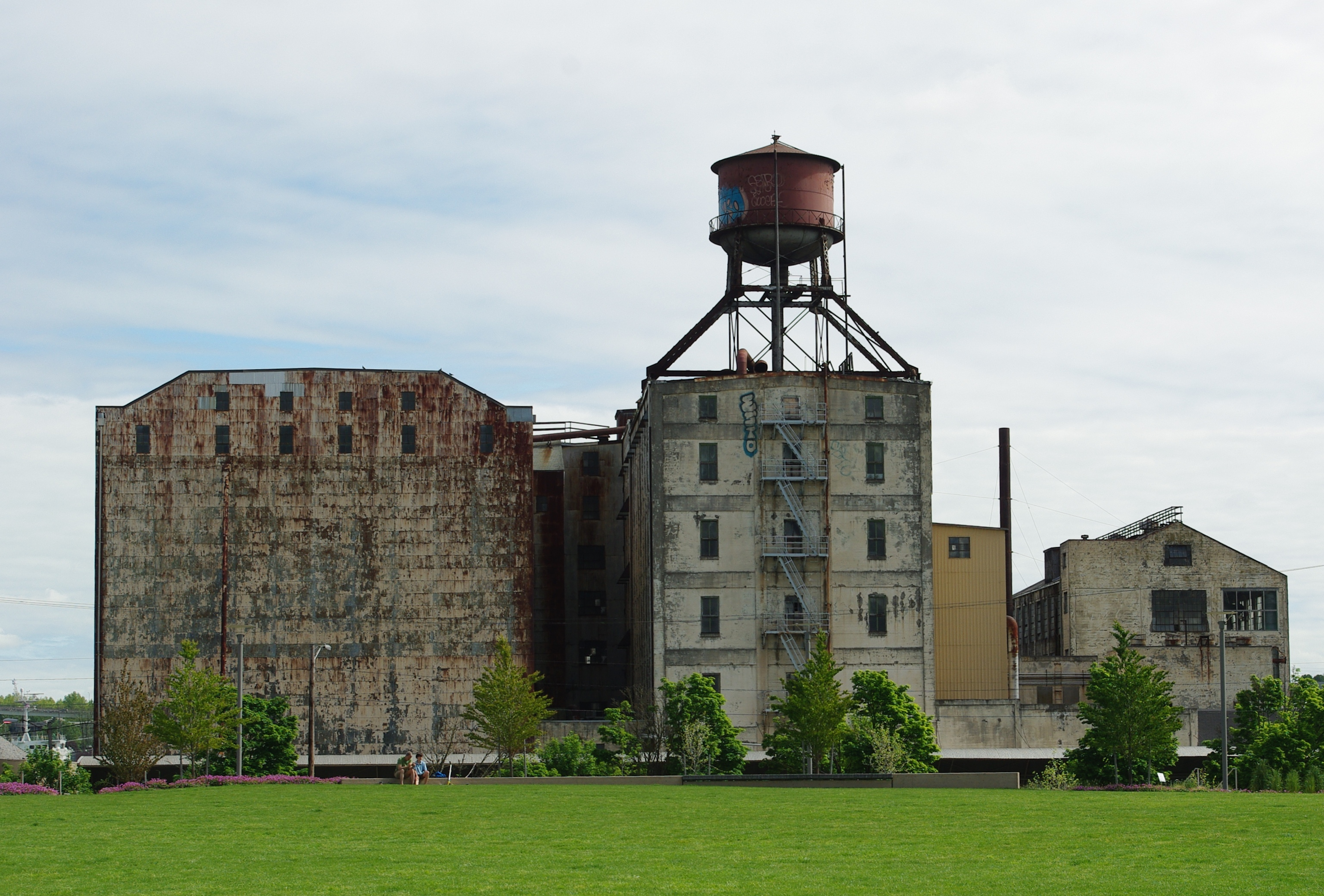
- Centennial Mills, 2014

- Location within Portland, Oregon
- Former names: Crown Mills

General information
- Location: Portland, Oregon, United States
- Coordinates: 45.5339°N 122.6808°W

Design and construction
- Known for: Mill complex

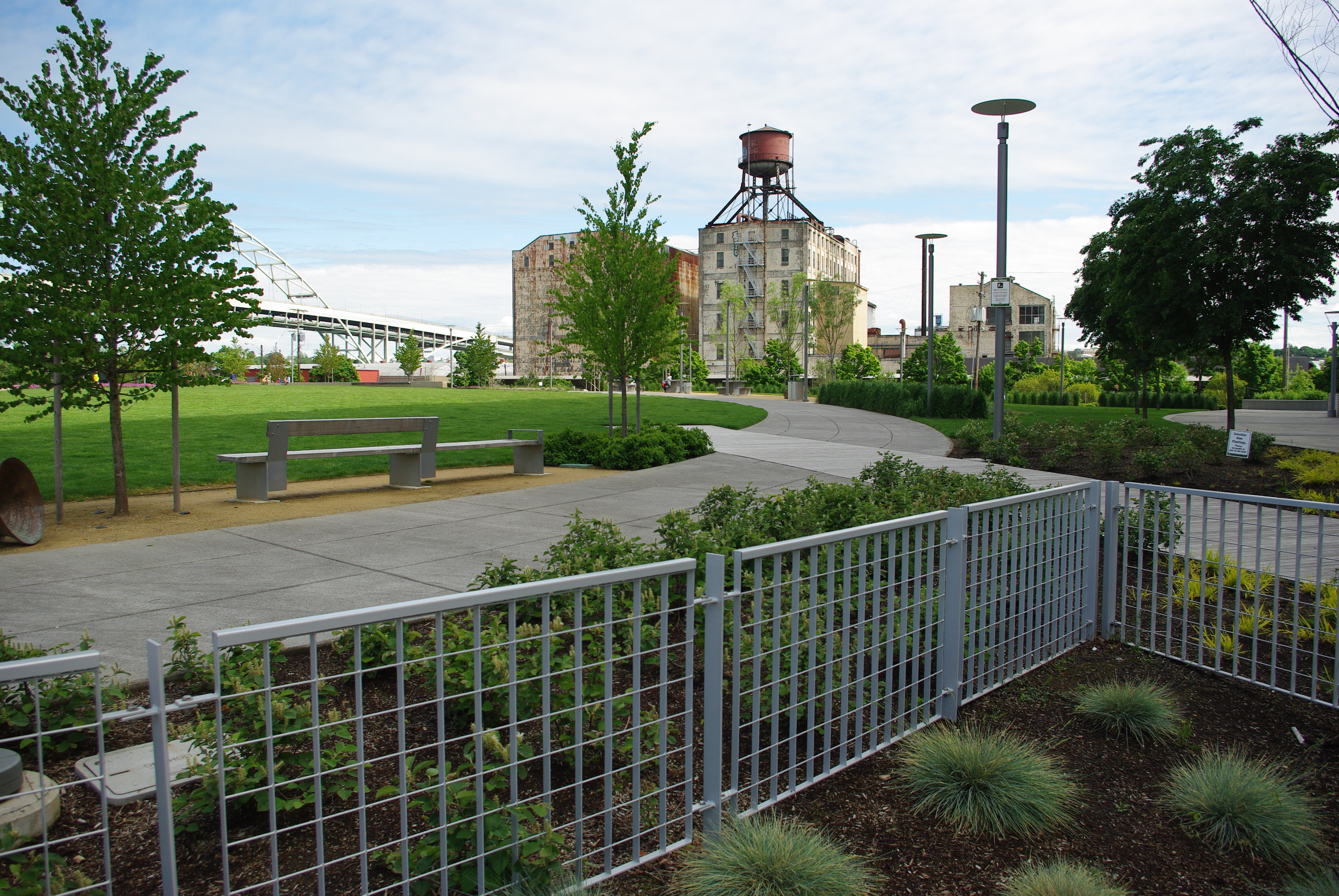
View of Centennial Mills from The Fields Park in 2014

The Centennial Mills, originally known as the Crown Mills was a flour mill that was originally a complex of twelve buildings along the Willamette River in Portland, Oregon's Pearl District, in the United States. The mill operated from 1910 to 2000. Most buildings were demolished between 2015 and 2016. Multiple development plans of the defunct mill were proposed, but none materialized. The remaining building was demolished in 2026 after it was damaged in a fire.

== History ==
The site previously housed a flour mill, which operated from 1910 to 2000.

Following World War II, the mill was sold to Centennial Flouring Mills, of Tacoma, Washington and renamed from Crown Mills to Centennial Mills in 1949. The mill was modernized in 1962.

In 1981, it was acquired by Archer Daniels Midland.

The Portland Development Commission, later renamed Prosper Portland, acquired Centennial Mills in 2000. The buildings were slated for demolition, except for the flour and feed mill buildings.

In 2013, Randy Gragg of Portland Monthly described the site as "one of the most tantalizing and problematic development sites in the region". Between summer 2015 and fall 2016, most of the buildings on the property were demolished. Multiple developers abandoned redevelopment efforts for the site.

In 2024, Prosper Portland sold the property to private investors. During the city's ownership of the property, $19 million had been spent on the property, including acquisition and demolition costs. Since the sale, there were frequent reports to emergency dispatchers about squatters and small fires at the property. Fire department noted presence of squatters and 15 beds in the building when they responded to a medical call in June 2026.

One of the buildings, previously a warehouse, suffered a major fire damage in August 2026 which compromised the integrity of the building's structure, posing a collapse risk to the surrounding area. The mill was demolished the same month. The fire resulted in a temporary closure of the nearby The Fields Park for about seven weeks.

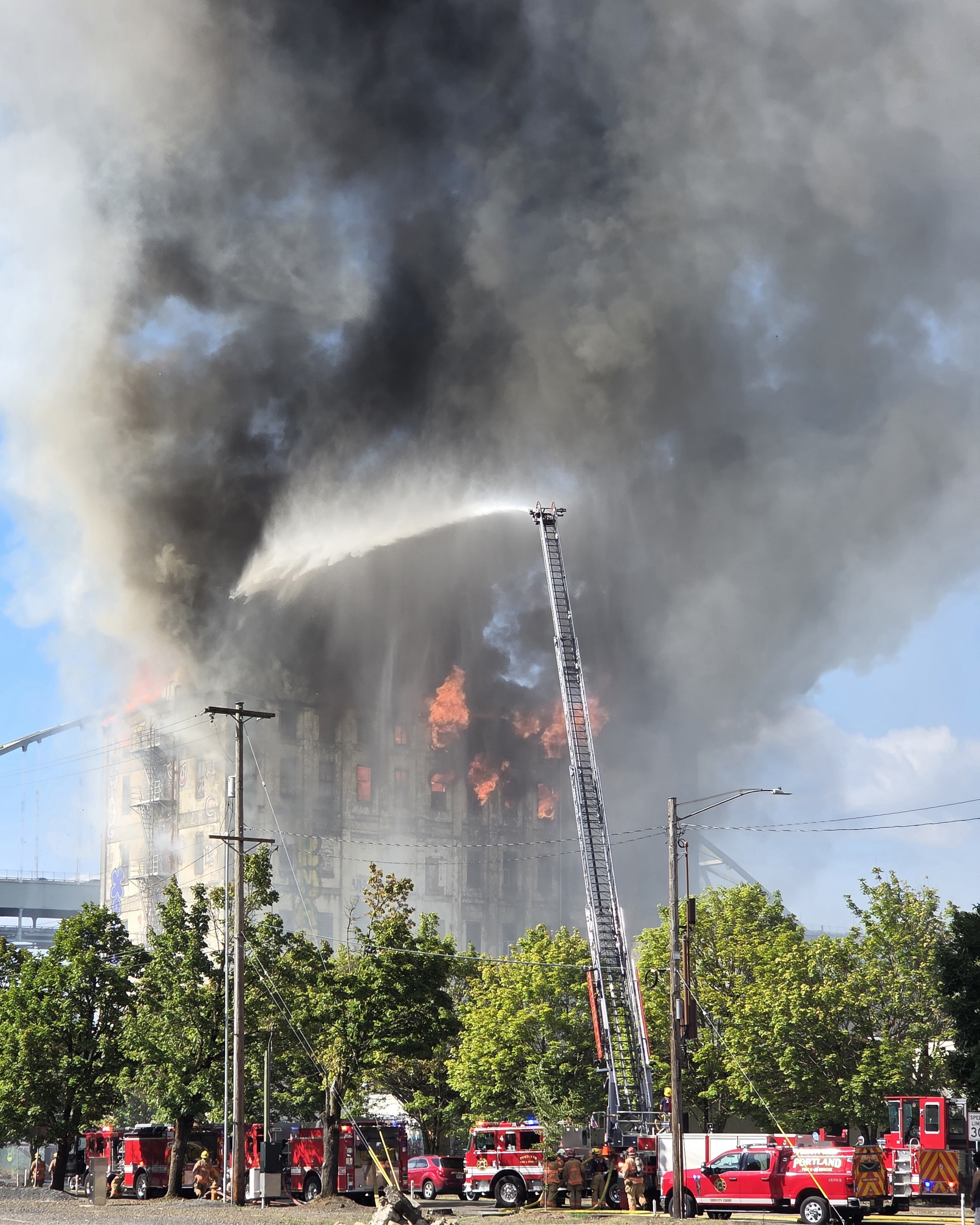
Centennial Mills on fire in August 2026
