= Vista Pearl =

Building in Portland, Oregon, U.S.

Coordinates: 45.53328°N 122.68301°W

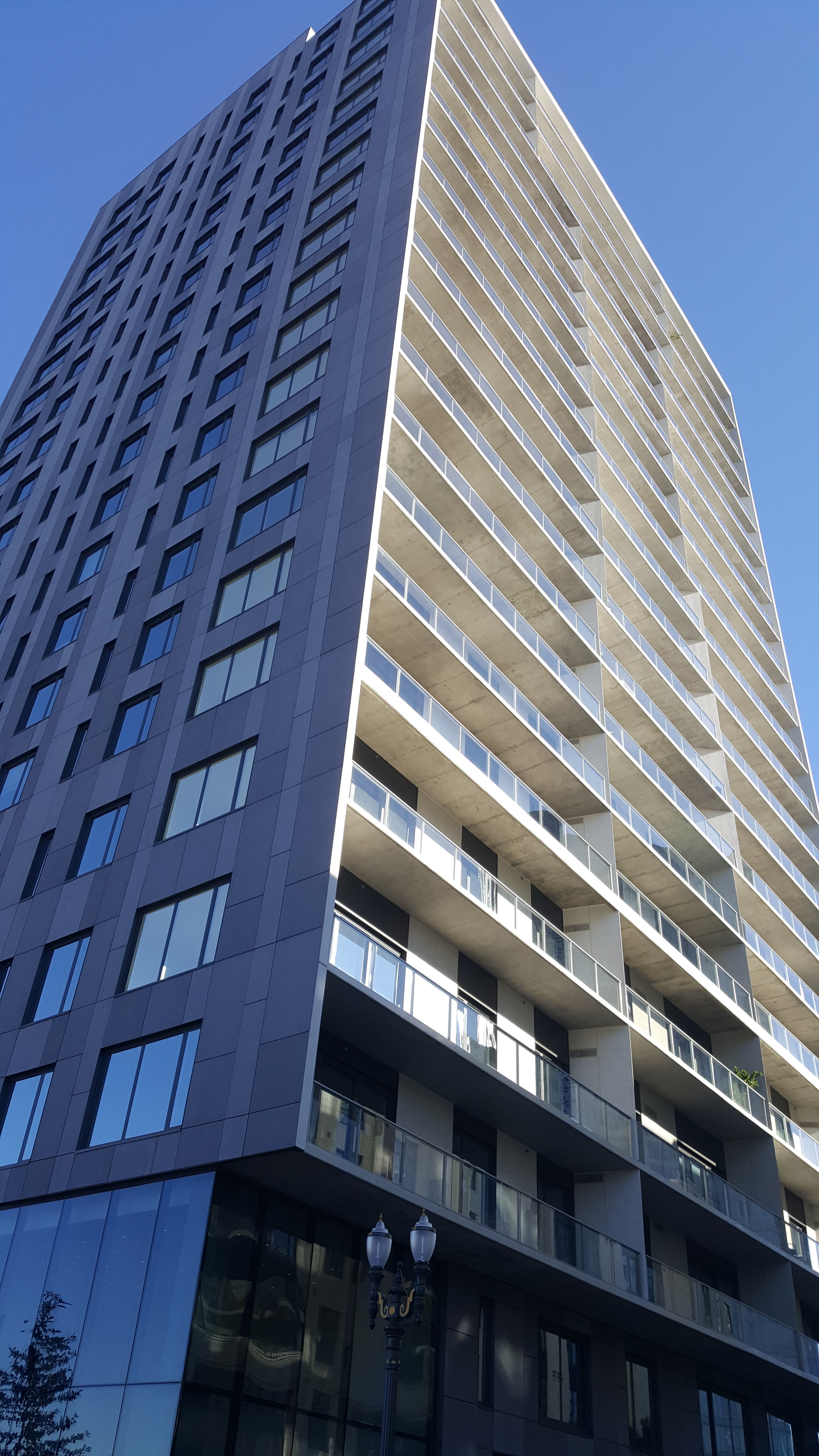
- The building's exterior in 2020
- Interactive map of the Vista Pearl area

General information
- Location: 1150 NW Quimby Street, Portland, Oregon, United States

Vista Pearl, formerly Block 20, is a skyscraper in Portland, Oregon's Pearl District, in the United States.
