= Bluehour =

Defunct restaurant and bar in Portland, Oregon, U.S.

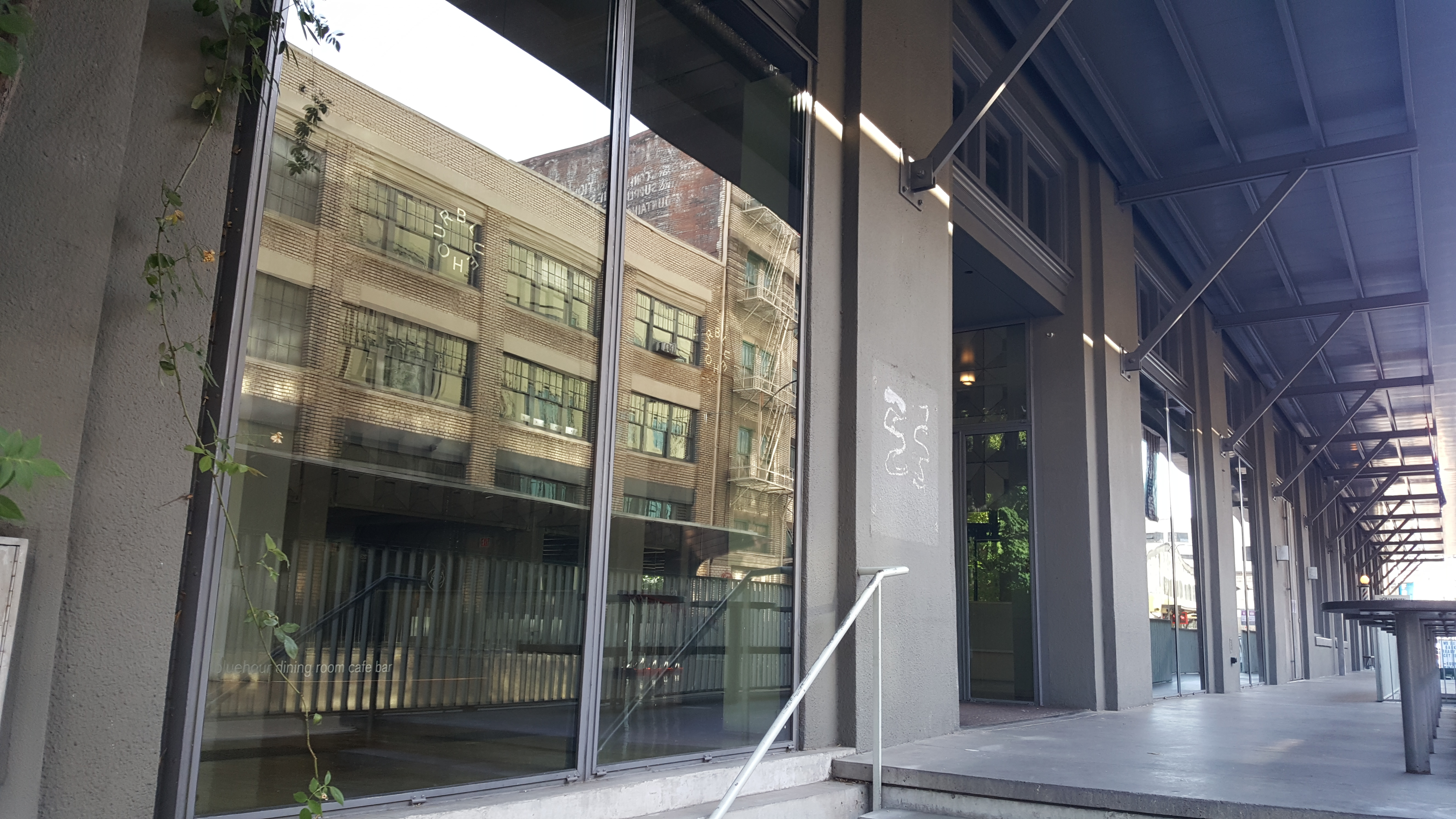
- The restaurant's exterior in August 2020, after closing during the COVID-19 pandemic
- Interactive map of Bluehour

Restaurant information
- Established: September 2000
- Closed: June 2020
- Owners: Bruce Carey; Kenny Giambalvo; Joe Rogers
- Chef: Kenny Giambalvo; Thomas Boyce (2011–2013); Dolan Lane
- Food type: Mediterranean
- Location: 250 Northwest 13th Avenue, Portland, Multnomah, Oregon, 97209, United States
- Coordinates: 45.5248719°N 122.6862279°W

Bluehour (sometimes erroneously called Blue Hour) was a Mediterranean restaurant and bar located in the Pearl District of Portland, Oregon, United States. The business began operating in September 2000. Bruce Carey and Joe Rogers co-owned the business with Kenny Giambalvo, who also served as an executive chef until 2011.

The changing menu included French and Italian cuisine, as well as food with Asian and Latin-American influences. Bluehour garnered a positive reception; Michael J. Rosen described it as "nationally acclaimed". The restaurant was considered a place "to see and be seen", and was recommended in many regional guide books. Bluehour hosted many notable people and was included in CNN's 2015 list of the "best places to eat with celebrities" in the United States. The restaurant closed in 2020 during the COVID-19 pandemic.

== Description ==
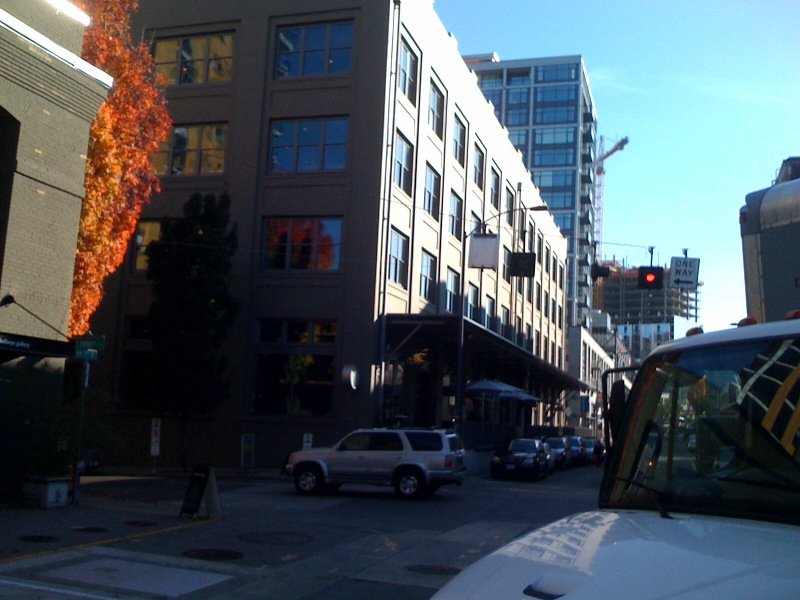
Exterior of the building which housed Bluehour, 2008

Bluehour operated in the Pearl District of Northwest Portland, Oregon; it was located in a five-story structure that was built in 1910 and known as the Ice House, and later as the Wieden+Kennedy Building because of tenant Wieden+Kennedy. The business had been described as a fine dining and upscale Mediterranean restaurant with dim lighting and "dramatic" curtains. The restaurant's event room L'Heure Bleue accommodated approximately 64 people.

Food & Wine and Michael Russell of The Oregonian described Bluehour as "hip" and "swank", respectively. Food writer Laurie Wolf called the restaurant "sophisticated". Portland Monthly described Bluehour as "a Portland institution" and said its "loading-dock seats offer prime people-watching and a perch for one of Portland's best happy hours". In Fodor's Gay Guide to the USA (2001), Andrew Collins said Bluehour offered a changing menu "to an arty and urbane crowd". The restaurant sometimes hosted jazz on weekends.

Bluehour employed a fromager using a rolling cheese cart, and served brunch on weekends until 2011.

=== Menu ===
The French and Italian menu offered fare "as American as European", including gnocchi with black truffles, octopus terrine, risotto with sturgeon, red peppers, and basil; as well as sea scallops with bacon. The restaurant also served charcuteries, pasta, duck breast with root vegetables and huckleberries, salmon tartare, a Caesar salad, veal sweetbreads, caramel pot de crème, and options with "Asian and Latin influences".

The happy hour menu included fried picholine olives, Italian white bean purée, pork belly sliders, bruschetta, a burger on ciabatta, and vegetable sandwiches. On the drink menu, the Bluehour Breeze cocktail had grapefruit-infused vodka with cranberry, and the Chocolate Chai Old Fashioned had chai-infused whiskey, simple syrup, and chocolate bitters with an orange twist. The dessert menu included hazelnut buttermilk cake with peaches, served with candied hazelnuts, apricot gelée and milk sherbet.

Protestors picketed outside Bluehour because the restaurant served foie gras.

== History ==
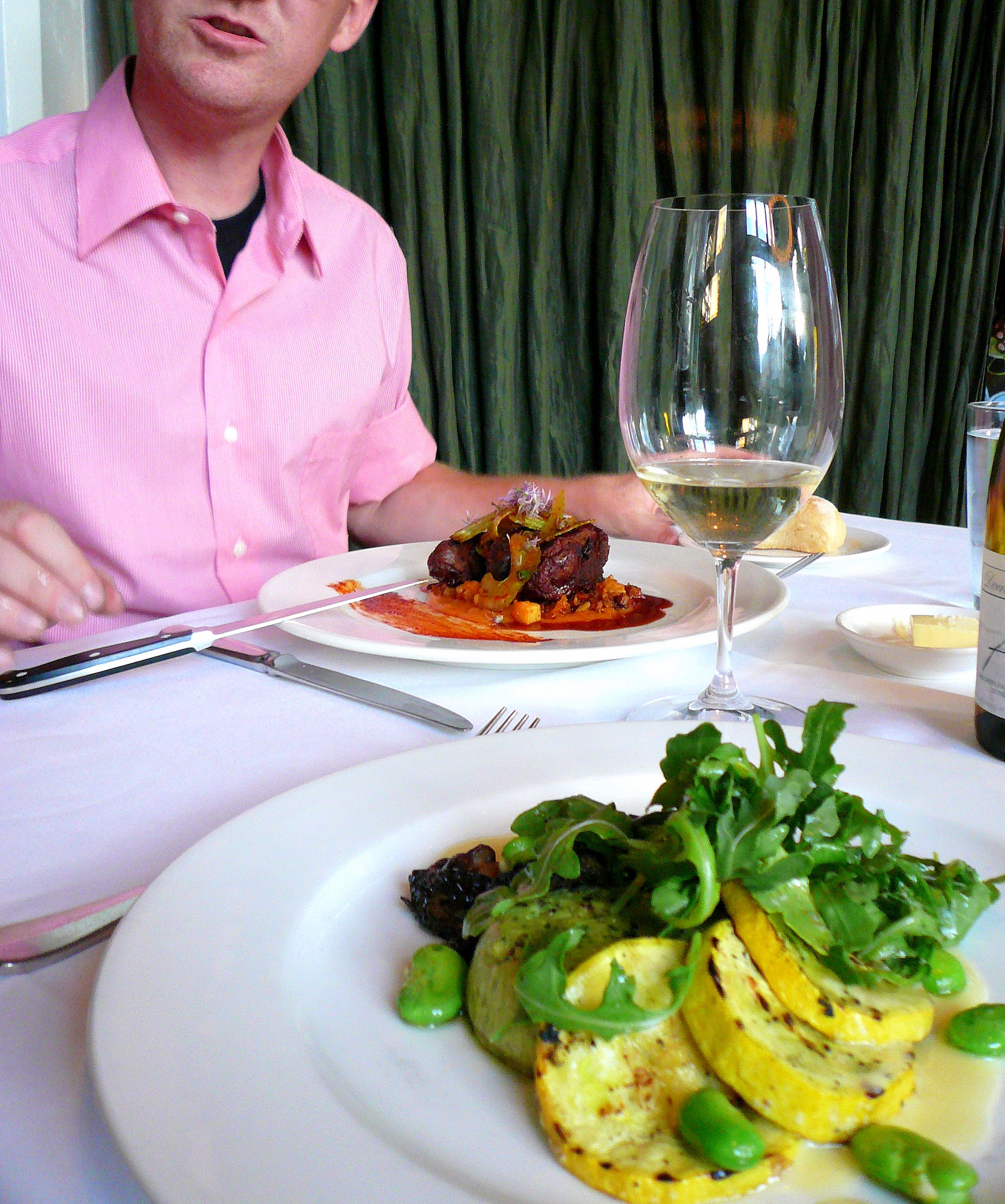
Plated food, 2008

Bluehour opened in September 2000. Bruce Carey and Joe Rogers were co-owners with Kenny Giambalvo, who also served as executive chef. The architect was Brad Cloepfil, whose first restaurant project was Bluehour.

In 2004, Bluehour hosted the first Chef's Invitational Dinner, which Willamette Week described as "a cooking-school contest à la Donald Trump's TV hit" with menus submitted by 38 Western Culinary Institute students.

Giambalvo resigned as executive chef in 2011. He continued to serve as a member of the limited liability company (LLC) that owned the restaurant. The same year, Thomas Boyce became head chef, and Dolan Lane of Clarklewis replaced him in January 2013. Chefs Kyo Koo and Manuel Lopez also worked at Bluehour.

The restaurant served a morel-and-fromage blanc pizza during Eater Portland's Pizza Week in 2013. The same year, a bartender suffered first-degree and second-degree burns while making a cocktail. Funds were raised to help pay for his recovery. The bartender later sued Carey and Giambalvo, seeking $600,000 "for pain, permanent disfigurement despite skin-graft surgeries and physical limitations", according to The Oregonian.

Notable people who dined at Bluehour include Fred Armisen, Carrie Brownstein, John Kitzhaber, Robin Lopez, Wesley Matthews, and Gus Van Sant, according to CNN's Jordan Burchette, who included Bluehour in a 2015 list of the "best places to eat with celebrities" in the United States. John Legend hosted an after-party at Bluehour in 2005. In 2016, Bluehour was ranked thirteenth in The Oregonian's list of Portland's most expensive restaurants.

=== COVID-19 pandemic and closure ===
In March 2020, after many restaurants were closed because of the COVID-19 pandemic, some Bluehour staff received letters from Carey's restaurant group stating 25 percent of their final paycheck would be deferred. Jenny Smith, communication director for the Oregon Bureau of Labor and Industries, said, "Paying only part of what workers are owed when they are laid off is a violation of Oregon law".

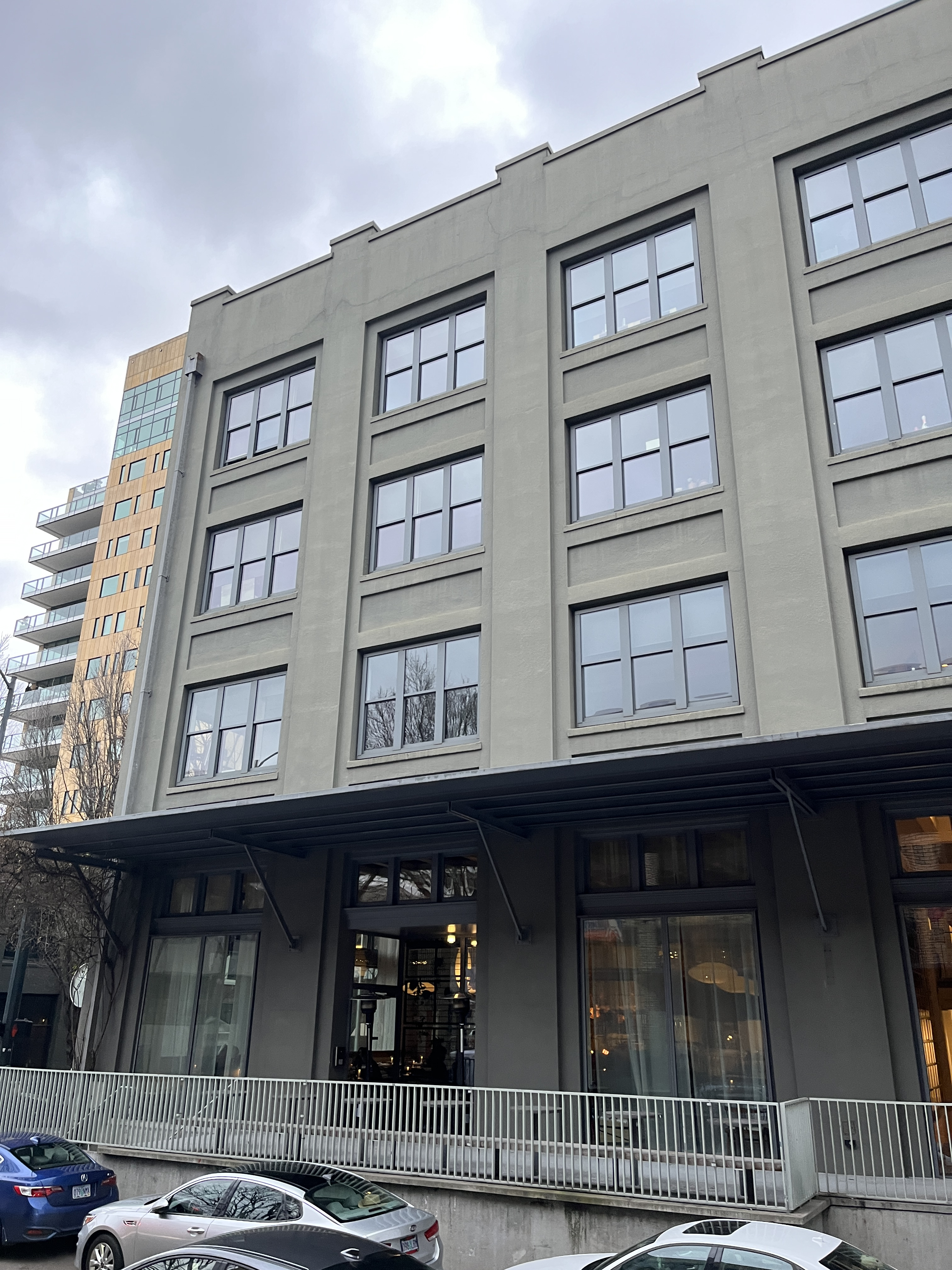
Entrance to Janken (pictured in 2023), which is housed in the space previously occupied by Bluehour

Bluehour permanently closed in June 2020. On social media, Carey thanked patrons and staff, and wrote: "With great sadness and regret, I must announce today that Bluehour will not reopen. The prospects for a profitable relaunch have dimmed considerably in the context of a far-off, post-COVID future where casual service, social-distancing, to-go service and delivery are all key to any viable restaurant business plan."

A new restaurant named Janken began operating in the space in 2022.

== Reception ==
In 2002, Gourmet said Bluehour is "the place for some to be seen and for others to eat seriously well". Out magazine recommend the "succulent" seafood at the "very gay, very hip Mediterranean eatery" in 2002. Michael J. Rosen called the restaurant "nationally acclaimed" in his book "Baking from the Heart" (2004), and public policy analyst Randal O'Toole called Bluehour the "ritziest" restaurant in the Pearl District in "The Best-Laid Plan" (2007). In 2007, Laura Barton included the restaurant in The Guardian's list of Portland's top-ten diners, saying it offered "one of the canniest ways" to enjoy happy hour, and Robert Sullivan of The New York Times Magazine called Bluehour "a bright star in the Portland food constellation".

In 2004, Byron Beck of Willamette Week called Bluehour "one of the city's most beloved restaurants". Bluehour won the Best Restaurant to Take Advantage of Your Expense Account category of the newspaper's annual Best of Portland readers' poll in 2004. In the 2007 poll, the restaurant tied in the category Best Restaurant for Blowing Someone Else's Dough and was a runner-up in the category Best Place to Rub Shoulders with the Beautiful People. Willamette Week's Kevin Allman wrote in 2007: "Bluehour is still perfect for the pretty Pearl District: pretty décor, pretty dishes, pretty servers—and pretty expensive. Actually, it's two restaurants. By day it's a sunny power-lunch lair. By night, it's one of the few Portland settings where Paris (or Perez) Hilton would fit right in."

In 2015, Chad Walsh of Eater Portland recommended Bluehour's private event room, saying, "if you're looking to put a little bit of sexy L.A.-style zing into your holiday party". Janelle Lassalle included the restaurant in Thrillist's 2018 list of Portland's "most romantic restaurants right now". In 2020, Suzette Smith of Portland Mercury described Bluehour as a "classy spot" and a "staple of NW Portland drinking and dining for almost 20 years". The business was included in Portland Monthly's 2025 list of 25 restaurants "that made Portland".

=== Guide books ===
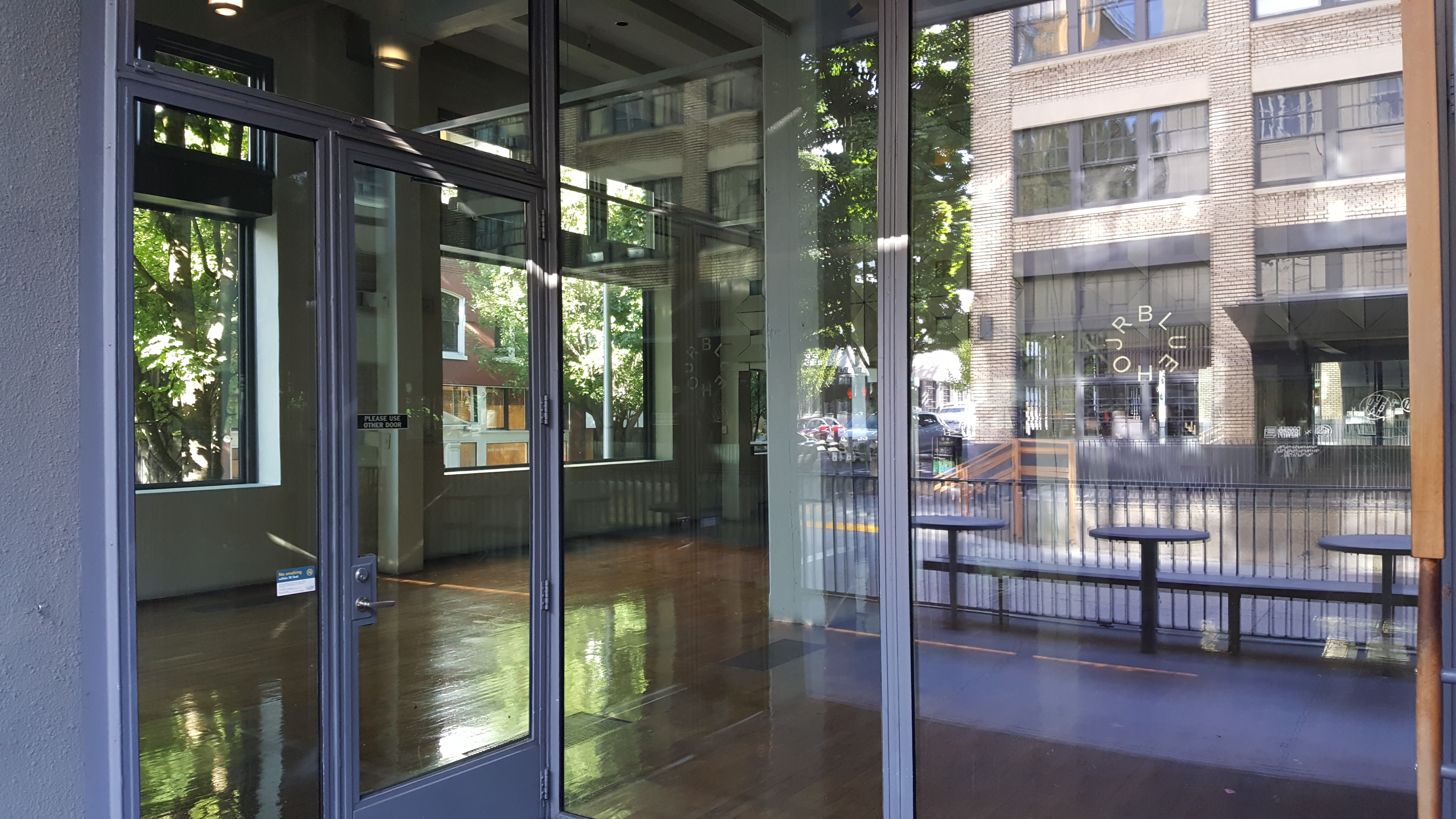
Exterior, 2020

According to Insiders' Guide to Portland, Oregon (2003), Bluehour was "routinely noted as the place to see and be seen in Portland". The 2004 edition of Best Places Northwest (2004) awarded Bluehour its maximum rating of three stars. The 2010 edition of the book rates the restaurant four stars out of four.

Bluehour was called one of Portland's most romantic restaurants by Fodor's in 2010 and 2011. Fodor's Pacific Northwest (2015) and the 2017 edition of Fodor's Oregon said the restaurant was "especially notable for sipping and socializing". Moon Oregon (2004) says Bluehour:

has been Portland's restaurant of the moment for several years now, garnering raves from the national press, and with good reason. Though the prices pack a wallop, the Italian-by-Northwest cuisine here is equal parts inventive and traditional, which suits the tastes of the local Beautiful People who haunt this Pearl District ex-warehouse. On busy nights, the artfully spare dining room doubles as an echo chamber.

The 2020 edition of Moon Oregon says Bluehour:

is one of Portland's few really swanky restaurants. The cooking is nominally Italian, though the kitchen is fluent in many cuisines, resulting in sophisticated dishes that are flavor-focused, revelatory, and fun all at the same time. If you don't feel like getting dressed up for the dining room, the bar has its own menu and a more relaxed vibe.

Laurie Wolf recommended Bluehour for breakfast and brunch in "Food Lovers' Guide to Portland, Oregon" (2014).

== See also ==
- COVID-19 pandemic in Portland, Oregon
- Impact of the COVID-19 pandemic on the restaurant industry in the United States
