= The Fields Park =

Public park in Portland, Oregon, U.S.

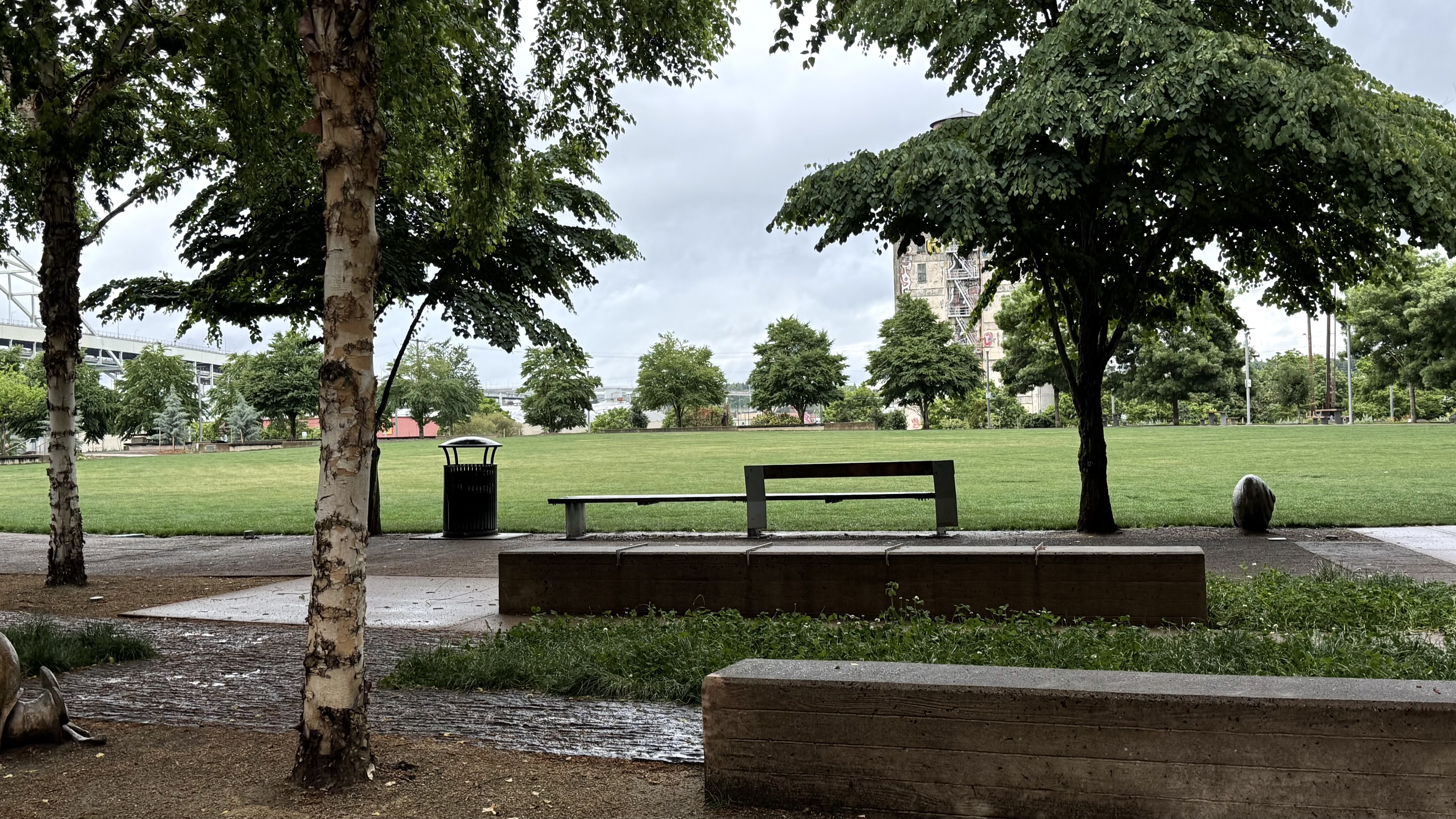
- The park in May 2026
- Interactive map of The Fields Park
- Type: Urban park; dog park
- Location: NW Overton St. and NW 11th Ave. Portland, Oregon
- Coordinates: 45.533°N 122.682°W
- Area: 3.2 acres (1.3 ha)
- Operator: Portland Parks & Recreation

The Fields Park is an urban greenspace in the Pearl District of Portland, Oregon, United States.

== Description ==
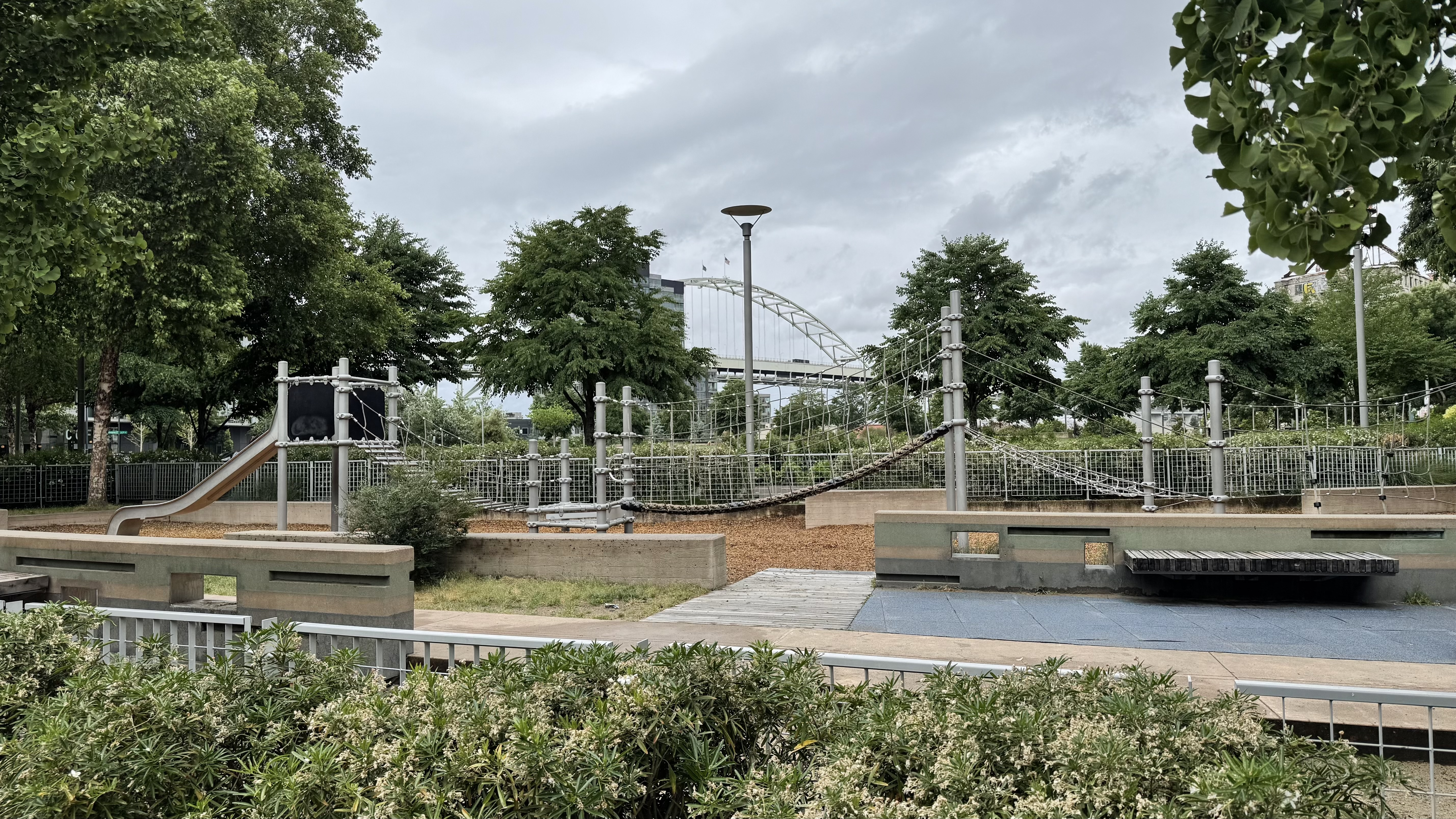
Playground in May 2026

The urban park in northwest Portland's Pearl District consists of a large oval field, an enclosed children's playground, and a fenced-in dog park as well as picnic tables, an earthquake emergency communication node, and a Portland loo restroom. It is part of the 2001 River District Renewal plan to build and link four parks, which also includes Jamison Square and Tanner Springs Park. The Fields Park is the largest of these parks. Its original design included a foot bridge over the nearby railway tracks, connecting to a fourth park on the bank of the Willamette River. This feature was never built and the fourth park has not begun construction.

The grounds slope gradually to guide storm runoff to flow into several bioretention gardens which filter the water. Sixty percent of the park’s infrastructure is dedicated to mitigating urban heat island effects.

A public art project consisting of six bronze sculptures titled “Snails” was installed in 2013. It was created by local artist Christine Bourdette.

== History ==
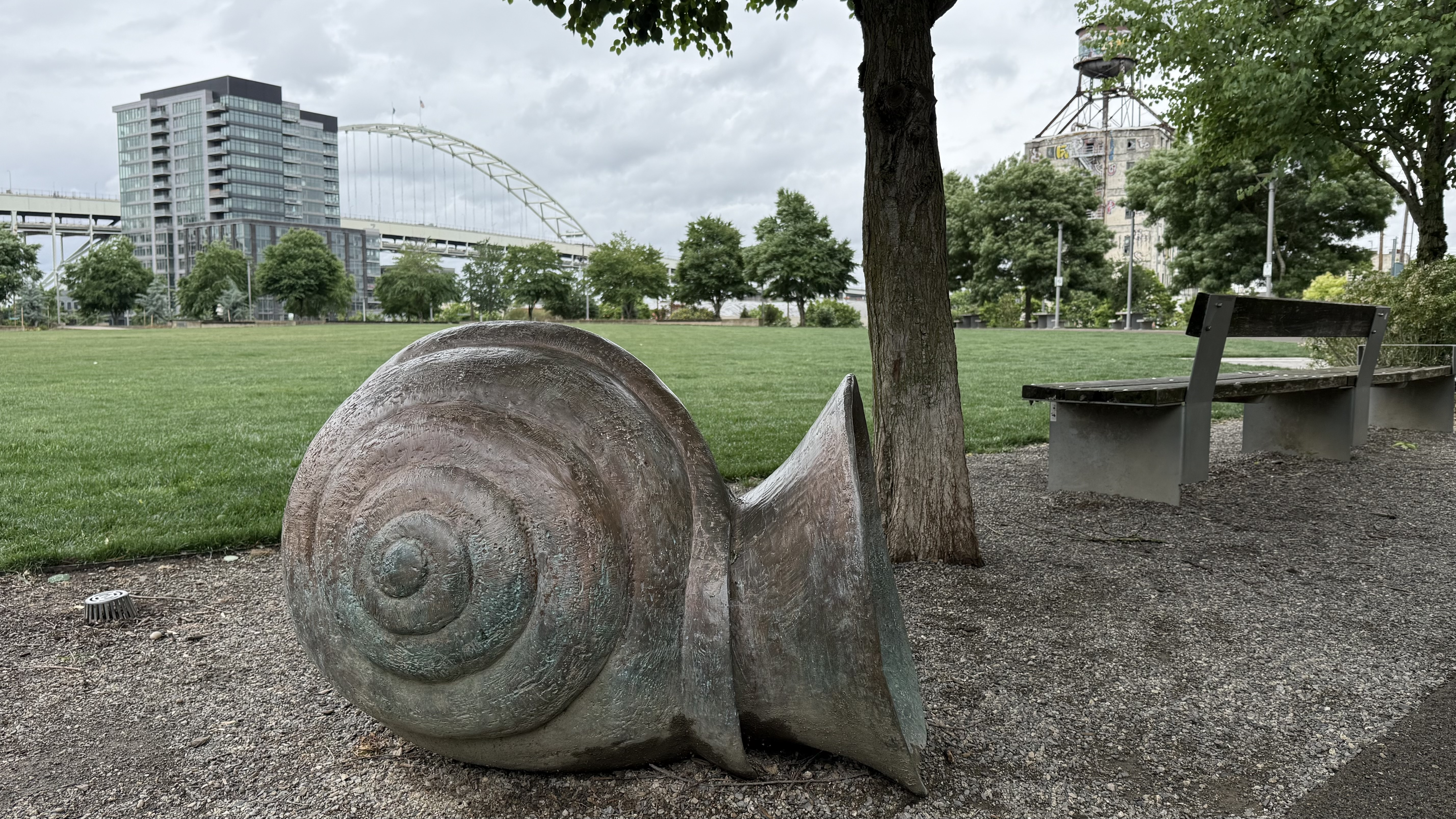
Sculpture in May 2026

The land for this park was given to the city of Portland in 2011 by Hoyt Street Properties (HSP) in exchange for up to $650,000 in credits that could used to pay charges to the city that HSP might incur during future developments.

A ceremony to begin construction was held on March 6, 2012. Representatives from Hoyt Street Properties, the Pearl District Neighborhood Association, the Portland Development Commission and Portland Parks & Recreation were in attendance. The 3.2-acre park opened in May of 2013 and has been estimated to cost up to $4 million.

Past community events hosted within The Fields Park include a zombie movie and costume contest, the Portland Film Festival, the Portland Craft Beer Festival, outdoor movie events, a pop-up opera event, and yoga in the park.

The park was under construction for 2 years due to the Pacific Power Willamette River Crossing Project. During construction, the playground, walking path and dog park were available for public access. It reopened in April of 2026. The park was closed temporarily in August 2026, after the Centennial Mills structure was damaged by fire and fully reopened in October, 2026.
