= Jamison Square =

Public park in Portland, Oregon, United States

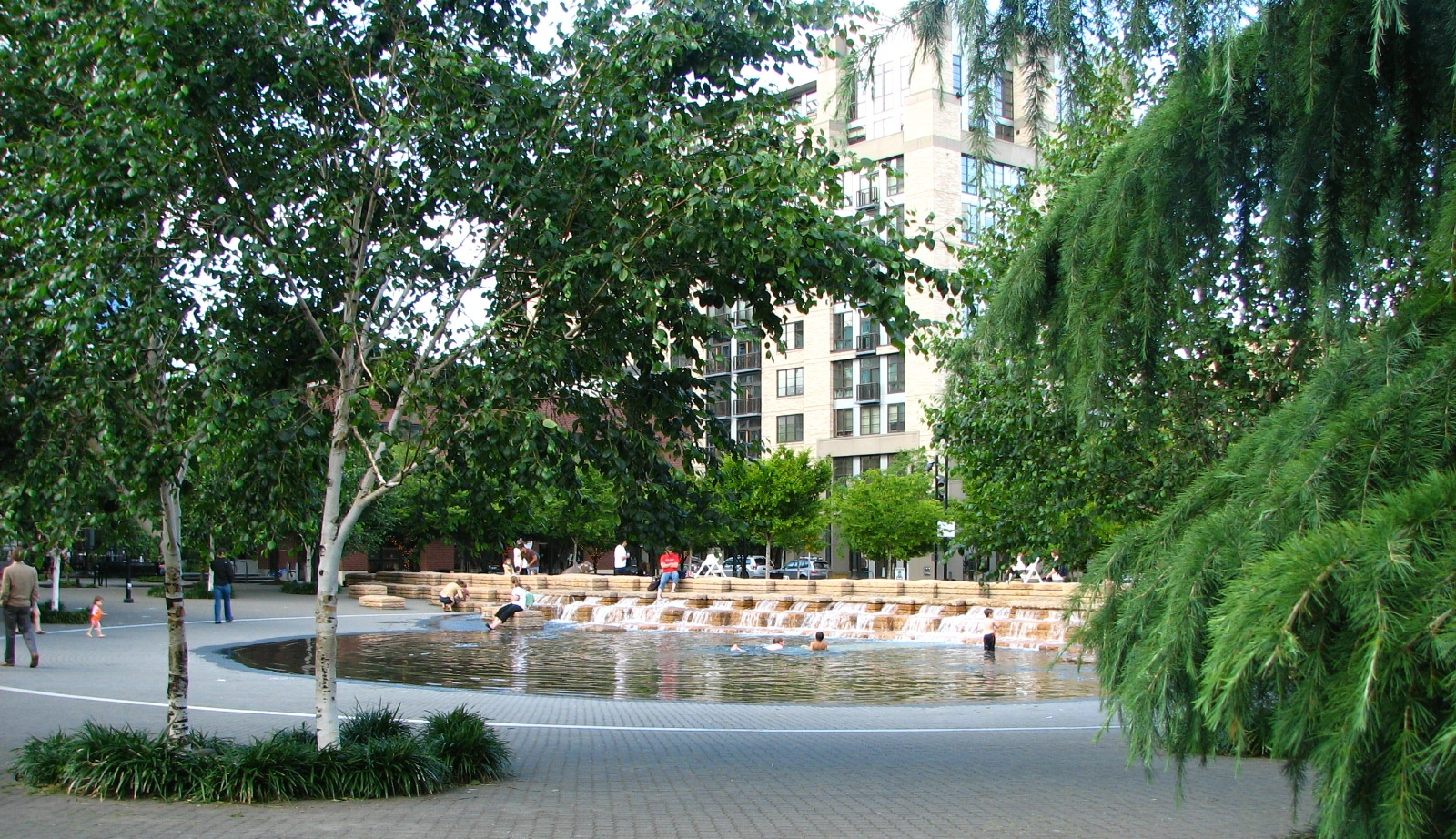
- The park's wading pool in 2008
- Interactive map of Jamison Square
- Type: Urban park
- Location: 810 NW 11th Ave. Portland, Oregon
- Coordinates: 45.5289°N 122.682°W
- Area: 0.94 acres (0.38 ha)
- Created: 2000
- Operator: Portland Parks & Recreation
- Status: Open 5 a.m. to midnight daily
- Public transit: NSAB

Jamison Square is a pocket park in Portland, Oregon's Pearl District. It was the first of a series of three parks to be added to the neighborhood as part of the 2001 River District Renewal plan, including Tanner Springs Park and The Fields Park. A fourth park was planned but has not begun construction.

== Design ==
At a cost of $3.6 million, this urban green space was designed and built during the 12-year tenure of Mayor Vera Katz.

Designed by PWP Landscape Architecture, the park was initially intended as an outdoor art gallery, with square rocks and steps at the center, but no water. Water, running at random times over the rock, was added to keep skateboarding teenagers from using them. The water on the rocks ended up turning the park into an urban beach, attracting children and families who use it as a wading pool, with the intermittent nature making it a "manmade tidal pool", also called "the community pond" by locals. A wooden boardwalk, made of ipê, connects Jamison Park to Tanner Springs Park, two blocks away, and is intended to eventually connect to the Willamette River.

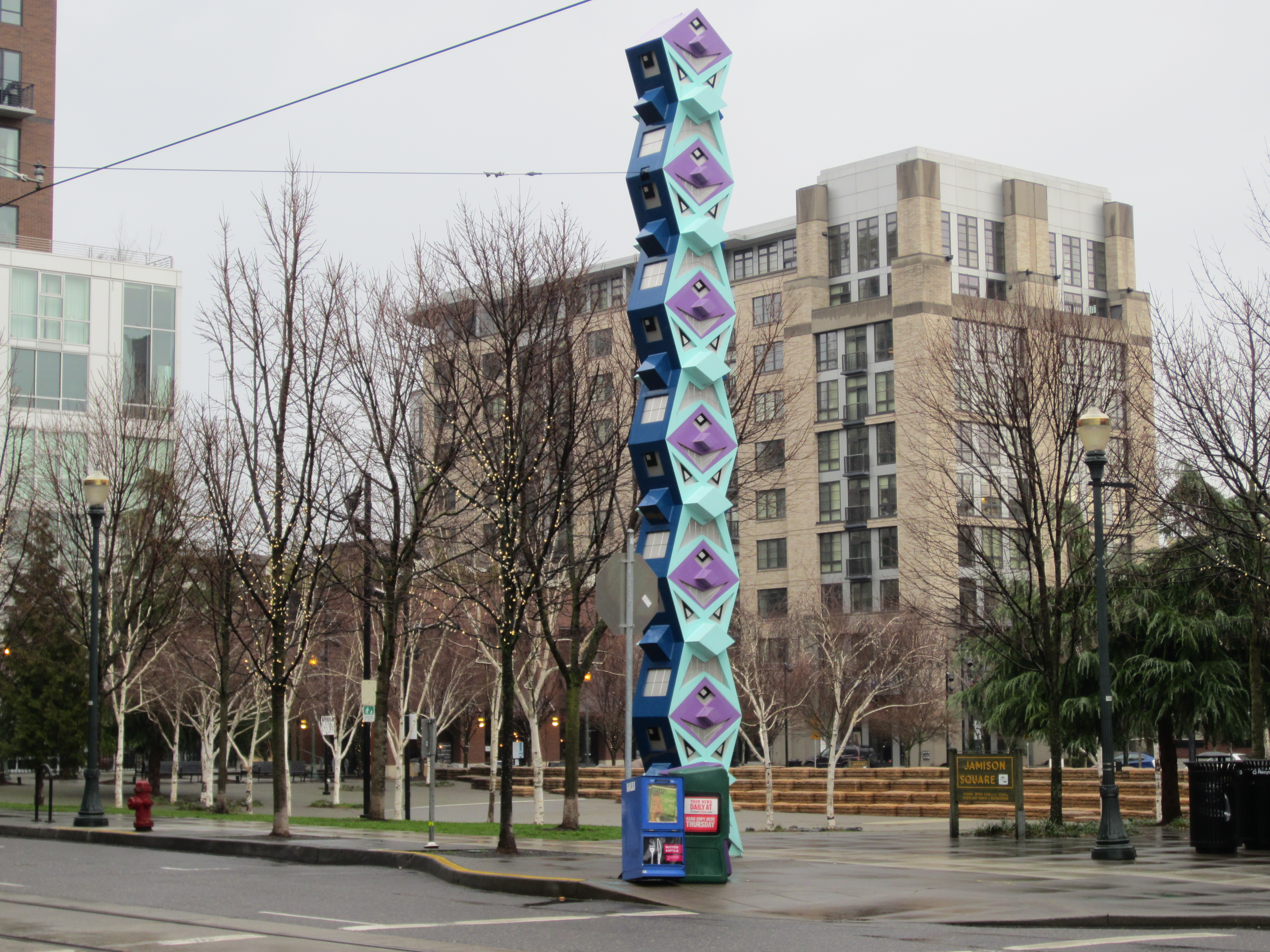
One of the totem poles that also function as support poles for the Portland Streetcar's overhead wire.

The park design includes three main elements: a fountain, a boardwalk, and an outdoor gallery. The stone fountain metaphorically expresses the idea of an "aquifer," as water pours out of the stone steps, filling up the gently sloping ground until the water is about 12 inches deep, at which point the water drains back out and the ground is dry.

The square includes four 30-foot modern totem poles, created by Kenny Scharf and Paige Powell in 2001, named Tikitotmoniki Totems. The Oregonian lampooned the art in late 2002, saying "the Pearl Arts Foundation commissioned '80s art star Kenny Scharf to put up goofy Tiki Totems" in the park. However, the totem poles are also functional, as they hide steel support poles for the overhead trolley wires that supply power to the Portland Streetcar, which began operation in 2001. The Portland Streetcar passes on two sides of the park.

The Pearl District kept a cancer survivors' memorial from being placed in the park. The park also features an orange steel sculpture called Contact II by Alexander Liberman.

The park, considered a pocket park, opened in May 2002, based on a 1999–2000 master plan for parks in the Pearl District, all connected by a water theme. It was named for William Jamison (1945–1995), an art gallery owner who was a proponent of the Pearl District and died of AIDS-related illness.

== Recreation ==
Many events are held at the park, including the Kids Marching Band, Kids in the Pearl Block Party, Movies in the Pearl, weekly Splashdance "movement-based storytelling" by BodyVox, Pedalpalooza, and Portland Bastille Day festival, complete with the French-inspired Portland Waiters Race. The Portland Bastille Day festival attracted 5,500 visitors in 2007. A form of boules, Pétanque, plays in a court at the park. The park has also been home to portions of Portland Institute for Contemporary Art's Time-Based Art Festival, beginning in 2003 with a performance by Eiko & Koma, and Anna Halprin's "Blank Placard Happening" in 2008. Fenouil, a well-regarded local French brasserie, had a special "picnic in the park" menu and delivered lunch to the park until it closed in 2011.

== Reception ==
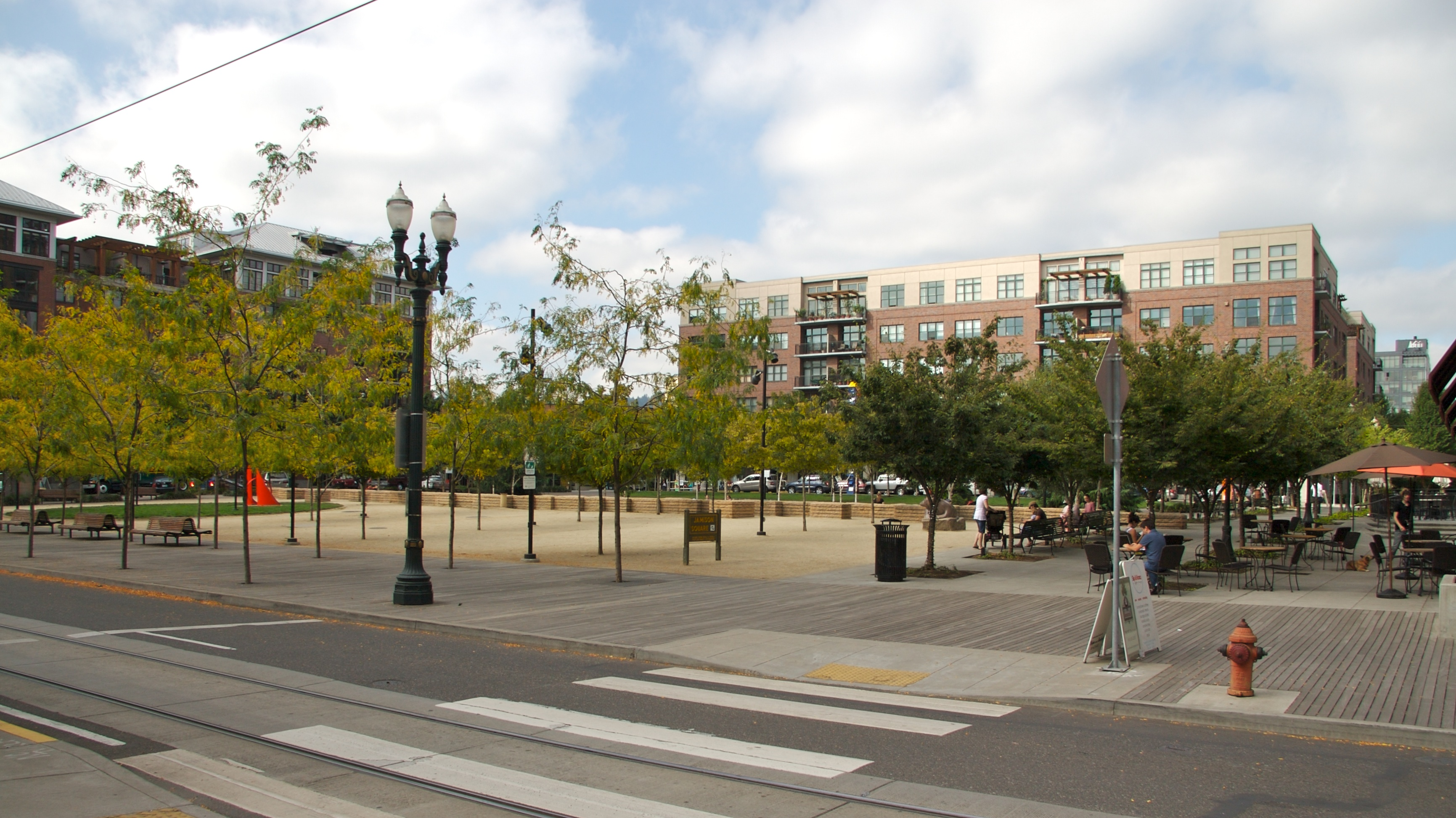
The park in 2007

The park has been very popular with locals, and has been considered a modern success in the vein of Pioneer Courthouse Square. The Oregonian called it "Portland's biggest kid magnet". Architect Laurie Olin remarked "I was astonished over the social conflicts there. They seem savage and uncivil, the poor behavior between the two groups: parents with kids and people with dogs. It seems like a health hazard. I find it puzzling in its sociology, not in its design." It's been observed that it's a "water park for kids" that is "nestled among the Pearl's poshest pads and toniest boutiques". The park has also been criticized for being a "missed opportunity to produce something visionary". Joe Fitzgibbon of The Oregonian calls Jamison Square "just another symbol of the Pearl District's transformation from industrial neighborhood to sleek, 21st-century community."

The popularity of the park with children led to requests and plans for a public restroom as early as spring 2009, but the idea encountered resistance from residents concerned about the noise and crime it might bring, due to its being planned to be open 24 hours a day. A 24-hour public restroom called Portland Loo opened at the park in December 2010.
