= Kevin Salatino =

American curator

- Education: Columbia University (BA); University of Pennsylvania (PhD)
- Occupation: Curator
- Organization: Art Institute of Chicago

Kevin Salatino is an American curator and museum director. He currently serves as chair and Anne Vogt Fuller and Marion Titus Searle Curator in the department of prints and drawings of the Art Institute of Chicago. He was formerly a director of the Bowdoin College Museum of Art and the art collection of the Huntington Library.

== Biography ==
Salatino is a native of Stamford, Connecticut. He received his AB from Columbia University and PhD from University of Pennsylvania.

He was curator of graphic arts at the Getty Research Institute from 1991 to 2000, when he became head of the department of prints and drawings at Los Angeles County Museum of Art. In 2009, he was named director of Bowdoin College Museum of Art. At Bowdoin, he curated exhibitions of the works of Edward Hopper and William Wegman. He left Bowdoin in 2012 to become director of art collections at The Huntington Library and Botanical Gardens. He was the first curator or director to have served on the staffs of Los Angeles' three biggest visual art institutions. During his tenure at the Huntington, he strengthened the museum's holdings of British and Continental paintings, sculpture, decorative arts, prints and drawings, and expanded its collection of American art.

In 2017, Salatino was appointed the new Anne Vogt Fuller and Marion Titus Searle Chair and curator of prints and drawings at the Art Institute of Chicago.

He has given talks at the Museum of Fine Arts, Houston, the Louvre, Bard College, and delivered the Clarice Smith Distinguished Lecture in the History of Art at the Smithsonian American Art Museum.
