= William Wegman (photographer) =

American photographer (born 1943)

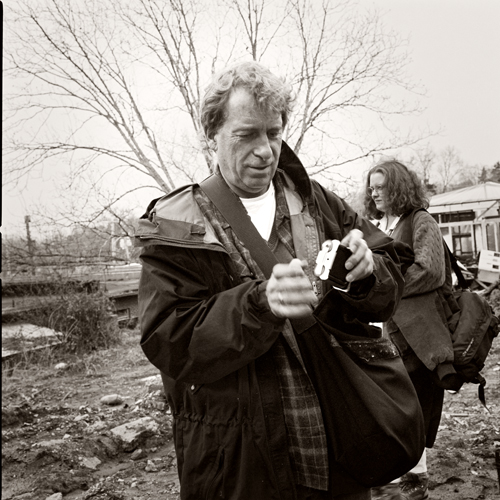
- Wegman in 2006
- Born: December 2, 1943 (age 82); Holyoke, Massachusetts, U.S.
- Education: Bachelor of Fine Arts degree in painting from Massachusetts College of Art and Master of Fine Arts degree in painting from University of Illinois in 1967
- Known for: Video and photo
- Notable work: La Jolla Vista View; Dog Duet
- Spouse: Christine Burgin
- Children: 2
- Website: williamwegman.com

Blue Period with Banjo, Polaroid ER print by William Wegman, 1980

Volcano by Wegman, 1988, acrylic and oil on canvas, Honolulu Museum of Art

William Wegman (born December 2, 1943) is an American artist best known for creating series of compositions involving dogs, primarily his own Weimaraners in various costumes and poses.

== Life and career ==
Wegman originally intended to pursue a career as a painter. He received a Bachelor of Fine Arts in painting from Massachusetts College of Art and Design in 1965 and a Master of Fine Arts degree in painting from the University of Illinois at Urbana–Champaign in 1967.

By the early 1970s, Wegman's work was being exhibited in museums and galleries internationally. In addition to solo shows with Sonnabend Gallery in Paris and New York, Situation Gallery in London, and Konrad Fischer Gallery in Düsseldorf, his work was included in such seminal exhibitions as "When Attitudes Become Form" and "Documenta 5", and regularly featured in magazines Interfunktionen, Artforum, and Avalanche.

While he was in Long Beach, Wegman got his dog, Man Ray, with whom he began a long and fruitful collaboration. Man Ray, known in the art world and beyond for his endearing deadpan presence, became a central figure in Wegman's photographs and videotapes. In 1982, Man Ray died, and was named "Man of the Year" by The Village Voice. It was not until 1986 that Wegman got a new dog, Fay Ray, and another collaboration began marked by Wegman's extensive use of the Polaroid 20 x 24 camera. With the birth of Fay's litter in 1989, Wegman's cast of characters grew to include Fay's offspring — Battina, Crooky, and Chundo — and later, their offspring: Battina's son Chip in 1995, Chip's son Bobbin in 1999 and Candy and Bobbin's daughter Penny in 2004.

Although primarily known as a photographer, Wegman returned to painting in the mid 1980s. Among his oeuvre of paintings are a number of canvases filled with smoke and fire that depict natural and manmade disasters. Volcano, in the collection of the Honolulu Museum of Art, demonstrates this aspect of the artist's work.

He appeared on The Colbert Report in 2010. Wegman is the author of numerous books for children, including the New York Times bestseller Puppies. His latest children's book, Flo & Wendell, is published with Dial Books for Young Readers.

== Exhibitions and critical context ==
His work, which includes photography, video, painting and drawing, is held in permanent collections of the Museum of Modern Art, the Whitney Museum of American Art, the Hammer Museum, the Los Angeles County Museum of Art, the Centre Pompidou, and the Smithsonian American Art Museum.

His work has also been a popular success, and have appeared in books, advertisements, films, as well as on television programs like Sesame Street and Saturday Night Live. In 2006, Wegman's work was featured in a retrospective at the Brooklyn Museum, the Smithsonian American Art Museum, the Norton Museum of Art, Wexner Center for the Arts, and the Addison Gallery of American Art. The show, entitled William Wegman: Funney/Strange, explored 40 years of his work in all mediums.

== Public art ==
- Stationary Figures, 23rd Street Subway Station, MTA Arts & Design (2018) Glass mosaics
- Flock' and Mooselook, Maine Turnpike Authority murals (2007) Photographic murals installed in northbound and southbound Kennebunk Service Plazas in Kennebunk, Maine.
- Acadia, Maine Turnpike Authority murals (2007) Photographic mural installed at the West Gardiner Service Plaza in West Gardiner, Maine.
- Ready and Howdy, Washington Metropolitan Area Transit Authority, Art in Transit Program (2001) L'Enfant Plaza Metro Station.
- La Jolla Vista View (1988) was his first major outdoor permanent sculpture, a part of the Stuart Collection on the campus of the University of California, San Diego

== On Sesame Street ==
Wegman's dogs first appeared on Sesame Street in 1988. Fay Ray starred in segments like "Old McFay Counts to 40". In February 1996, descendants Battina (aka Batty), Crooky, Chundo and Chip starred in new segments based on nursery rhymes. Wegman told Entertainment Weekly, "They are only [being shot] maybe 30 seconds at a time. The rest of the time they're sitting around, rather blasé about life."

Segments include:

- "Old McFay Counts to 40" - Old McFay counts 40 lemons, three to four limes and one banana.
- "Dog Alphabet" - The dogs form all the letters of the alphabet and some of the letters they make get their own sketches.

Featured Dog Letters - The dogs form one letter of the alphabet on each segment. They were featured in segments: A, B, E, H, J, K, L, M, P, T, V, W and X

- "Dog Numbers" - The dogs form the numbers 1 to 9 then count backwards from 9 to 0.

Featured Dog Nursery Rhymes

- "Old Mother Hubbard"
- "Jack and Jill"
- "Little Jack Horner"
- "Little Miss Muffet"
- "Ten O'Clock Scholar"
- "Jack-a-Nory"
- "Cock-a-Doodle Doo"
- "Three Men In a Tub"
- "To Market"
- "Pat-a-Cake"
- "Jack Be Nimble"
- "Little Bo Peep"
- "Olde King Cole"
- "Jack Sprat"

Who Are The People In Your Neighborhood? - Based on the classic Sesame Street song, the dogs act out real life jobs. Some of these occupations included: Waiter, Painter, Sales Person, Truck Driver, Fisherman, Auto Mechanic, Hairdresser and Conductor.

Wegman dogs also appeared in the Elmo's World episode about dogs. One of the dogs act out as a police officer, stating, "That's right, Elmo. Dogs have very important jobs. There are police dogs who help out with the police." The other dog act out as a circus acrobat clown, stating that "There are circus dogs who perform at the circus." After the Dorothy’s Imagine, the two Wegman dogs as police officer and circus acrobat clown, stating that "Time to go now, we have to bake a cake."

== Personal life ==
Wegman is married to wife Christine Burgin, who is also his manager. He has two children. Wegman splits his time between New York City and his house on Rangeley Lake, Maine.

== Books ==
- Writing by Artist (Primary Information, 2022) Lampert, Andrew, ed., texts by Wegman.
- Being Human (Chronicle/Thames and Hudson, 2017). Texts by William A. Ewing and Wegman.
- William Wegman Paintings (Abrams, 2016). Texts by Martin Filler, Amy Hempel, Susan Orlean, Bob Elliott, Robert Krulwich, and Wegman.
- Hello Nature (Prestel, 2012). Texts by Kevin Salatino, Diana Tuite, and Wegman.
- Funney Strange (Yale University Press, 2006). Texts by Joan Simon and Wegman.
- How Do You Get to MOMAQNS? (New York: Museum of Modern Art, 2002).
- William Wegman: Polaroids (New York: Harry N. Abrams, 2002).
- Fay (New York: Hyperion, 1999).
- William Wegman: Fashion Photographs (New York: Harry N. Abrams, 1999). Text by Wegman and Ingrid Sischy.
- Field Guide to North America and to Other Regions (Venice, California: Lapis, 1993); French-language edition: Le Havre, France: Editions Flux, 2004. Translation by Heather Allen and Pierre Guislain.
- William Wegman: Paintings, Drawings, Photographs, Videotapes (New York: Harry N. Abrams, 1990). Kunz, Martin, ed., texts by Martin Kunz, Alain Sayag, Peter Schjeldahl, Wegman, Peter Weiermain, and David Ross.
- Everyday Problems: William Wegman (New York: Brightwater, 1984).
- $19.84 (Buffalo, New York: Center for the Exploratory and Perceptual Arts, 1984).
- Man's Best Friend (New York: Harry N. Abrams, 1982, 1999). Texts by Wegman and Laurance Wieder.
- William Wegman: Drawings, 1973-1997 by Wegman and Frédéric Paul (F.R.A.C. du Limousin, France)
- William Wegman: L'oeuvre Photographique, 1969-1976 (Limoges: Fonds regional d'art contemporain Limousin, 1993).

=== Books for children ===
- Flo & Wendell (New York: Dial Books for Young Readers, 2013).
- Dress Up Batty (New York: Hyperion Books for Children, 2004).
- Chip Wants a Dog (New York: Hyperion Books for Children, 2003; London: Turnaround, 2003).
- William Wegman's Wegmanology (New York: Hyperion Books for Children, 2001; London: Turnaround, 2001).
- The Night Before Christmas (New York: Hyperion Books for Children, 2000; London: Turnaround, 2001). Text by Clement Clarke Moore.
- Surprise Party (New York: Hyperion Books for Children, 2000; London: Turnaround, 2001. French-language edition: Joyeux Anniversaire. Paris: Editions Seuil Jeunesse, 2001).
- William Wegman's Pups (New York: Hyperion Books for Children, 1999; London: Turnaround, 1999).
- Baby Book (San Francisco: Chronicle, 1999). French-language edition: Le Livre de Bébé (Paris: Editions Seuil Jeunesse, 1999).
- What Do You Do? (New York: Hyperion Books for Children, 1999).
- My Town (New York: Hyperion Books for Children, 1998; Scholastic, 1999).
- William Wegman's Farm Days: or How Chip Learnt an Important Lesson on the Farm, or a Day in the Country, or Hip Chip's Trip, or Farmer Boy (New York: Hyperion Books for Children, 1997; Scholastic, 1998).
- Puppies (New York: Hyperion Books for Children, 1997).
- William Wegman's Mother Goose (New York: Hyperion Books for Children, 1996).
- Triangle, Square, Circle (New York: Hyperion Books for Children, 1995).
- 1, 2, 3 (New York: Hyperion Books for Children, 1995).
- ABC (New York: Hyperion Books for Children, 1994).
- The Making of Little Red Riding Hood (New York: Whitney Museum of American Art, 1994).
- Cinderella (New York: Hyperion Books for Children, 1993, 1999; New York: Scholastic, 1996. German-language edition: Munich: Schirmer/Mosel, 1993). Texts by Carole Kismaric and Marvin Heiferman.
- Little Red Riding Hood (New York: Hyperion Books for Children, 1993, 1999). Texts by Carole Kismaric and Marvin Heiferman. German-language edition: Rotkäppchen (Munich: Schirmer/Mosel, 1994); Spanish-language edition: Caperucita Rojer (Barcelona: Ediciones B., 2000).

== Partial filmography ==
- Dog Duet (1974)
- Dog Baseball (1986)
- Alive from Off Center (1988) (TV series; co-host with Ann Magnuson)
- Blue Monday '88 (1989) (New Order music video)
- Dog on Pedestals (1992) (three network ID's for Nickelodeon)
- Fay Presents: Alphabet Soup (1995)
- Fay Presents: Fay's 12 Days of Christmas (1995)
- The Hardly Boys in Hardly Gold (1996, screened at Sundance)
- Sesame Street: William Wegman's Mother Goose (1997)
- Front Porch (1999)

=== Released on Selected Video Works 1970–78 ===
- Milk/Floor
- Stomach 'Song
- Randy's Sick
- Pocketbook Man
- Talking Fish
- Out and In
- Rage and Depression
- Massage Chair
- Crooked Finger/Crooked Stick
- Deodorant
- Growl
- Spelling Lesson
- Drinking Milk
- Starter
- Bad Movies
- House for Sale
- Horseshoes

== See also ==
- Dog Bowl, a sculpture designed by Wegman, located in Portland, Oregon
