= Cosmopolitan on the Park =

Condominium skyscraper in Portland, Oregon

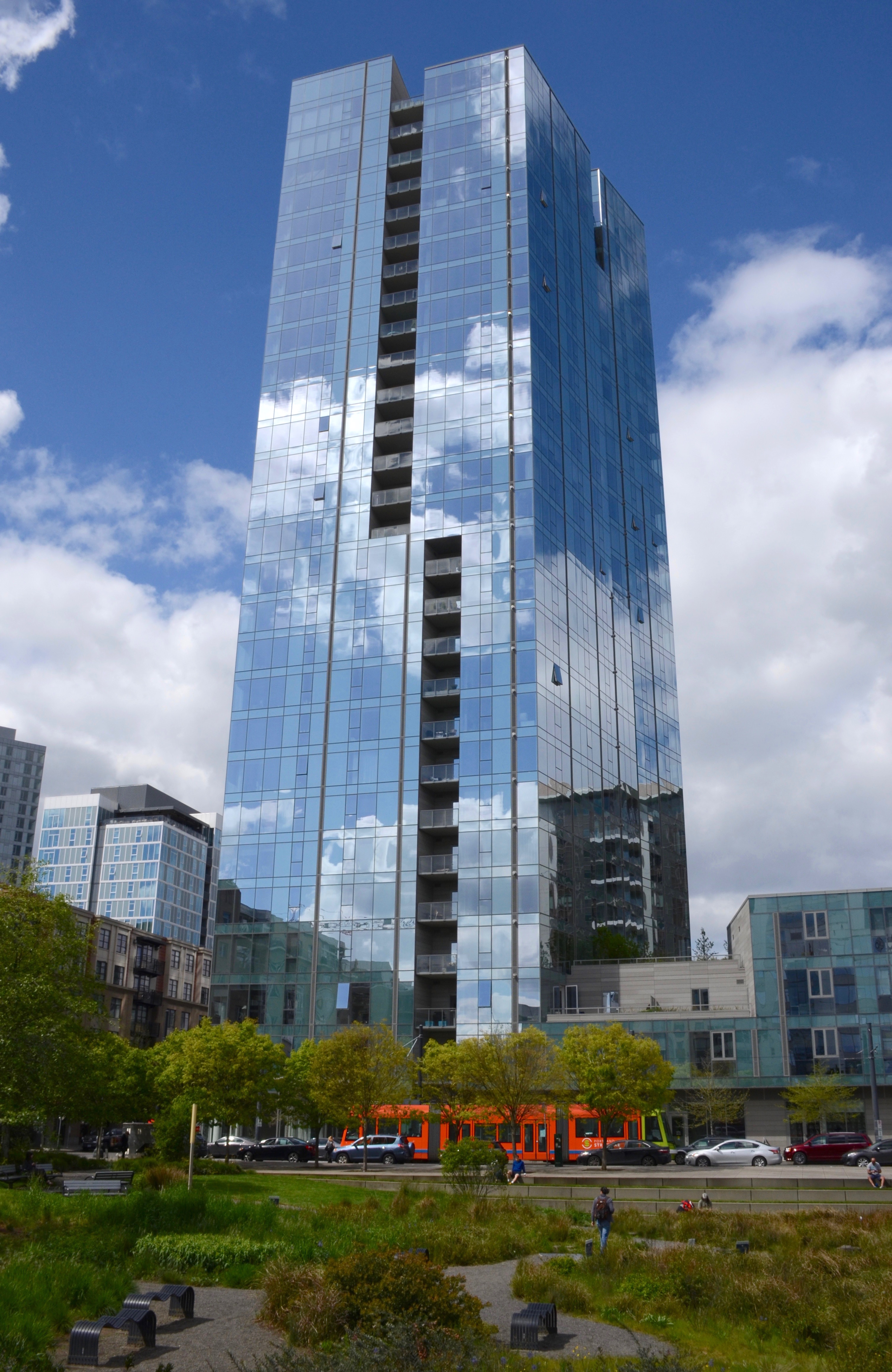
- The building's exterior viewed from the south, across Tanner Springs Park, in 2017

- Location within Portland, Oregon

General information
- Type: Residential, condominium
- Location: 1130 Northwest 10th Avenue; Portland, Oregon
- Coordinates: 45.531755°N 122.682226°W
- Completed: 2016
- Cost: US$108 million

Height
- Roof: 341 ft (104 m)

Technical details
- Floor count: 28
- Floor area: 353,400 sq ft (32,830 m^{2})

Design and construction
- Architect: Bora Architects
- Developer: Hoyt Street Properties
- Main contractor: Andersen Construction Company

References
- "Emporis building ID 1213038". Emporis. Archived from the original on 2017-08-02.

Cosmopolitan on the Park, or simply the Cosmopolitan, is a high-rise condominium building in Portland, Oregon's Pearl District, in the United States. Construction began in 2014 and was completed in 2016. It is the tallest building in the Pearl District and the tallest residential tower in Portland. Its glass curtain exterior wall system was designed by Benson Industries, of Portland, which designed and manufactured a similar exterior for One World Trade Center, in New York City.

== See also ==
- List of tallest buildings in Portland, Oregon
