= Memory 99 =

Sculpture by Lee Kelly in Portland, Oregon

- The sculpture in 2017
- Artist: Lee Kelly
- Type: Sculpture
- Medium: Corten steel
- Location: Portland, Oregon, United States; 45°31′36″N 122°40′44″W

Memory 99 is an outdoor steel sculpture by Lee Kelly, located at the North Park Blocks in downtown Portland, Oregon, United States.

== Description and history ==
Memory 99, a 4,000-pound Corten steel sculpture designed by Lee Kelly, is installed at the North Park Blocks at the front steps of the 511 Federal Building (511 Northwest Broadway), which houses the Pacific Northwest College of Art's (PNCA) Arlene and Harold Schnitzer Center for Art and Design. It is 11 feet (3.4 m) tall and 23 feet (7.0 m) wide. The sculpture was dedicated by PNCA on October 19, 2012.

The dedication of this sculpture marked the first move in a plan to turn the block in front of the PNCA into an additional green space, making it a continuation of the North Park Blocks.

== Reception ==
Portland Monthly called the sculpture's design "sweetly curved yet architecturally stark", and said it serves as a "marvelous example of the work that has made [Kelly] one of the most in demand artists in the region.

== See also ==
- List of works by Lee Kelly
