= Dog Bowl (sculpture) =

Sculpture in Portland, Oregon

- The sculpture in 2015
- Artist: William Wegman
- Year: 2002
- Type: Sculpture
- Medium: Bronze, granite, artificial turf
- Dimensions: 2.4 m × 3.0 m (8 ft × 10 ft)
- Location: Portland, Oregon, United States; 45.52469°N 122.67897°W

Dog Bowl is a 2002 outdoor sculpture by dog photographer William Wegman, located in the North Park Blocks in Portland, Oregon, United States.

== Description and history ==
Dog Bowl was designed by dog photographer William Wegman in 2001 and installed in the North Park Blocks between Davis and Everett streets in 2002. Wegman had been "cultivated" and privately funded by the Pearl Arts Foundation to create a work for Portland. The installation features a cast-bronze dog bowl set on an 8-foot (2.4 m) x 10-foot (3.0 m) checkerboard that is reminiscent of a linoleum kitchen floor. Most of the squares are black and white granite tiles, but four are artificial turf. The bowl was designed to be reminiscent of the Benson Bubbler drinking fountains installed throughout the city and is supplied by an underground water source. According to the Regional Arts & Culture Council, which administers the sculpture, Wegman said he created the sculpture "for dogs, not people", and prefers not to think of the bowl as public art. Wegman donated some of his earnings from the installation to the Oregon Humane Society, Foster Pets and the Delta Society.

== Reception ==
In 2012, the sculpture was included as a stop on Walktober's Weird Art Walk, a "tour of weird art" led by Carye Bye, a local artist.

== See also ==
- 2002 in art
- Fountains in Portland, Oregon
