= Tikitotmoniki Totems =

Sculpture series in Portland, Oregon

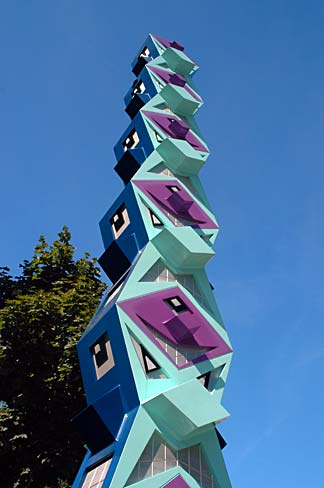
- One of the totem poles in 2006
- Artist: Kenny Scharf
- Year: 2001
- Type: Sculpture
- Medium: Painted aluminum
- Location: Portland, Oregon, United States; 45°31′45″N 122°40′56″W

Tikitotmoniki Totems (alternate spelling: Tikitotemoniki Totems; sometimes abbreviated as Tikitotmoniki or Tiki Totems) is a series of four outdoor 2001 sculptures by American artist Kenny Scharf, located at Jamison Square in Portland, Oregon.

== Description ==
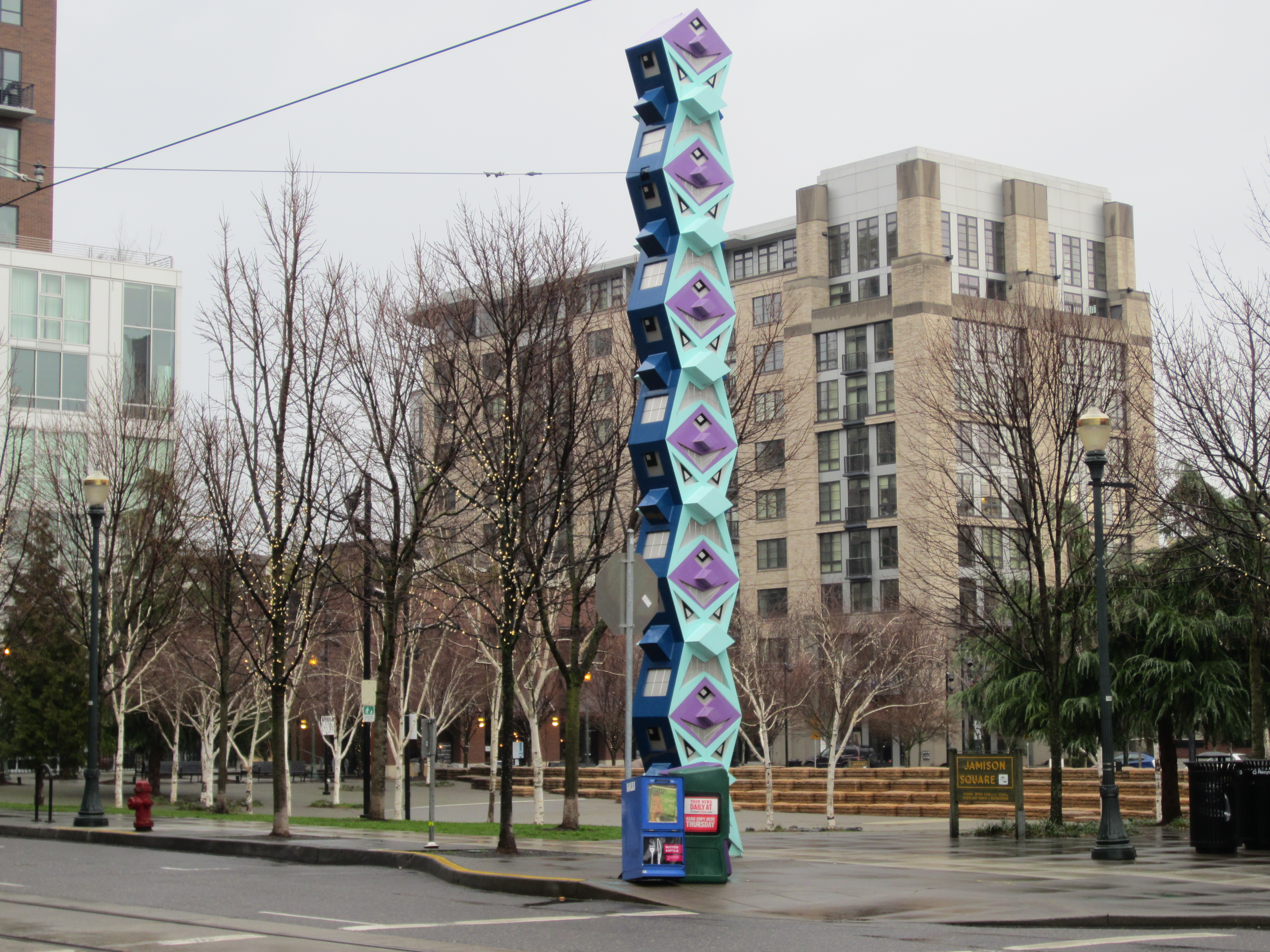
One of the totem poles that also function as support poles for the Portland Streetcar's overhead wire.

The four abstract painted aluminum totem poles each measure 30 feet (9.1 m), 1.75 inches (4.4 cm) x 40 inches (100 cm) x 42 inches (110 cm) and cover Portland Streetcar catenary poles (poles supporting trolley wires). According to Scharf, "These four Tiki Totem monikers are a fantasy come true. To realize something of this magnitude is beyond my wildest dreams. I love the way they relate to the Pacific Northwest culture as well as the universal Tiki culture, which extends from the South Pacific through the Northwest and up to Alaska. As I've said before, art should, above all, be fun, and these huge 3D forms translate that perfectly."

The totems were funded by the Pearl Arts Foundation. The works are part of the collection of the Regional Arts & Culture Council.

== See also ==
- 2001 in art
