= Pearl District, Portland, Oregon =

Neighborhood in Portland, Oregon, U.S.

Pearl District
- Neighborhood
- Location in Portland
- Coordinates: 45°31′48″N 122°40′53″W
- Country: United States
- State: Oregon
- City: Portland

Government
  - Association: Pearl District Neighborhood Association
  - Coalition: District Four Coalition

Area
  - Total: 0.47 sq mi (1.21 km^{2})

Population (2010)
  - Total: 5,997
  - Density: 12,800/sq mi (4,960/km^{2})

Housing
  - No. of households: 5315
  - Occupancy rate: 79% occupied
  - Owner-occupied: 1493 households (28%)
  - Renting: 2699 households (51%)
  - Avg. household size: 1.13 persons

The Pearl District is an area of Portland, Oregon, formerly occupied by warehouses, light industry and railroad classification yards and now noted for its art galleries, upscale businesses and residences. The area has been undergoing significant urban renewal since the mid-1980s when it was reclassified as mixed use from industrial, including the arrival of artists, the removal of a viaduct and construction of the Portland Streetcar. It now consists of industrial building conversion to offices, high-rise condominiums and warehouse-to-loft conversions.

The increase of high-rise condominiums and warehouse-to-loft conversions was made evident with the construction of the Cosmopolitan on the Park building, which opened in Summer 2016. The Cosmopolitan on the Park residential building is now the tallest building in the Pearl District and the 8th tallest building in Portland, contributing to the changing Portland skyline.

== Geography and features ==
The area is located just northwest of downtown between West Burnside Street on the south, the Willamette River on the north, NW Broadway on the east and the Interstate 405 freeway which crosses Fremont Bridge (Portland, Oregon) on the west.

The area is home to several Portland icons, including Powell's City of Books. The former Weinhard Brewery, which operated continuously from 1864 to September 1999, was shut down by Stroh's upon the purchase of the Weinhard's brand by Miller Brewing and sold for redevelopment as the Brewery Blocks.

There are art galleries and institutions, boutiques, and restaurants abound, and also a number of small clubs and bars.

The United States Post Office main processing facility for all of Oregon and southwestern Washington was built in the Pearl District in 1964, next to Union Station. This location was chosen in order for the post office to be able to better serve towns outside the Portland metro area.

The region is part of Portland's 4th City Council District, Multnomah County's District 1, Oregon Metro's 5th district, Oregon's 33rd House district, Oregon's 17th Senate district and Oregon's 1st congressional district.

=== Parks ===
The district includes most of the historic North Park Blocks (1869), as well as three public plazas:

- Jamison Square (2002) is built around a fountain which simulates a tidal pool that is periodically filled by artificial waterfalls and then drained into grating.
- Tanner Springs Park (2005) is a re-created natural area featuring wetlands, a walking trail, and creek.
- The Fields Park (2013) is a Neighborhood and Dog Park in the Northern part of the Pearl. The Park provides space for visual or performing arts, for community-building activities and has a large paved walking loop.

Once completed, it will also contain a section of the Green Loop.

=== Public Art ===
- Memory 99, a steel sculpture in the North Park Blocks commemorating the opening of the Pacific Northwest College of Art in 2012
- Never Look Away (mural)
- Dog Bowl (sculpture)
- Tikitotmoniki Totems
- Lovejoy Columns
- Nepenthes (sculpture)
- Artwall

== Demographics ==
In 2020 it was reported that 11,019 people lived in the Pearl District, comprising 7,191 households. This was an 84% increase from the 5,993 people reported living in the neighborhood in 2010. Of the 74% of people who identified as white on the 2020 census, 71% did not mark down an additional race. On the same census, 10.8% of people identified as Asian, 8.3% identified as Hispanic or Latino, 5.8% identified as Black or African American, 2.8% identified as American Indian or Alaskan Native, 0.5% identified as Native Hawaiian or Pacific Islander and 6.5% indicated some other race.

Of all Pearl District residents surveyed in 2020, 22% had moved to Portland over the past year, 100% had completed high school or a GED, 82% had broadband access, 8% reported experiencing a disability, and 18% struggled to put food on the table. It was also reported that 8% of the area was covered by tree canopy.

== History ==
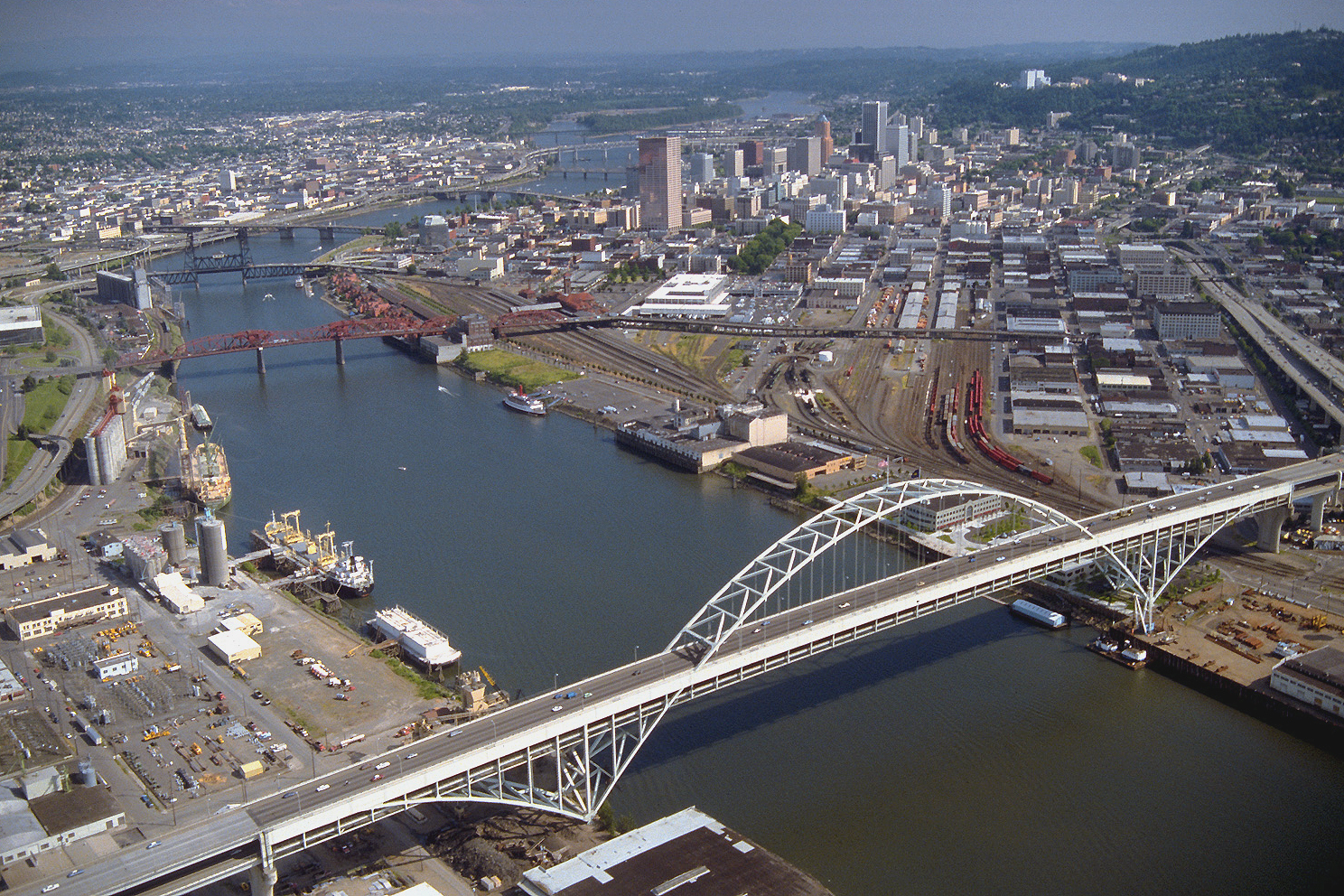
Aerial view from 1988, prior to redevelopment; the Pearl District lies in the center of the image.

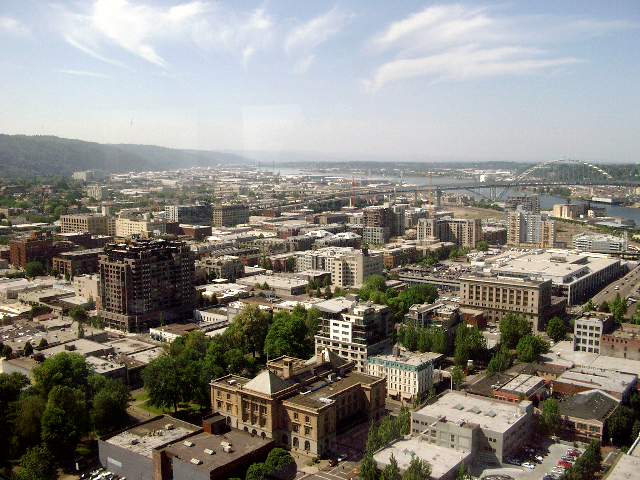
The Pearl District and surrounding area, as seen from the US Bancorp Tower

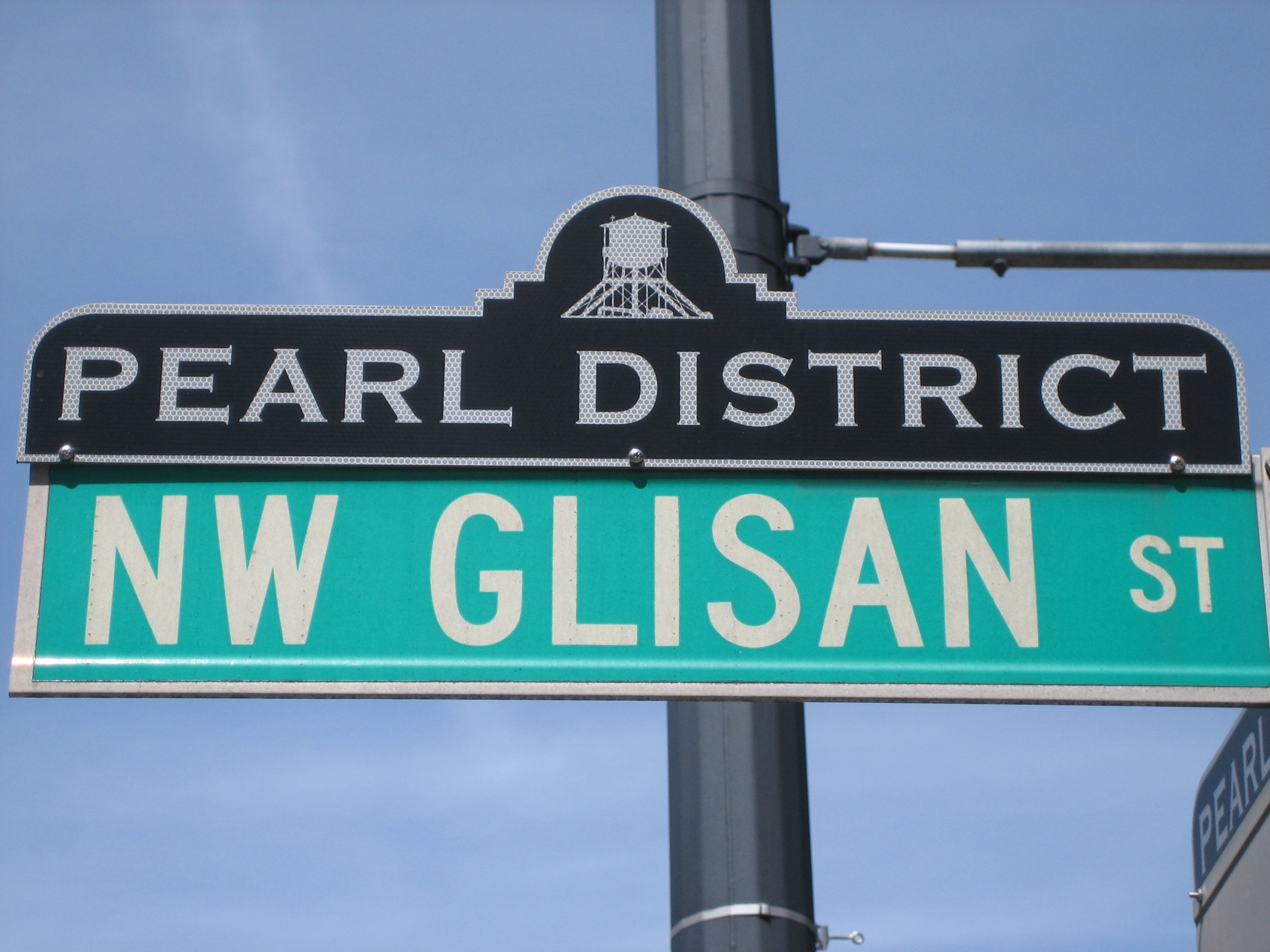
Pearl District street sign topper

The area was formerly used for warehousing, light industrial purposes and a railroad yard.

The Pearl District was first named in print in March 1987, in an article titled “The Pearl District” by Terry Hammond in The Rose Arts Magazine, a free local periodical in Portland. Marty Smith uncovered the origin story and corrected rumors in his humorous Dr. Know column in Willamette Week in January 2014. “Hammond says he wrote it with the express purpose of getting the name to stick.” He “stumped hard” for the name in the neighborhood while selling ads and distributing the paper.

At the time, the city was calling the area the Triangle, though the NW Triangle Planning District explicitly referred only to the railroad yards on the far side of NW Lovejoy Street. The NW Triangle Business Association for the area was calling it the Triangle, too, but found the name unsatisfactory, and recognized other options, like the Brewery District and others. An article in The Rose Arts Magazine presented the alternate names, and argued "The Pearl District" was best to refer to the treasury of art and artists inhabiting the interiors of so many of the crusty warehouses. The article included photos of the area and a map, and profiled individual artists with studios in several of the warehouses, including photographer Hiroshi Iwaya, glass artist Liz Mapelli, sculptor Martin Eichinger, ceramic artist Geoffrey Pagen, and silkscreen printers Elizabeth Harris and Russ Mahler.

Terry Hammond acknowledged in an endnote that the name "the Pearl" originated from Thomas Augustine of the Augustine Gallery, then located at NW 13th & Hoyt St. He tracked the progress of the name over the next two years, and reported in October 1989 the identity of the Pearl District “is now firmly established,” when he found investors adopted the name. The second Rose Arts article reported a brochure for the newly remodeled Irving Street Lofts, formerly the McKesson Building, named the area “Portland’s emerging Pearl District.” The building was the first converted warehouse up to code for residences.

The second news story showed another map of the district with 37 numbered locations indicating special events organized by local artists and businesses for the third annual Pearl Arts Festival. The editor gave the following series of Pearl landmarks: (a) Victoria Frey of Quartersaw Gallery, 528 NW 12th Ave., was enthusiastic about the name, and organized the first annual Pearl Arts Festival in September 1987, six months after the initial article; like others, she had not heard the name before, (b) Sunset Magazine picked up the story in January 1988, and adopted the name in quotation marks in the title as the "Pearl District," (c) The Oregonian daily newspaper first adopted the name in September 1988, at the time of the second annual Pearl Arts Festival, following the original Pearl District article in The Rose Arts Magazine with a map and profiles of some of the same artists, (d) Investors adopted the name in promotional materials as converted warehouses turned residential, starting in 1989.

In the 1990s, the Lovejoy Viaduct, an elevated portion of NW Lovejoy Street from the Broadway Bridge past NW 10th Avenue was demolished, opening dozens of surrounding blocks (including some brownfield sites) for development, which peaked in the 2000s. The viaduct was notable for the Lovejoy Columns, painted by a railroad watchman who worked below; two of them have been saved. The increasing density has attracted a mix of restaurants, brewpubs, shops, and art galleries. The movie Drugstore Cowboy (1989), by Gus Van Sant, has several scenes shot in the neighborhood.
