= Otters in Singapore =

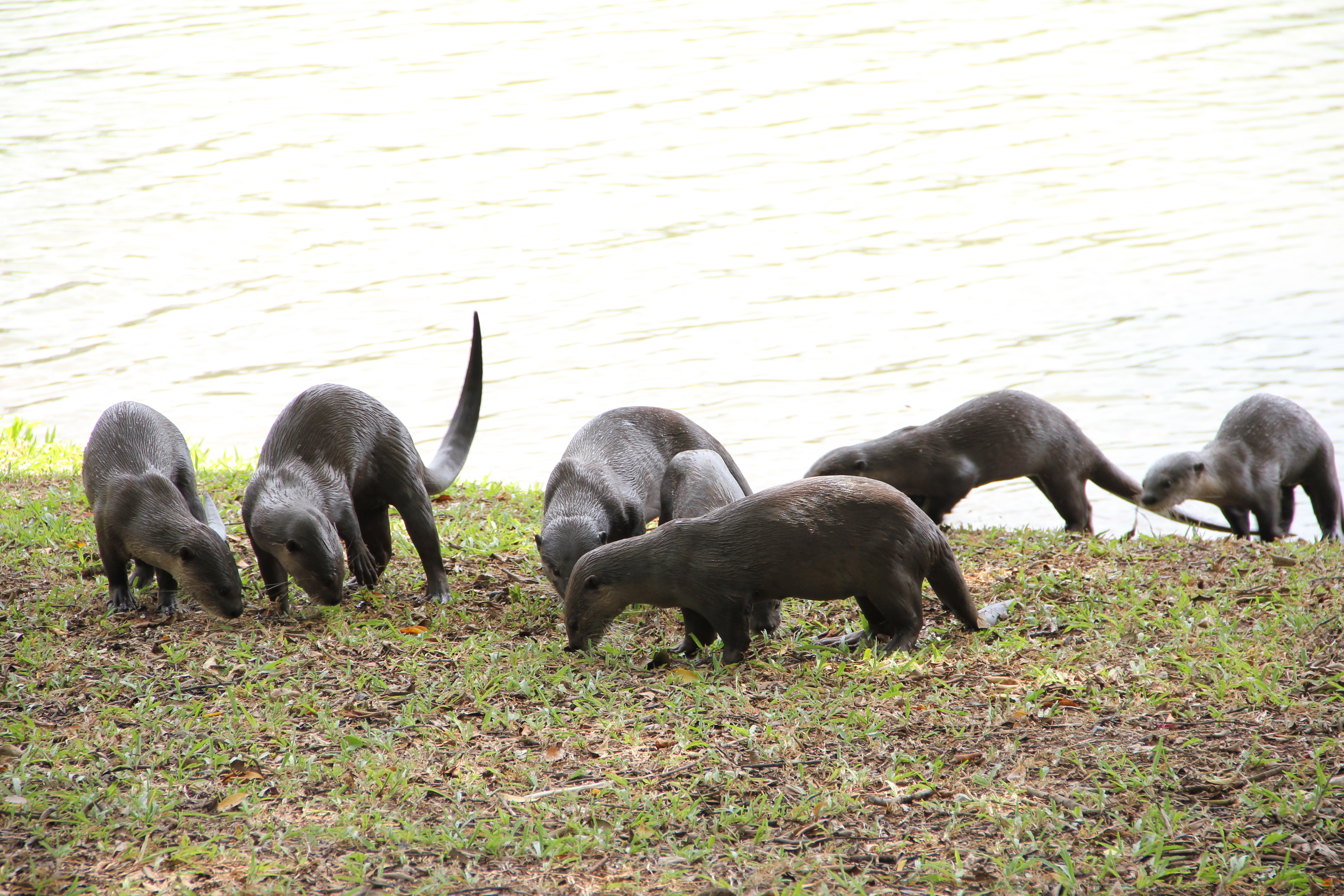
Otters near Jurong Lake in 2019

In Singapore, otters live within a heavily urbanised environment. Singapore historically had populations of at least Asian small-clawed otters and smooth-coated otters but all otter species became locally extinct in the 20th century. A repopulation of the island state by smooth-coated otters began in 1998, and accelerated in 2013. The growing otter population was seen as a success story for the greening of the city. Otters have become popular with the public, and have been adopted as national symbols.

This disappearance of otters in the 20th century was due to a combination of habitat destruction and pollution. The vast majority of Singapore's natural forest had been cleared, and many waterways were too polluted to support wildlife. Government efforts to improve the city's environment began in the late 1960s, and eventually saw many rivers cleaned and returned to a more natural state. Otters crossed the Straits of Johor from the Malay Peninsula to Singapore sporadically, but in 1998 a couple established itself permanently in the northwest. Others followed, settling in various locations on the northern coast. In 2013, otters were recorded migrating south, and they soon spread throughout most of the major waterways of the island.

Singapore's otters have become adapted to the urban landscape of the city. Unlike smooth-coated otter populations elsewhere, they are often tolerant of human presence. Otter families often nest in artificial environments, use stairs and ladders to enter and exit waterways, and use human infrastructure to travel both on land and in water. They are opportunistic feeders, eating food that is most common in their territories, and face few natural predators. Otter families are sometimes larger than those recorded elsewhere, and pups are recorded staying with their family longer than they do elsewhere. Multiple families have been observed with more than one simultaneously lactating female. The smooth-coated otters have been found to be hybrids with Asian small-clawed otters, although the origin of this is unknown. Some Asian small-clawed otters may also have returned, although they are restricted to mangroves and smaller islands.

Both otter species are protected by Singaporean law. Volunteer groups observe the otters, and the extensive popularity and recording of the otters has enabled the use of citizen science to conduct research. Human–otter conflict is rare, and otters are generally viewed positively by the public. An Otter Working Group (OWG) brings together the government, academics, and civil society organisations to conduct research and promote better human–otter relations. The success of Singapore's otters is viewed as a potential model for the success of urban otters elsewhere.

== Geographic background ==
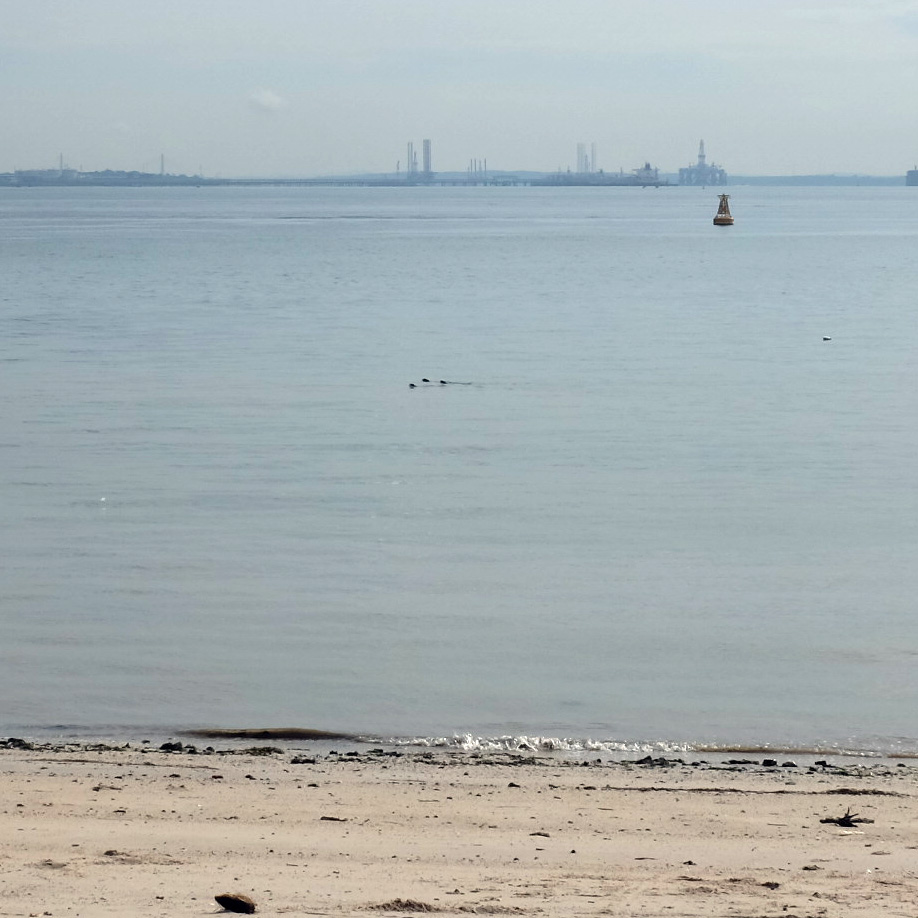
Otters swimming in the Straits of Johor, which separates Singapore from the mainland Malay Peninsula

Singapore consists of one main 728-square-kilometre (281 sq mi) island and 62 surrounding islands of various sizes. The Straits of Johor separate these islands from the mainland Malay Peninsula, and ranges in width from around 500 metres (1,600 ft) to 1,000 metres (3,300 ft). The strait is effectively divided into two by the Johor–Singapore Causeway. Only about 5% of Singapore's original natural environment remains, although about 56% of the country is covered in some form of greenery, including parks. Many of these managed green spaces occur alongside waterways.

The island has three main drainage basins: western, central (including the Downtown Core), and eastern (encompassing the northern and eastern coasts). Singapore has no natural lakes or large rivers, although artificial reservoirs have been created. Most large rivers are sealed at their mouths.

== History ==
=== Historic presence and disappearance ===
Historically, the Asian small-clawed otter was likely the most common species on Singapore. The smooth-coated otter was found in the region, but records from Singapore are limited. It may have mostly been a visitor to the island. Records of the hairy-nosed otter are difficult to confirm due to potential confusion with the smooth-coated otter. While there are Eurasian otters in other parts of Eurasia and to the south in Sumatra, there are no confirmed historical records for its presence in Singapore or the wider Malay Peninsula.

Otters are highly vulnerable to habitat destruction stemming from urbanisation. Pollution affects both otters and their prey. Furthermore, the modification of rivers can often create riverbanks unsuitable for otters, as they need to spend time on land. Large-scale deforestation of the island likely began only after the founding of modern Singapore in the early 19th century. An increase in agricultural production saw lowland and mangrove forests cleared for cash crops and aquaculture. By 1900, around 90% of the original forests were lost. Increasing pollution further damaged river ecosystems, and by the 1850s, some rivers were too polluted to support aquatic life. The island's otter population disappeared sometime before the 1960s. At this time, the island's mangroves were estimated to have been reduced to 1% of their former range. By 1990, all otter species were considered locally extinct. Some small-clawed otters were kept in Singapore Zoo.

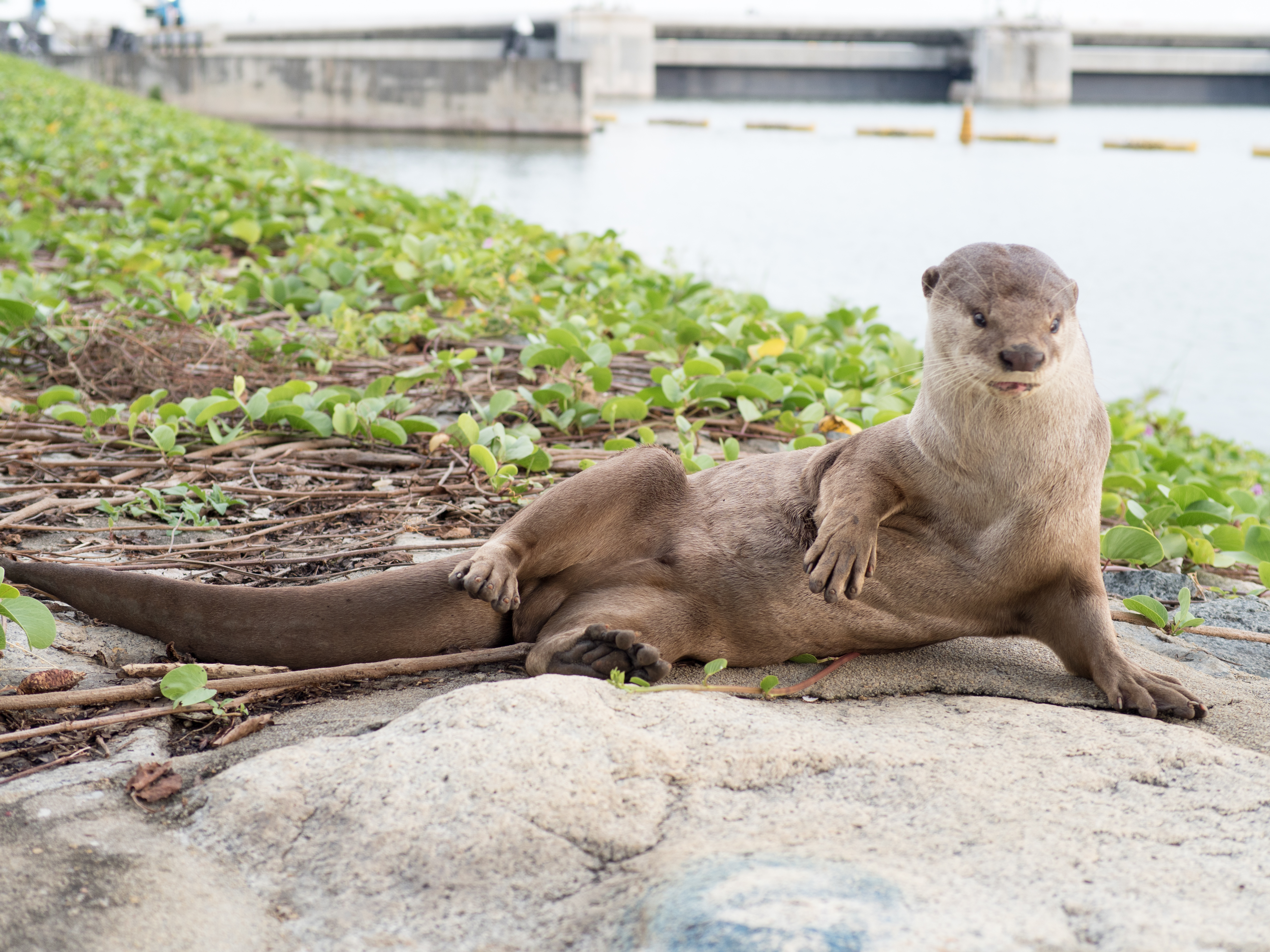
An otter in front of Marina Barrage, one of the many dams constructed around Singapore which turned its river mouths into freshwater lakes.

Following the independence of Singapore in 1965, rapid urbanisation saw natural forests and agricultural plantations cleared for buildings, while coastal development included land reclamation. Rivers and streams were canalised, and river mouths were dammed. However, significant government efforts to improve Singapore's environment began as early as 1967 with the introduction of the garden city vision, which included protecting some natural areas and creating urban parks. A large river cleanup effort took place from 1977 to 1987, which successfully rehabilitated the rivers into a state healthy enough to support wildlife. Later efforts to achieve a more eco-friendly city included remodifying some rivers to have a more natural flow, including in Bishan–Ang Mo Kio Park. Clean waterways were seen as a security necessity, in addition to having environmental benefits.

While mangrove areas had been mostly destroyed outside of a few northern pockets, the establishment of protected areas such as the Sungei Buloh Wetland Reserve meant habitats that might support otters were conserved. Development along the northern coast was common from the 1950s until the early 1990s, but slowed after that point, likely leading to more stable environments.

There were sporadic otter sightings along the northern coast, although it is likely these were visitors rather than residents. In 1989, two adults and at least three cubs were spotted on Pulau Tekong, probably Asian small-clawed otters. All Asian small-clawed otter sightings were in mangrove areas.

=== Repopulation ===
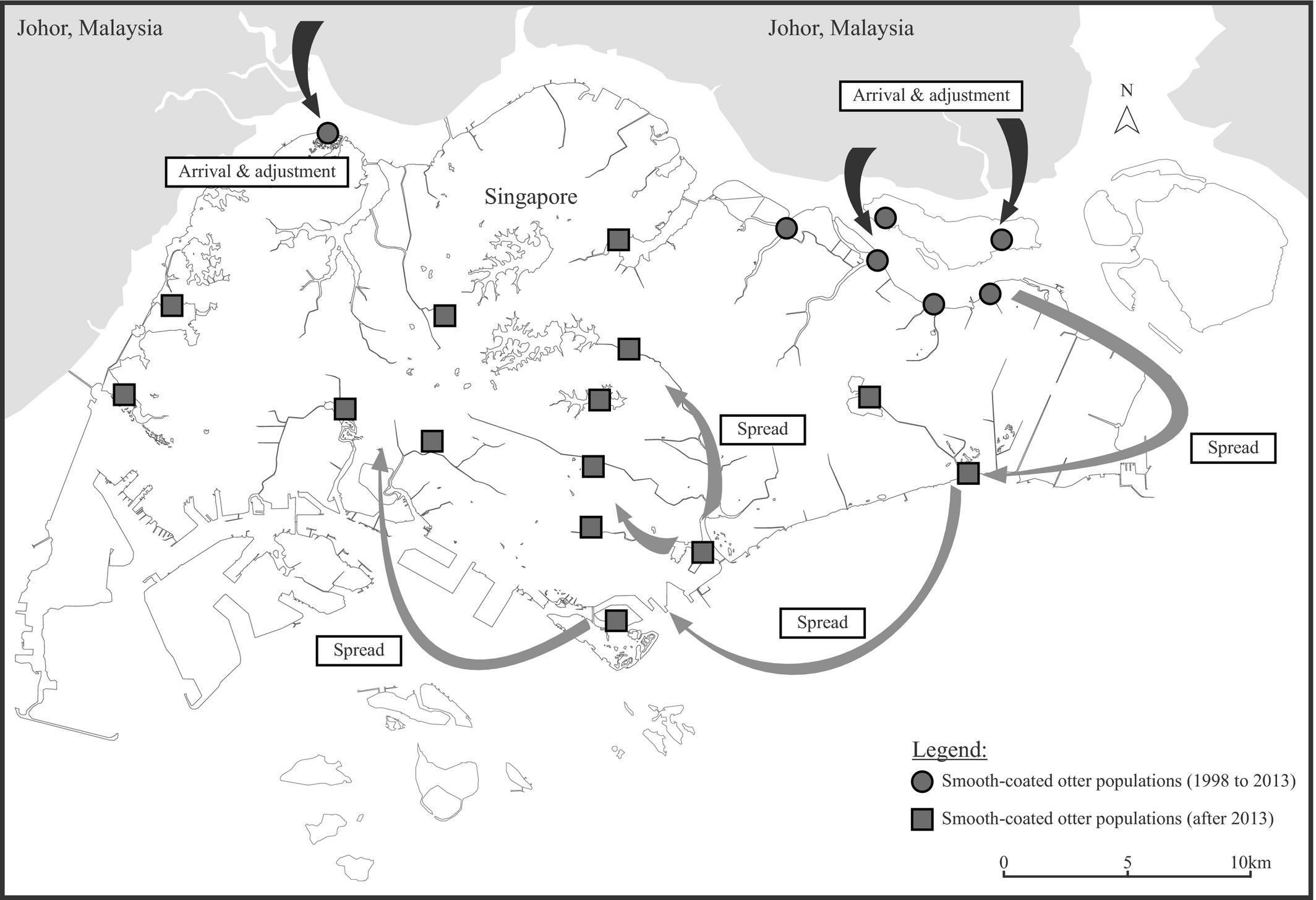
Smooth-coated otters migrated to Singapore in at least two separate events, before spreading throughout the country.

In 1998, smooth-coated otters were seen in Singapore's northwest, likely having crossed the Straits of Johor. This was likely a breeding pair that established themselves in the Sungei Buloh Wetland Reserve and raised pups. Juveniles were seen every year from 1999 to 2003, and again from 2009 to at least 2014. (The years 2004 to 2007 had very few sightings, although this was likely a result of sample bias rather than due to a disappearance of the otters.)

In 2007, smooth-coated otters were seen on the northeastern island of Pulau Ubin, likely originating from a separate crossing of the Straits of Johor. These crossings were possibly prompted by urbanisation in Johor driving the otters from their previous habitats. The otters were likely able to successfully adjust to their new environment as Singapore's northern coast retains some protected natural coastline. Juveniles were seen in Pulau Ubin most years following. Sightings in the east quickly went from sporadic to outnumbering sightings in the west, even as the absolute number of sightings in the west also grew. A 2010 sighting on the country's southern islands was the first recorded smooth-coated otter sighting from that area since 1938.

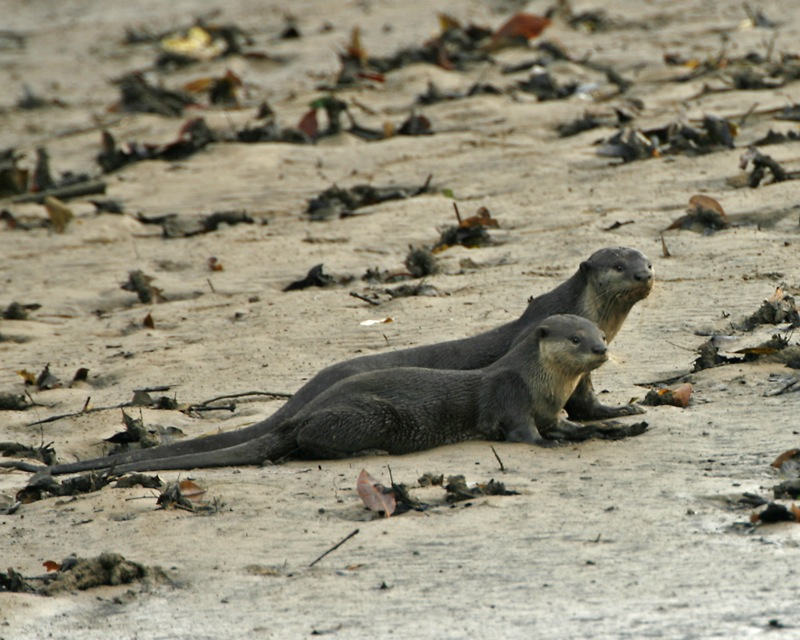
Otters at Sungei Buloh Wetland Reserve in 2006

Sightings were most frequently made at Sungei Buloh and at the Chek Jawa wetlands on Pulau Ubin. Initially, sightings were mostly restricted to areas near the coastline. However, in 2008 otter sightings began to occur in Sungei Punggol and Sungei Serangoon. These two rivers were in the process of being dammed, with Sungei Serangoon fully dammed in December 2009 and Sungei Punggol fully dammed in October 2010. Juveniles were first observed in what had become the Punggol Reservoir in 2011, and in Serangoon Reservoir in 2012. By 2012, a group of 13 lived in the Punggol Reservoir, the largest group known at that time.

Populations remained restricted to areas near the northern coast until 2013, after which smooth-coated otters spread into other waterways throughout the island. In 2014, recorded sightings in the south made up 48% of all sightings. That year also saw five pups spotted in the southern Marina Bay. The central watershed went from having few sightings in 2015, to having two resident groups in 2017, to five resident groups in 2021. A count in 2017 identified 79 individuals divided between 11 groups.

In 2019, pups were seen in the Singapore Botanic Gardens, in artificial ponds far from natural waterways. The otter population expanded significantly as they colonised new waterways, although by 2021 most of the waterways of the central drainage basin and parts of the eastern one were occupied. A survey around March 2021 found 170 individuals (including 35 pups) divided between 17 groups, plus further individuals and groups which were not confirmed. The group sizes ranged from 2 to 24. From 2019 to 2022, it is thought that the population doubled.

== Ecology ==
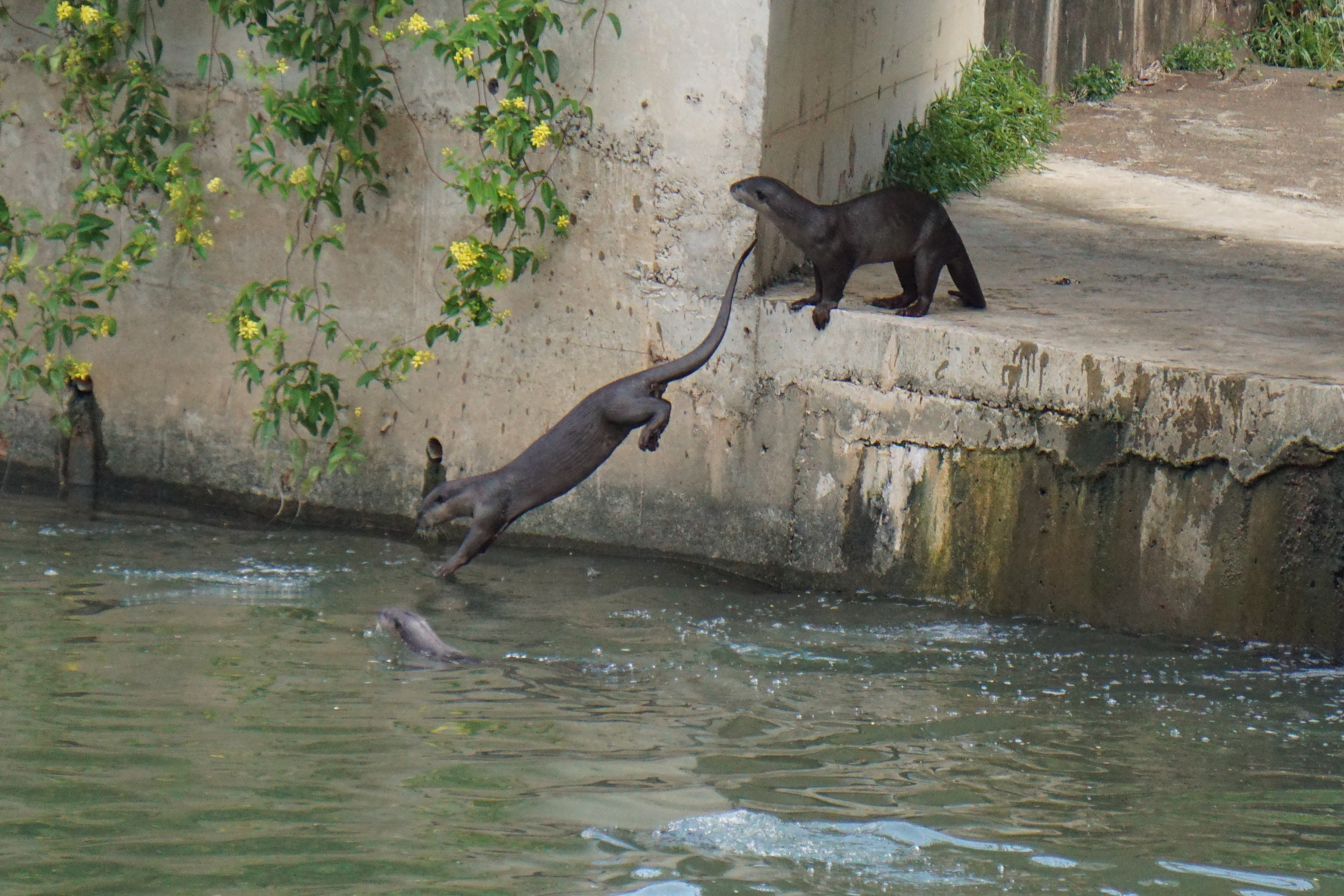
The otters are able to navigate the urban environment

Singapore is highly urbanised and has a highly modified environment. Mangrove forests cover 0.11% of the country, old-growth forests 0.16%, swamp forests 0.39%, and secondary forest 21.01%. Many rivers are canalised and barraged. While smooth-coated otters naturally inhabit wetlands and rivers whose banks have a lot of vegetation, populations have adapted to more human-modified landscapes in many locations. Otters in Singapore have been sighted in mangroves, brackish water, reservoirs, sandy beaches, and urban areas. Some northern populations may have ranges that extend across the Straits of Johor. Increased focus by the government on improving the urban environment, including better pollution management and expanding green spaces, has created more areas otters can inhabit.

While some otter groups still live mostly on the coast, others have established territories fully within modified waterways. Urban otters have learned to nest in artificial hollows, such as gaps underneath buildings. Otters use stairs to climb otherwise inaccessible riverbanks, and have even been seen using ladders. While smooth-coated otters are usually shy, many in Singapore are tolerant of human presence to the point of indifference. Where wild populations elsewhere tend to groom on sand, urban populations in Singapore are known to rest on grass and even concrete. Some of these adaptations, such as using artificial holts and traversing steep river banks using ladders, are the first known instances for smooth-coated otters, although they have been observed in other species. The Zouk family and the Singapore Botanic Gardens family are known to use roads to travel between isolated water bodies, possibly due to being outcompeted on the main waterways.

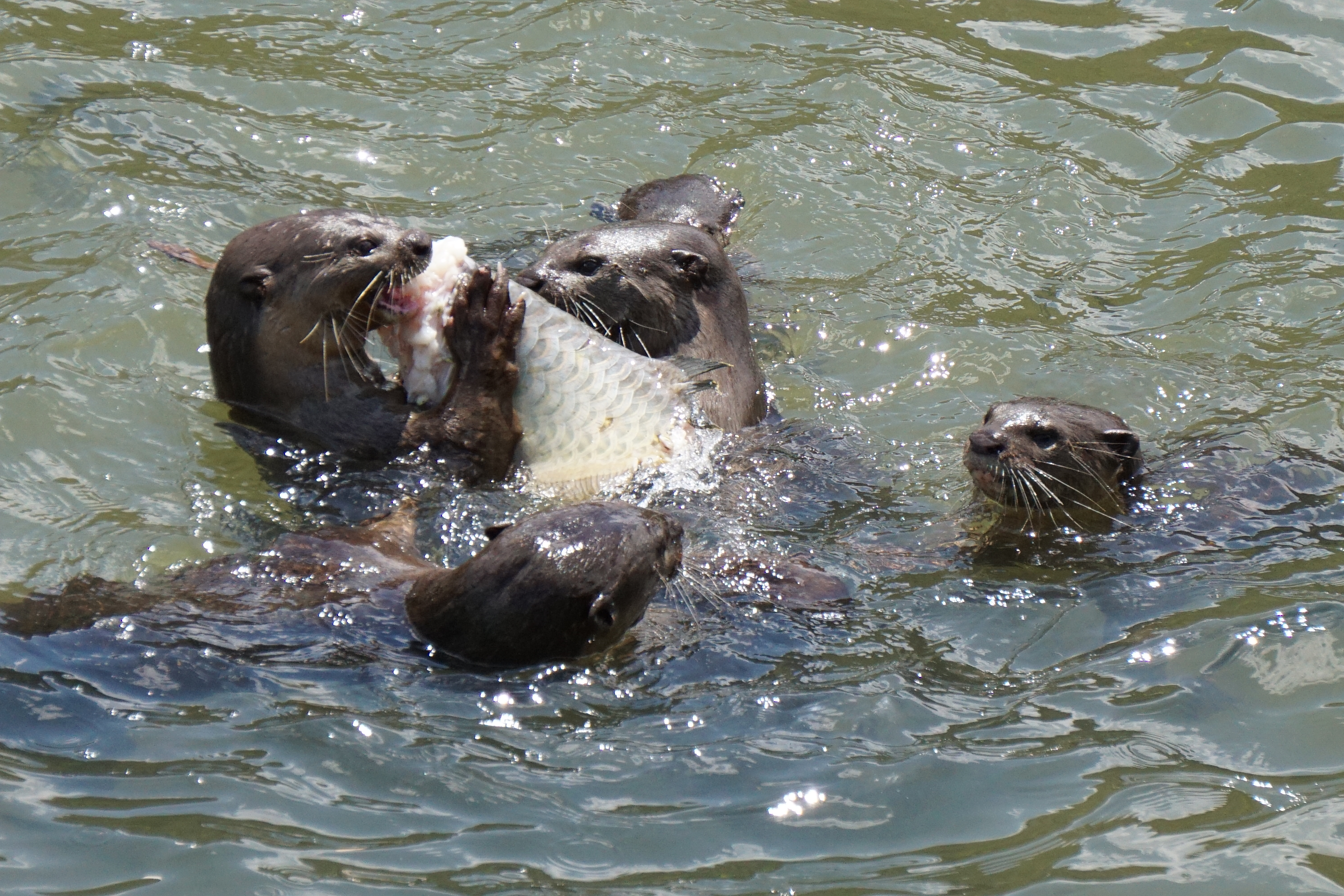
Fish are a common food source for the otters

Singapore's otter populations have proven to be opportunistic feeders. While in coastal areas they have been seen mostly eating coastal fish, they eat prawns near areas of aquaculture, and introduced fish in artificial reservoirs. In Sungei Buloh, a former prawn-farming area, otter diets appear to be near 70% fish and 30% or more prawns. Individuals have been observed eating the sagor catfish tail first, before discarding the difficult-to-eat head and spines. In areas near flathead grey mullet farms, these mullets can make up around 19% of an otter's diet. Across the entire northern shore, cichlid fish make up the majority of diets. In artificial reservoirs where introduced fish species are dominant, cichlids constitute over 90% of diets. While otter families usually forage together as a group, when young pups are in a holt one adult stays behind.

Each otter family has its own defined and relatively stable territory. Territories may overlap at their edges, although these regions may be used at different times. Territorial "otter wars" have occurred between families coming into contact. From January to August 2020, four groups (Bishan, Marina, Zouk, and Singapore Botanic Garden) had territories within the central watershed. During this period at least 19 interactions between groups were recorded, which often resulted in one group withdrawing from the area of conflict. Such conflicts do occasionally result in deaths, including of pups.

Otter families reuse the same holts in these territories across multiple years. Families may move between holts as frequently as every three days, although when there is a late-stage pregnancy the same holt is used for a longer time. Pups may intermittently join foraging until they are about 10 weeks old, at which point the whole family forages together as normal. The Bishan family was recorded travelling almost 9 kilometres (5.6 mi) in one day in 2016.

Observations of the Bishan and Marina families found that the usual birthing period was from October to May, with pups emerging from their holts for the first time (and thus usually observed for the first time) around six weeks after birth. There are a number of observed instances of multiple breeding females in the same family. This was first observed in the Bishan otter family in 2017. While some instances may have resulted in infanticide due to reproductive conflict, and the temporary eviction of some females, others appear to have resulted in allomothering in which both the dominant matriarch and a subordinate nurse all current pups. The emergence of this behaviour may be a result of the surrounding urban conditions, notably a very high level of food availability and very few threats, although such behaviour has also been observed in rural India and may be more common than assumed.

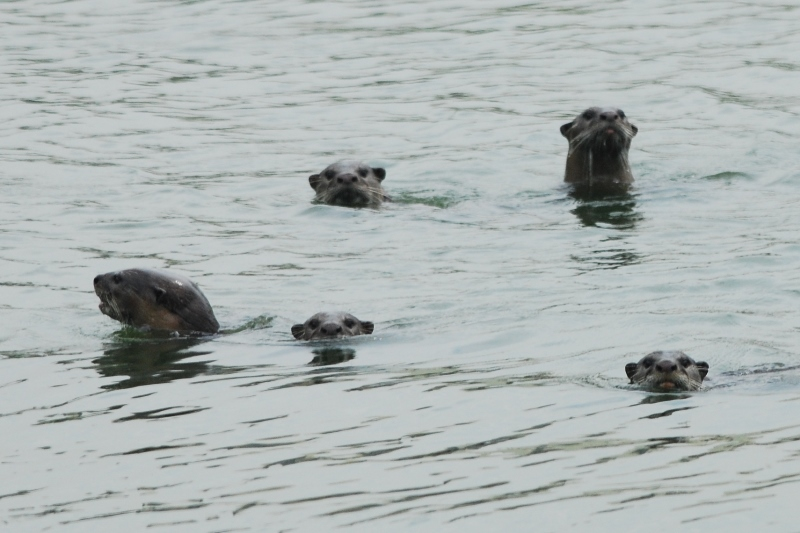
Otters in Sungei Serangoon in 2013

The large group sizes are higher than those of smooth-coated otters observed elsewhere, where the highest recorded is 16. Possible explanations for these group sizes include a large number of pups, a lack of available habitat for dispersal, and abundant resources. Pups have been observed staying with parents for up to four years, whereas elsewhere they usually leave after two. Individuals have been observed leaving their family for lengthier periods before leaving completely.

While in the northwest there is some danger from crocodiles, most otter groups face no natural predators. One family of six otters was observed working together to drive off a crocodile in the Sungei Buloh Wetland Reserve. Asian water monitors are a threat to pups, but not adults. Both otters and monitors are semi-aquatic predators, so monitors also compete for the same food, sometimes stealing or scavenging otter kills. The presence of pups makes adult otters more aggressive towards monitors, with greater aggression when pups outnumber adults. Otters have been observed drowning and eating monitor lizards.

A genetic study of smooth-coated otters found that at least some of the Singaporean population appear to have maternal DNA from an Asian small-clawed otter. This is the first known case of otter hybridisation in the wild. It is unknown how long ago this hybridisation happened, or how widespread it may be. Asian small-clawed otters remain restricted to the mangroves of smaller islands. They are likely less tolerant of human presence than smooth-coated otters.

== Human interactions ==
Within Singapore the smooth-coated otter is still considered critically endangered. The Wildlife Act 1965 banned the capture and killing of otters, and the Wild Animals and Birds Act of 1965 banned harming through cruelty. Amendments in 2020, along with the passing of the Wildlife (Protection Wildlife Species) Rules 2020 legislation, increased protection and enforcement. Both otter species are protected in the wild, although there are exceptions for actions taken on private land.

In 2013, an Otter Working Group (OWG) was tentatively established, and it became a formal body in 2016. Its membership included government departments, the National University of Singapore, Mandai Wildlife Group, an NGO, and public otter enthusiasts. This body undertakes public engagement to reduce the potential for human–otter conflict, and provides education regarding the best ways to observe otters. The OWG receives public reports about dead otters, and some of its members carry out necropsies when possible. It works closely with the OtterWatch volunteer group, which undertakes community outreach. OtterWatch campaigns encourage proper human–otter interactions, and the group has opposed initiatives for otter culling that have been raised after biting incidents.

The appearance of otters in Bishan–Ang Mo Kio Park and Marina Bay brought their return to widespread public attention. Otters are a charismatic species that have received widespread public interest, including the establishment of community groups that document daily otter activity. The activity of individual otter families has also attracted mainstream media attention, turning the otters into local celebrities. The Bishan otter family was chosen by readers of The Straits Times as a suitable icon for National Day in 2016, winning 40% of the vote.

Otters are viewed positively compared to other prominent wildlife species, and their presence is viewed by some Singaporeans as improving quality of life. Residents who encounter them on private property are likely to leave them alone as opposed to seeking to remove them, and many will report injured otters. Singapore became the top country for Google searches relating to otters by 2023. The otters have also attracted international touristic attention, becoming symbols of Singapore's Garden city vision.

Lutrogale perspicillata
English	Smooth-coated otter
Malay	Berang-berang, Memerang, Bulu Lichin
Chinese	滑鼻獭; huabita

Aonyx cinereus
English	Oriental small-clawed otter
Malay	Berang-berang Kechil, Memerang Kechil
Chinese	小爪獭; xiao zhao ta

The government has promoted otters as a conservation icon. The Agri-Food and Veterinary Authority of Singapore adopted an otter mascot named Oscar in 2002, as otters are known to wash their food before eating. The People's Association government body started using a mascot named Ottie in 2016 to promote environmental conservation. The National Parks Board has touted otters as examples of the success of their park regeneration efforts. The successful colonisation of areas as urban as the city centre means that Singapore may serve as a potential model for other cities where historical otter populations are decreasing or have disappeared. Some lessons have already been adopted by urban otter observers in Kuala Lumpur and Kinmen.

The domestic popularity of the otters, which leads to their activities being monitored by the public every day, combined with the otters' relative comfort around humans, has allowed for detailed monitoring of group structures. Public access to smartphones has also ensured sightings are often very well documented, and a dedicated app has been created to record sightings. Singapore conducted an otter census in 2017, to obtain data such as a population count, identify usual habits, and track litter sizes. A second census was conducted in 2021, and a third in 2024. These censuses rely on photo or video evidence, with multiple sightings needed to confirm a group and care taken to avoid double-counting. Some individual otters can be recognised due to unique injuries. It is otherwise hard to distinguish between them. The large number of observers and the regular capture of video enables the study of Singaporean otters through citizen science. Some families have been monitored closely enough that the growth of every brood is known.

There is no large fishing industry in Singapore, which is a common sector for human-otter conflict. Some conflict has arisen due to otters fishing from private ponds. In 2015, otters were accused of eating SG$80,000 worth of koi in Sentosa Cove. One church reported almost 100 fish eaten from its pond.

Otters can halt traffic when crossing roads. Being hit by vehicles is the most common recorded cause of death, although this may be due to such deaths being the easiest to observe. Vehicle collisions have occurred not only near waterways, but in inland areas distant from waterways. At least one nature reserve has installed cameras to alert drivers to otter presence. Otter deaths have also been recorded from fish trap entanglement, including the first recorded human-caused death, which was due to heat stroke while trapped in an illegal fish trap in 2017. At least one pup has been killed by a fish hook. Interactions with feral dogs have been observed, but these saw the otters generally leave or deter the dogs from attacking. There have been no recorded instances of poaching since the return of otters to the country. Construction work can alter urban otter habitats, cutting off parts of their range. Human activity can also destroy holts or make them otherwise inaccessible. When otters interrupted the Singapore Marathon in 2016, volunteer otter watchers separated the otters from runners.

There is at least one record of an otter biting a child, likely due to the otter being surrounded by a crowd. In 2021, an old man was bitten while jogging, and a tourist in the Botanic Gardens was chased and bitten multiple times. The large surge in population has led the government to attempt relocating some otters. The first relocation took place in October 2022, when six otters living under a pedestrian path in a housing estate in Seletar were moved to an undisclosed location. This was stated as part of a new policy that otters in residential areas, where it was deemed they could not access natural resources, would be moved.

== Notable families ==
Singaporean otter families (also called "romps") are often assigned names relating to the location they were first found. The Bishan and Marina families were the first to reach wide public awareness, and the Zouk family later became similarly well-known. The ranges of each family can overlap.

=== Bishan ===
The Bishan family was first identified in 2014 in the Bishan–Ang Mo Kio Park. This park encompasses 3 kilometres (1.9 mi) of the Kallang River, which was restored to a natural state in 2012. It is located on the inland side of the Central watershed. The initial two adults seen in December 2014 were joined by three pups in April 2015. In February 2016, five new pups were seen, although one adult left the group (either through death or dispersal) by September 2016. Another adult disappeared by December 2016, although five new pups were born. An adult disappeared in April 2017, and a pup died in June 2017. Another adult disappeared by November 2017, although seven new pups were born. The matriarch had her fourth litter in late 2017 and her seventh litter in late 2020.

Beginning in 2015, the Bishan group moved to the Marina Bay area, displacing the Marina family. Both families continued to come into conflict as they competed over parts of the central watershed. At least two other families were also present at this time, although the Bishan family was the most dominant, likely as it was the largest. From 2017 to 2021 they were observed in the Kallang Basin. However, their core territory remained the Marina Reservoir, with occasional forays into the Bishan–Ang Mo Kio Park (which contains part of the Kallang River) and the Singapore River.

The Bishan family was the first to be observed with multiple lactating females, when both its matriarch and a subordinate female named "Crazy Sis" were observed with pups in 2017. Subsequent reproductive conflict led to possibly the first recorded smooth-coated otter case of familial infanticide. In 2019, the matriarch was temporarily forced out. In early 2021, the matriarch and two subordinates were lactating at the same time, supporting five pups. The family size at this time was 22 otters. This is one of the largest family sizes observed. The Bishan family are used to human observers, and are thought to be one of the most photographed families. The Bishan family was chosen by readers of The Straits Times as a national icon in 2016.

=== Marina ===
The Marina family was first identified in 2014 in the Marina Reservoir, near the coast of the Central Watershed. The two adults spotted in January 2014 were joined by five pups in June. One individual left the group by April 2015. In May 2016 there were five adults, however they were joined by four more pups, one of which died by August. An adult disappeared by January 2017. Five new pups were seen in April 2017, although two pups and one adult died in June. Three more adults disappeared by October 2017. The adult that died on 8 June was known as Ah Huat, and was the seven-year-old patriarch of the group. Shortly after his death, members of the Singaporean public defending the remaining Marina family from the Bishan family caused debate about the extent to which the public should interfere with the otters.

The Marina family was displaced from Marina Bay by the Bishan otter family in 2015. They were later seen in other areas of the East Coast and Singapore River, before settling in the Bishan–Ang Mo Kio Park, formerly the home of the Bishan family. Both families continued to come into conflict as they competed over parts of the central watershed. The two families became the most well-known in the city. In 2018, the Marina family lived in the Upper Peirce Reservoir. In 2020, the Marina family was based in the Bishan–Ang Mo Kio Park.

The Marina family at times travelled back towards areas such as the Kallang Basin, while the Bishan family has travelled upriver. Both the Bishan and Marina families grew quite large. One fight in 2020 saw the 15 members of the Bishan family fight 11 members of the Marina family. Otter observers have analysed the fight strategies used by the two families. One Marina pup is thought to have died due to a fight with the Bishan family in 2017.

=== Zouk ===
The Zouk family was named due to being first identified near the Zouk nightclub, as a family of six living under the Jiak Kim Bridge. They later moved to the Singapore Botanic Gardens. The male may have come from the Marina family, while the two females came from the Bishan family. Their travels brought them into conflict with other groups. Likely in search of a new home range, in early 2020 they were seen in a variety of urban locations in Singapore. Some of these areas were significant distances from bodies of water. They were occasionally seen in the Singapore River and Kallang River, however they generally avoided large water bodies. Their movement during this time has been described as "nomadic", between small water bodies such as ponds and travelling along roads. Observations in 2020 found that the Zouk group was the only otter family studied to quickly withdraw from fights, sometimes without any vocalisation.

In December 2020, the Zouk matriarch and her daughter, Flowerhead, lactated at the same time, jointly supporting seven pups, although it is unknown whether both gave birth. This was the largest number of pups known from any family during this period. By 2022 the group had reached 14 members. The second of the original two females eventually left the family and settled down with a mate, before dying in October 2023. In June 2024, the original male of the group was forced out, and the original mother was found dead on 28 June. After both left the family, a new otter was observed with the family. The remaining family of 17 otters may have broken apart following this.

Zouk adults have been observed teaching pups to hunt, such as pushing fish towards the shoreline to make hunting for the pups easier. This significantly reduced the hunting productivity of the adults. The family was regarded as exceptionally tolerant of humans, and strongly bonded. Ottercity referred to Zouk mum as having found "a soulmate" in Zouk dad. The family was filmed for three weeks for the 2024 BBC documentary Mammals narrated by David Attenborough.

=== Singapore Botanic Gardens ===
The Singapore Botanic Gardens family was formed by two female otters from the Marina family and an unknown male. In November 2019, both sisters gave birth around the same time. While the presumed dominant sister had only one pup, the subordinate had three. As of 2020, this family lived in the Singapore River, while often moving between small water bodies, such as ponds. As of 2020, the family consisted of four adults with no pups.

=== Other ===
In mid-2019, the Pandan family had multiple lactating females, with nine adults and nine pups total. The family reached 22 individuals at one point, one of the largest observed. Other families that have been identified include Bedok Reservoir, Pasir Ris Changi, Anchorvale, Halus, Hougang, Lower Seletar, Punggol, Sungei Buloh A, Sungei Buloh B, Sentosa, Jurong Lake Garden, Pulau Ubin, Zouk Aunt BF, and Changi Bay Point.
