= Zouk otter family =

Singapore urban wildlife

The Zouk family, or Zouk group, was a Singaporean otter family formed by a male from the Marina family and two females from the Bishan otter family. They were named after the Zouk nightclub, which they lived near in late 2018. The family grew in size over the next few years, coming into conflict with other otter families in Singapore's central watershed. The subordinate original female left the family before 2020. The original male was forced out of the family in June 2024, and his mate died shortly afterwards. The group may have broken up following the loss of the original pair.

The Zouk family was very tolerant of human presence, even for otters in Singapore. They gained attention for what was seen as a nomadic lifestyle, regularly moving between small and sometimes artificial water bodies, often over land. This may have been due to conflict with other otter families who occupied major waterways in the area. The family was unusually quick to withdraw from confrontations, sometimes without even making vocalisations. The family was filmed for three weeks as part of a BBC Wildlife documentary that aired in 2024.

== History ==
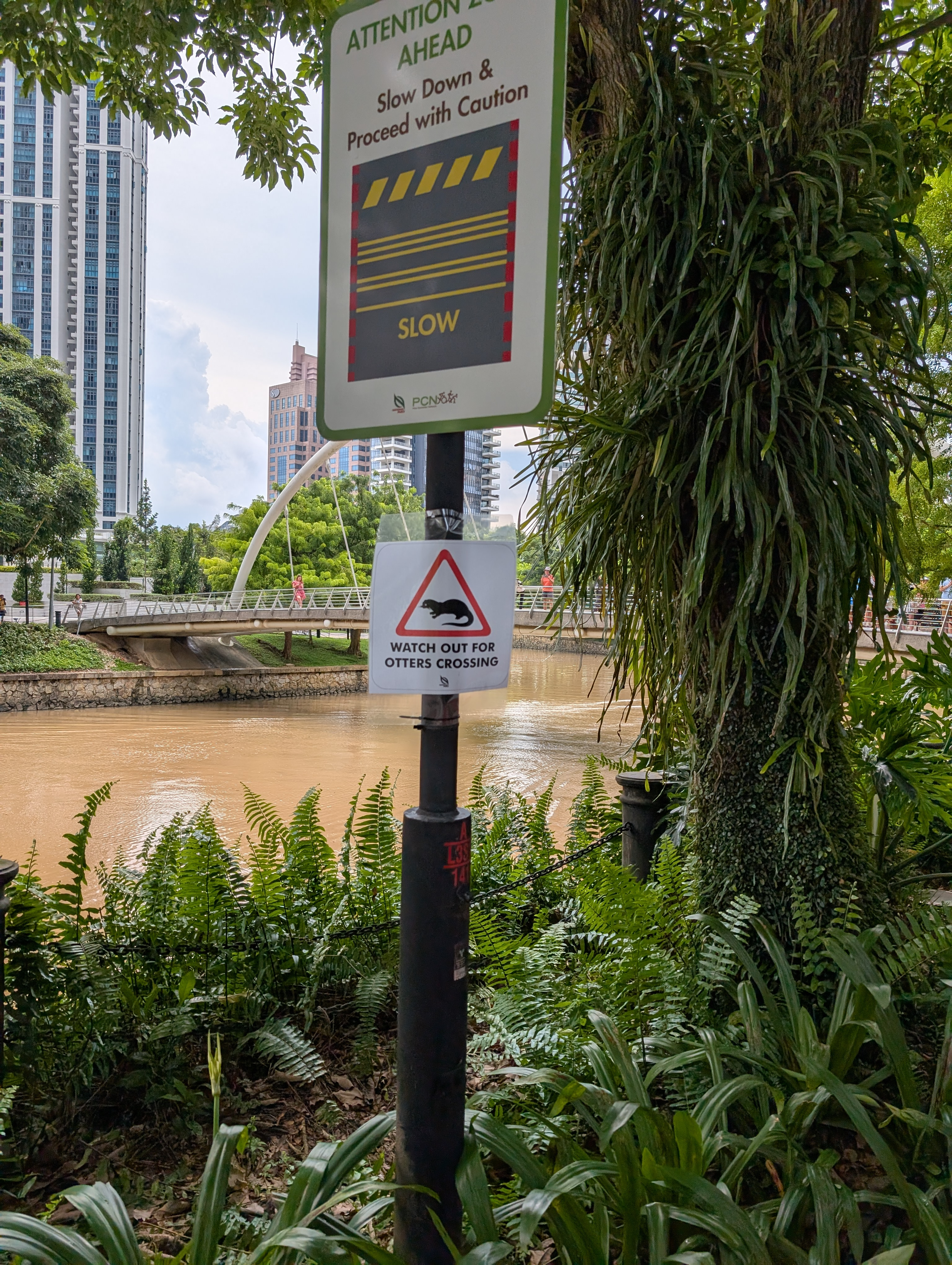
The Zouk family was named while living under the Jiak Kim Bridge

The Zouk family was named in late 2018 due to being first identified living under the Jiak Kim Bridge, which was near the Zouk nightclub. At the time it was a family of six. The adult male, who was the father of the initial pups, likely came from the well-known Marina family when that family was living in Kampong Java Park. The adult female who became the mother of the pups was from the Bishan otter family. The two became known as Zouk dad and Zouk mum. The second of the original adult females, known as Zouk Aunt, was the sister of Zouk mum and also from the Bishan family.

The family later moved to the Singapore Botanic Gardens. From the Singapore Botanic Gardens the Rochor River may have provided a means of travel. The three adults and three juveniles were seen in June 2019 on Anson Road in the Downtown Core, possibly having found their way there through drains or canals. Later that month, Zouk Aunt went missing, while Zouk mum was seen with injuries. One pup was observed left alone in 2019, and died of starvation. Their travels brought them through territory also used by the Bishan family and the Marina family.

Likely in a further search for a new home range, in early 2020 they were seen in a variety of urban locations in Singapore, including a condominium pool in the Newton area, the Tan Tock Seng Hospital, a petrol station on Bukit Timah Road, the pavement and road near the Mustafa Centre, and the KK Women's and Children's Hospital. This last hospital is near the Kampong Java Park that the father is thought to have come from, although it had closed in 2018. Some of these areas were a significant distance from bodies of water. Most were in the central watershed, although they were observed at least once further west. The family were occasionally seen in the Singapore River and the Bishan–Ang Mo Kio Park/Kallang River, however they generally avoided large water bodies. Their entry into Bishan–Ang Mo Kio Park brought them into conflict with the resident Marina family.

By 2020 Zouk Aunt had left the family and lived together with a mate. Over time the pair had four pups. Two were killed in otter fights in 2021, while a third was killed by traffic in 2022. Zouk Aunt died of an infection at seven years old in October 2023.

In December 2020 Zouk mum and her daughter "Flowerhead" lactated at the same time, jointly supporting seven pups. It is unknown whether the pups were born to one or both of them. This was the largest number of pups known from any family during this period. This allomothering may be an adaptation to the urban environment, which contains substantial food. By 2022 the group had reached 14 members. In 2021, a tourist was attacked by otters at the Botanic Gardens. The otters involved are thought to have been the Zouk family. This was an unprecedentedly aggressive otter attack in Singapore, possibly triggered by a human runner approaching the otters.

The family was filmed for three weeks for the 2024 BBC documentary Mammals narrated by David Attenborough. This filming caught the separation of one member of the family from the rest by a road. The solo otter was filmed moving between regular family haunts, before finally reuniting with the others. The 14 members of the family were first observed by the film crew emerging from The Istana.

In June 2024 the original male of the group was forced out, likely by an external male. The original mother was absent from the family in the following days, being last seen by observers on 21 June. She was found dead on 28 June, not far from the remaining family, having lived about eight years. Zouk mum's death was assessed as being due to natural causes. Both the Zouk dad and Zouk mum were observed with injuries in the preceding weeks, possibly due to fights with external otters observed trailing the family. After both left the family, a new otter was observed with the family. Zouk dad was observed in July 2024 alone at the Botanic Gardens, with several injuries. The remaining family of 17 otters may have broken apart following the loss of their founding pair.

== Lifestyle ==
Their movement during this time has been described as "nomadic", between small water bodies such as ponds and travelling along roads. It is possible that the Zouk group had attempted to move into larger waterways, but were rebuffed by other families. The central watershed was also occupied by the Bishan family, Marina family, and Singapore Gardens family, who, unlike the Zouk family, had established core territories in large bodies of water. Observations in 2020 found that the Zouk group was the only otter family studied to quickly withdraw from fights. They were observed multiple times approaching another group, but then retreating without even offering any vocalisation. They were the only family to display such withdrawal tendencies.

During the filming of the BBC documentary, the film crew noted individual personalities among the family, including that the Zouk dad usually crossed roads first, while the Zouk mum kept track of the wider family. The group's territorial patrols meant they regularly moved through areas with people, to which they showed little notice. One member of Singapore's Otter Working Group stated in 2022 that the Zouk family was the most human-tolerant of all of Singapore's otter families.

Zouk adults have been observed teaching pups to hunt, pushing fish towards the shoreline. The time spent carrying out such teaching significantly reduced the hunting productivity of the adults. The popular family was viewed as strongly bonded with each other. The Ottercity otter watching group referred to Zouk mum as having found "a soulmate" in the Zouk dad.
