= Draisaitl =

Draisaitl is a surname. Notable people with the surname include:

- Peter Draisaitl (born 1965), Czech-born German ice hockey player and coach
- Leon Draisaitl (born 1995), German ice hockey player, son of Peter

== See also ==
- Herbert Dreiseitl
