= Artwall =

Sculpture in Portland, Oregon, U.S.

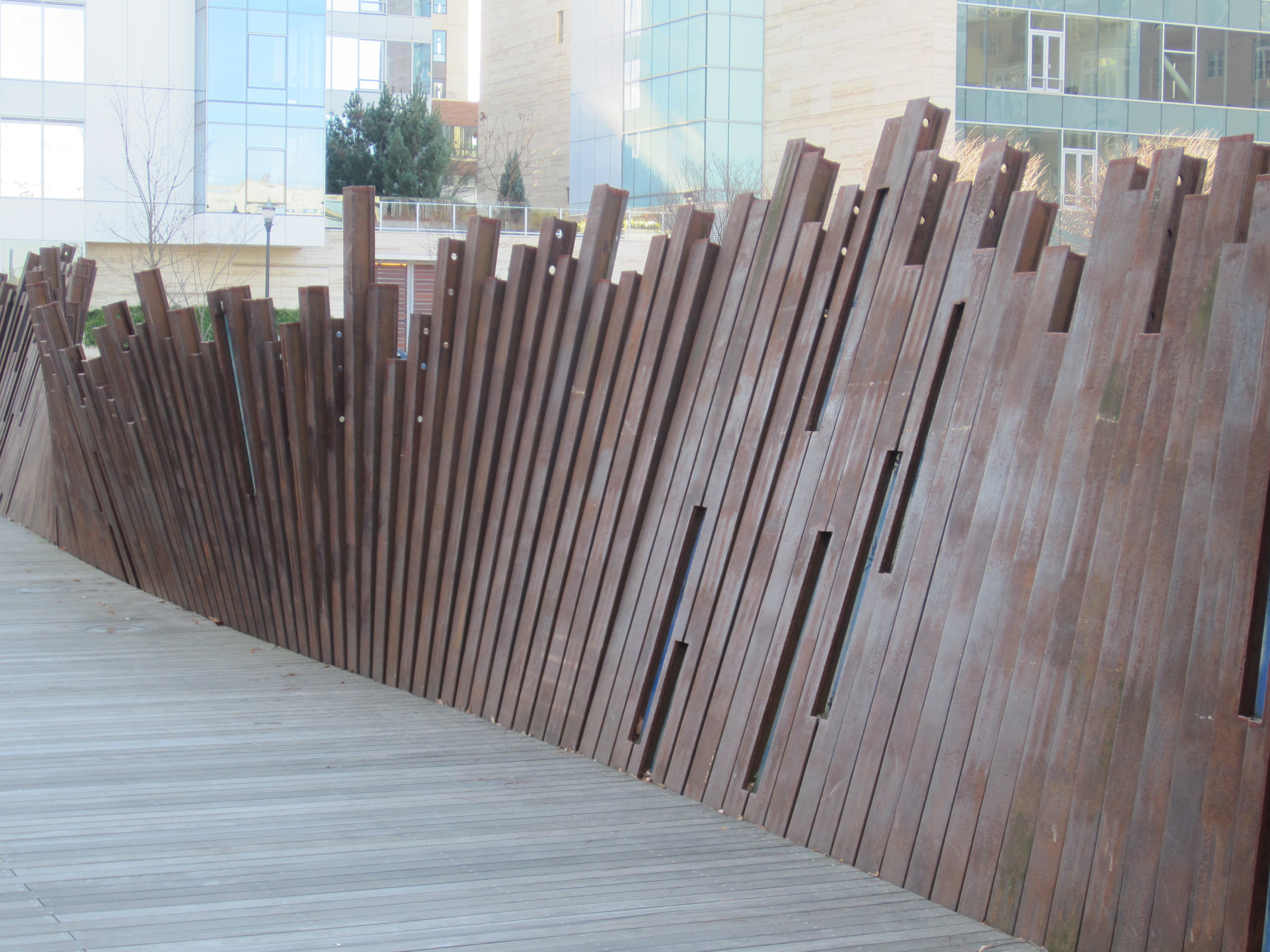
- The sculpture in 2012
- Artist: Herbert Dreiseitl
- Year: 2005
- Type: Sculpture
- Medium: Reclaimed train rails (weathered steel), glass
- Dimensions: 5.2 m × 61 m (17 ft × 200 ft)
- Location: Portland, Oregon, United States; 45°31′53″N 122°40′54″W
- Owner: City of Portland and Multnomah County Public Art Collection courtesy of the Regional Arts & Culture Council

Artwall, also known as Art Wall, is an outdoor 2005 sculpture by German architect and artist Herbert Dreiseitl, located at Tanner Springs Park in the Pearl District of Portland, Oregon.

== Description and history ==
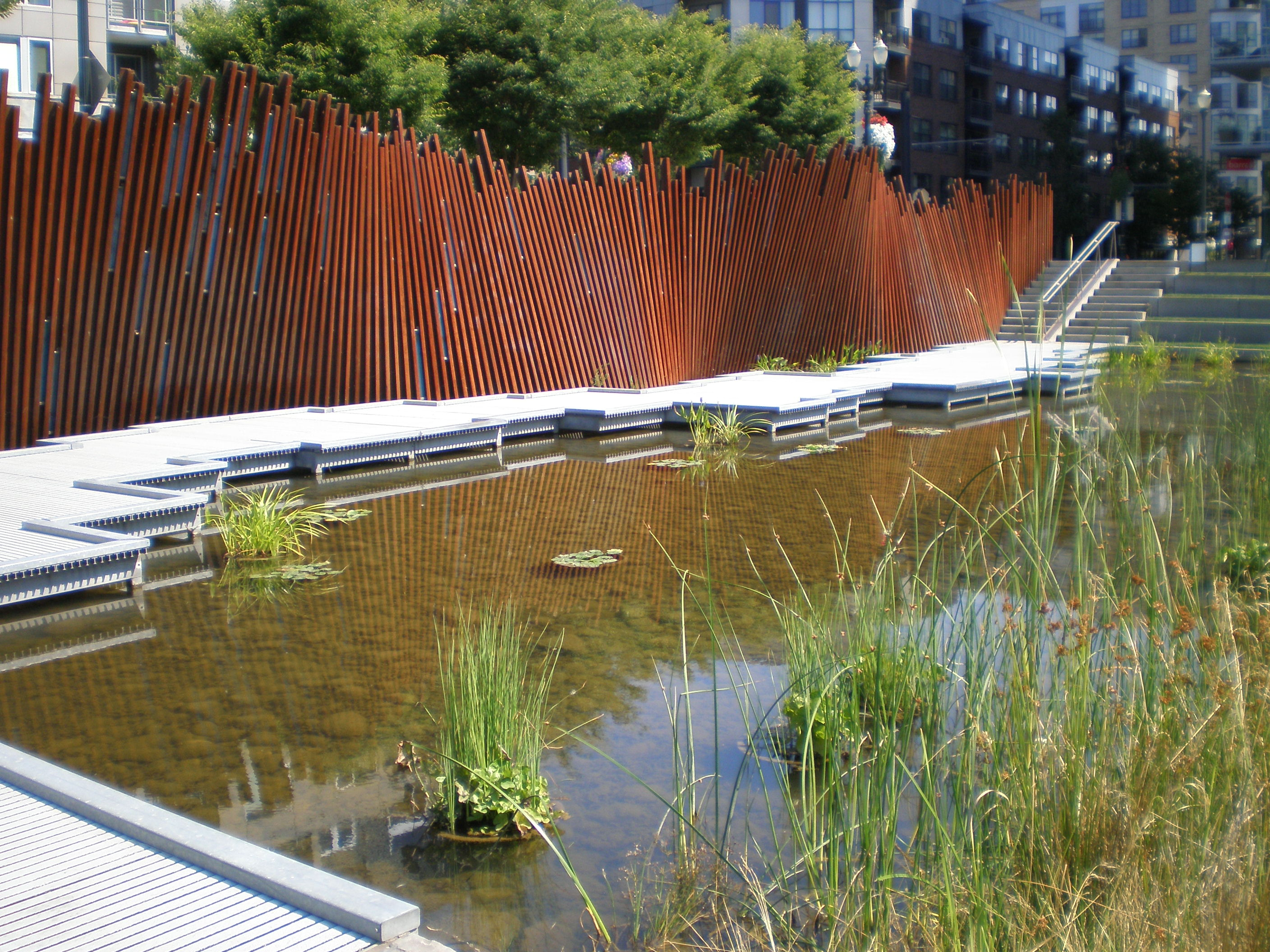
The sculpture in 2009

Artwall was designed by architect Herbert Dreiseitl along with Tanner Springs Park. The sculpture was installed at Northwest Marshall Street and Northwest 10th Avenue, along the east edge of the park, in 2005. It was funded by the City of Portland's Percent for Art program and construction funds from PDC. The art wall measures 17 feet (5.2 m) x 200 feet (61 m) and features 368 reclaimed railroad tracks (weathered steel) standing on end and 99 pieces of fused glass inset with images of native wildlife such as amphibians, dragonflies, other insects, and spiders. Dreiseitl hand-painted the images directly onto Portland glass, before the pieces were fused and melted. The century-old tracks separate the park's boardwalk from the meadow and wetland portion, and have been described as "reminders of the area's industrial past".

The Smithsonian Institution categorizes the sculpture as both abstract and architectural. According to the Regional Arts & Culture Council, which administers the work, "The concept of the Artwall integrates the concept of the park itself. In one urban block the skin of city is peeled back to reveal the landscape before its industrial development. The wall is an element which thrives on the polarity between the site's industrial past and the purity of its new nature." Artwall is part of the City of Portland and Multnomah County Public Art Collection courtesy of the Regional Arts & Culture Council.

== See also ==
- 2005 in art
- History of rail in Oregon
- Rail transportation in Oregon
