= Tanner Springs Park =

Public park in Portland, Oregon, U.S.

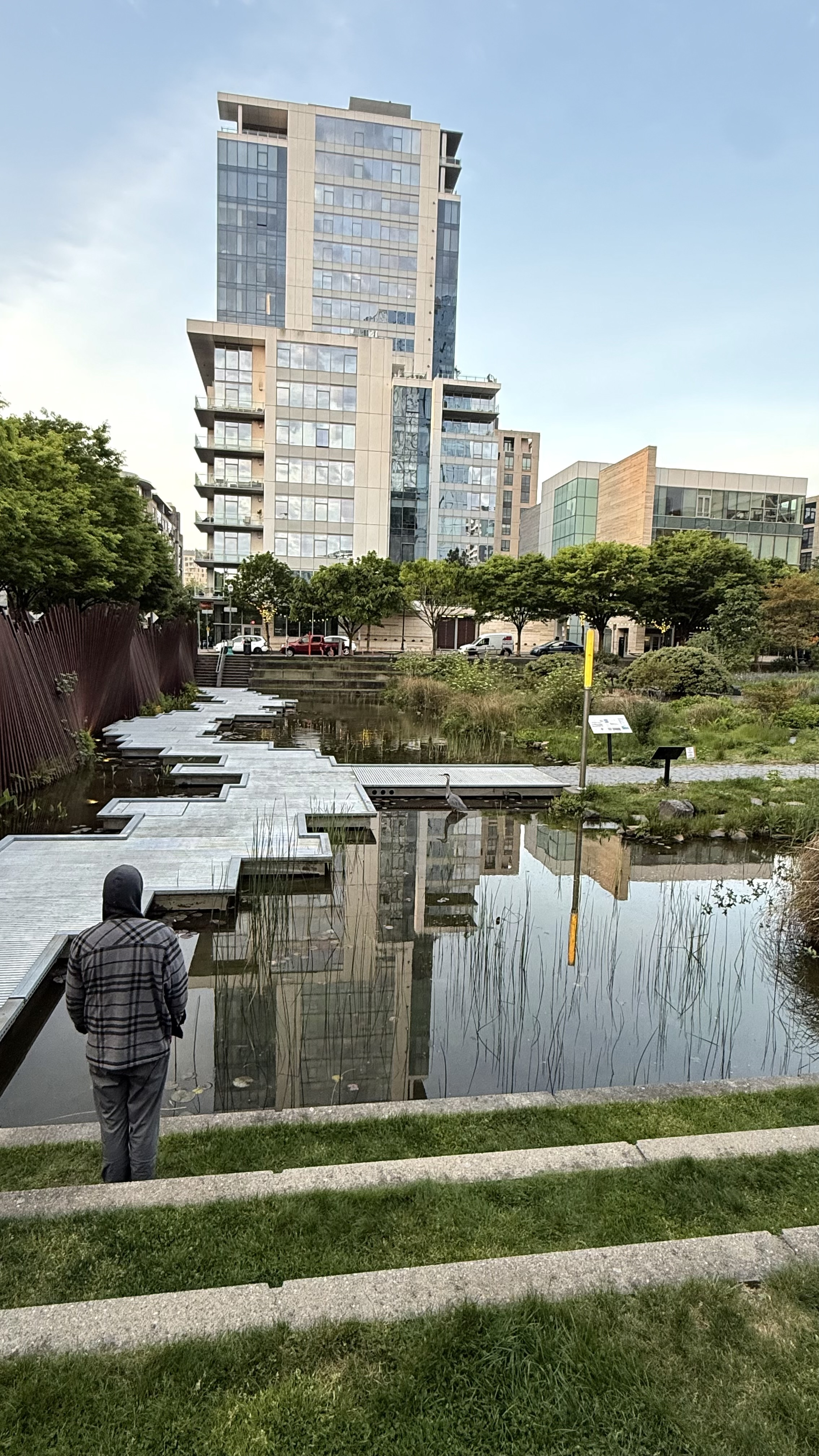
- Tanner Springs Park in 2026
- Interactive map of Tanner Springs Park
- Type: Urban park
- Location: NW 10th Ave. and Marshall St. Portland, Oregon
- Coordinates: 45.531203°N 122.681894°W
- Area: 0.92 acres (0.37 ha)
- Created: 2005
- Operator: Portland Parks & Recreation
- Status: Open 5 a.m. to midnight daily
- Public transit: NSAB

Tanner Springs Park is a pocket park in Portland, Oregon's Pearl District. It is the second of a series of three parks in the area including The Fields Park and Jamison Square that were laid out in the 2001 plan for River District Renewal. A fourth park was also planned but has not been built.

== History ==
Prior to becoming an urban environment this area was part of 1.7 million acres of prairie and wetlands including Tanner Creek, a body of water named for a nearby tannery owned by Daniel H. Lownsdale which flowed into a superficial lake that the city filled in the 1880s. A 1999 Pearl District plan named the park North Park Square, but in 2005 it was renamed after the creek, which had been rerouted to flow in pipes below ground. An early goal of the park was to transfer Tanner Creek to the surface again, but this objective was never completed.

Originally, the park was to be designed by Maya Lin, but concerns about her large sculpture, called "Playground", worried Pearl District residents who did not want another child-centered park only two blocks from Jamison Square.

== Design ==
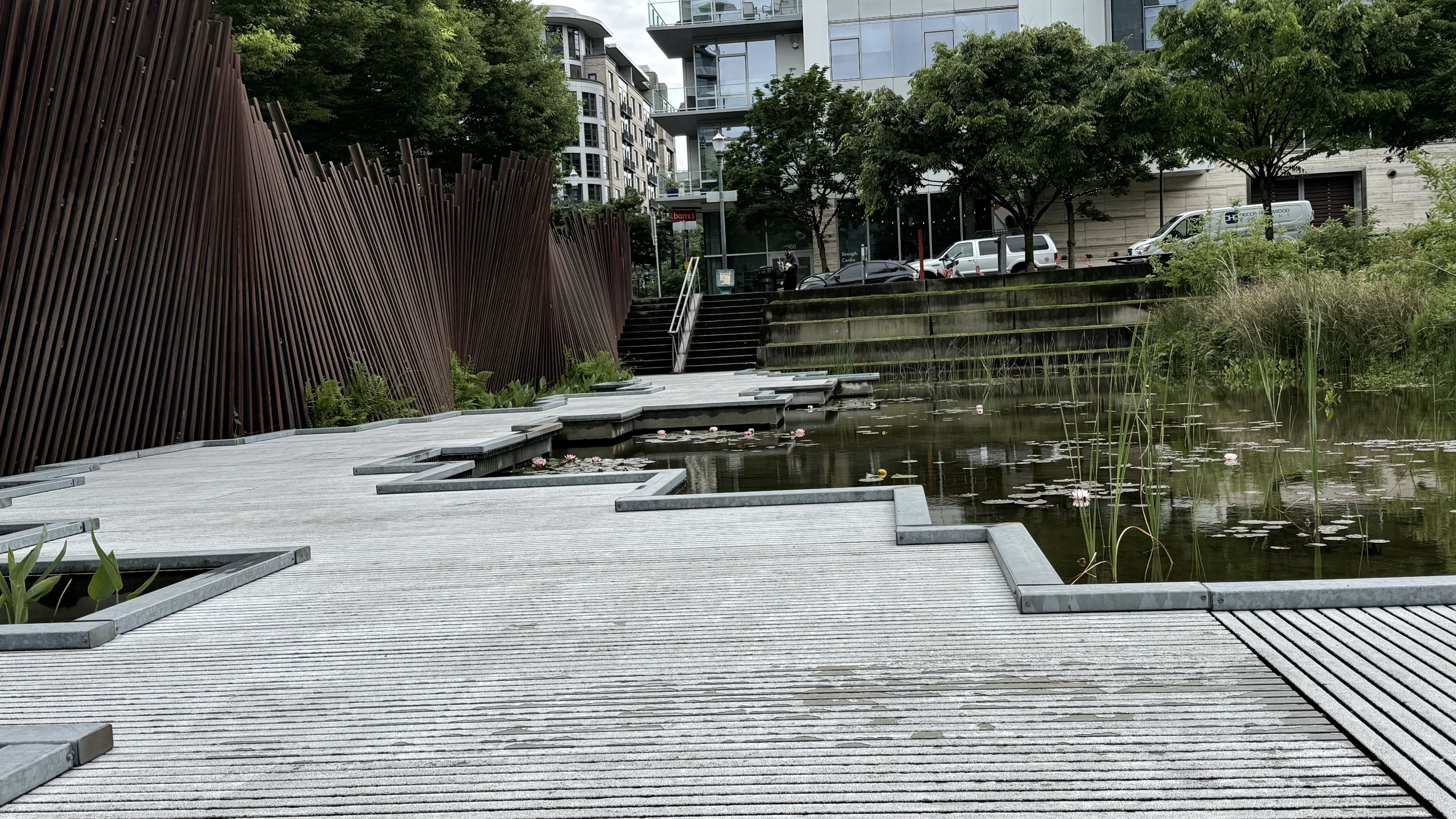
Tanner Springs May 2026

Connected to the busy Jamison Square two blocks South and to The Fields Park two blocks North by a wooden boardwalk made of ipê, Tanner Springs Park is a quiet and naturalistic urban green space, designed by Atelier Dreiseitl and GreenWorks PC.

Stripping away the industrial cover helped reconnect the neighborhood with the pre-industrial wetlands, especially Tanner Creek, which ran through the area. The New York Times described it as "a sort of cross between an Italian piazza and a weedy urban wetland with lots of benches perched beside gently running streams."

The waterscape was designed by architect Herbert Dreiseitl, who spent time hearing from community members and perfecting the sound made by the rushing water. During storms, the leaf-shaped Rainwater Pavilion catches runoff and channels it into the water system where it is filtered using UV light.

The park is planted with tall native grasses, and includes Oregon oak, red alder and bigleaf maple trees, salvaged in the region and planted as mature trees. Wildlife species not often viewed in urban landscapes such as osprey and great blue heron have been seen and celebrated by locals, though the most common species documented in the park on iNaturalist were the pacific forktail, vivid dancer, mallard, flame skimmer, and song sparrow as of February, 2025.

The east wall of the park includes an art installation called Artwall, primarily composed of rail tracks recovered from the area placed vertically along the east wall. Portland Terminal Railroad donated the rails, recovered from the region. Some rails date back to 1898. Bullseye Glass, a local glass art company, supplied 99 translucent blue pieces of glass, which are interspersed in the rails. They were painted by Herbert Dreiseitl with scenes of indigenous animals.

== Reception ==
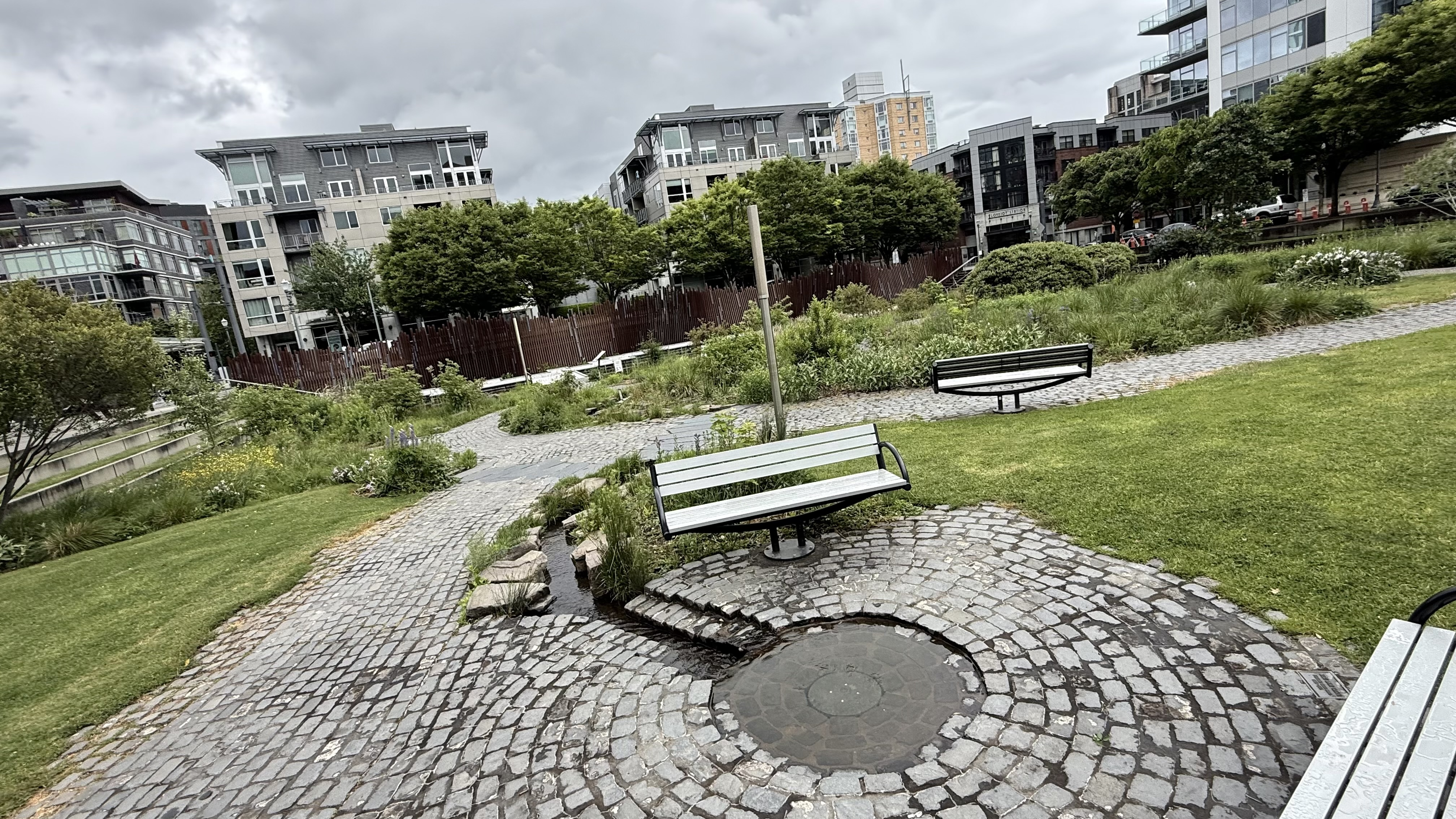
Tanner Springs Park May 2026

After early damage to the pond's ecosystem, signs were placed to explicitly indicate pets are not allowed.

Some visitors consider the park a waste of money, while others appreciate the serenity that a pocket park can provide in the middle of the city. Still others participate in yoga or meditation in the park. The park has been called a "beautiful little oasis", and architect Laurie Olin remarked:

I've heard some Portlanders are snippy about Dreiseitl's park, boutique ecology and all that. I like the concept, but I'm not crazy about the proportions, for instance, of the stair-step grass seats. I like the idea of recycling the railroad rails and the sense of memory, but they look nasty and scary and that you're going to hurt yourself. The walkways are too Uncle Wiggly to me, too cutesy. But that's one designer criticizing the other designer's cuffs and pockets. I'm not arguing with the raison d'etre.

In 2012 Tanner Springs Park was a finalist for the Urban Land Institute's National Urban Open Space Award, and was cited as offering "a model of sustainable urban design articulated through its water management systems and rich features" and "an engaging respite embedded in the dynamic of a high density urban neighborhood." In 2019 the Xerces Society referenced the park as an example of how room for pollinator habitat can be made even in dense urban environments.
