= Ramboll Studio Dreiseitl =

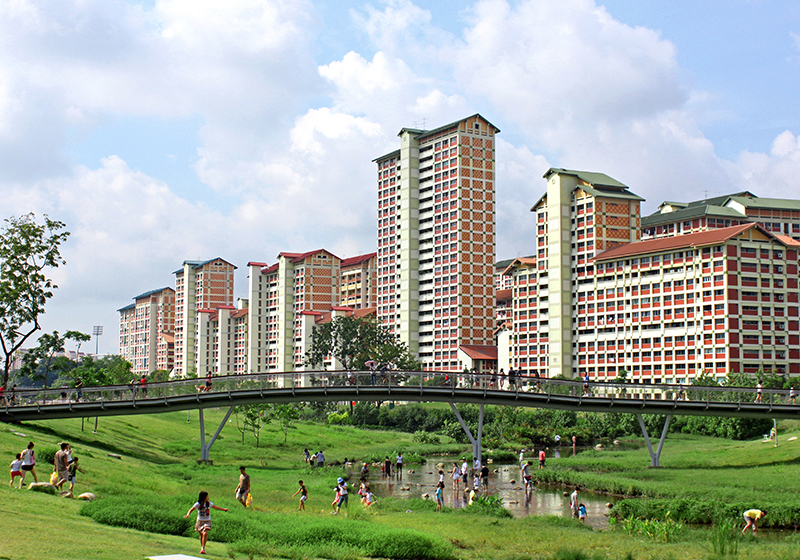
People have a new and direct connection to nature in Bishan-Ang Mo Kio Park.

Ramboll Studio Dreiseitl Was one of the leading landscape architecture practices of Germany specialising in the integration of art, urban hydrology, environmental engineering, and landscape architecture within an urban context. The practise was founded in 1980 by the German landscape architect Herbert Dreiseitl with a goal to promote sustainable projects with a high aesthetic and social value. Today it has offices in Germany, Singapore and Beijing. In May 2013, Atelier Dreiseitl was renamed Ramboll Studio Dreiseitl GmbH and became a partner within the international engineering consultancy, the Ramboll Group A/S, based in Copenhagen.

On April 3, 2023, Ramboll Studio Dreiseitl joined the international architecture, landscape architecture and urbanism studio Henning Larsen Architects, and is now part of the Henning Larsen team,

== Profile ==
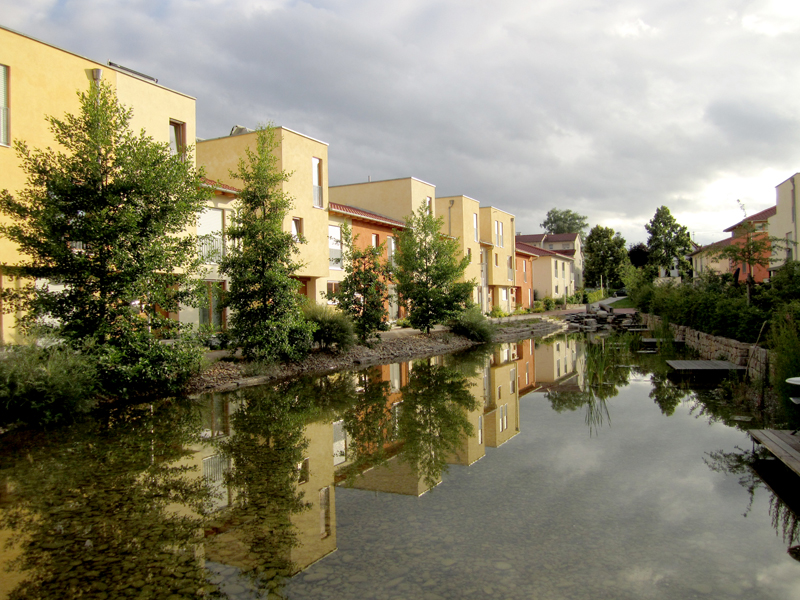
The eco-friendly development of Arkadien Winnenden.

The multidisciplinary practice seeks to raise awareness of the social and ecological value of water in urban design. The scope of the practice's work includes strategic catchment-based urban masterplans, urban parks, rivers, civic space and water playgrounds. Over the past 40 years, it has accumulated experience in technical water systems, including water storage, treatment and reuse, retention and infiltration techniques, grey and black water systems, climatisation and green roofs.

The consultancy was described in 2012 in Der Spiegel as “a kind of hidden champion of the German design scene”.

== Projects ==
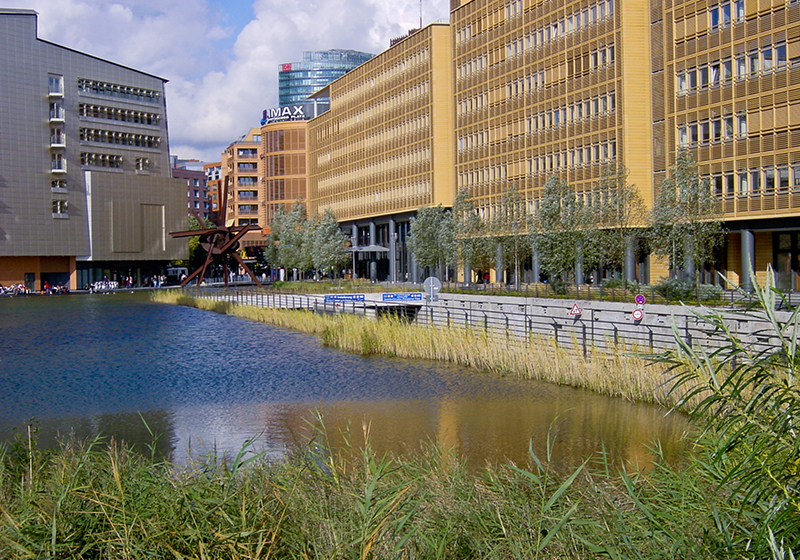
Potsdamer Platz: Ramboll Studio Dreiseitl developed the scheme for rainwater harvest, circulation and display.

Ramboll Studio Dreiseitl are responsible for the waterscape on Potsdamer Platz in Berlin. Water was central to Renzo Piano and Christoph Kohlbecker's original design, but it was Ramboll Studio Dreiseitl that conceived and developed the scheme for rainwater recycling and created the many opportunities for public engagement with water. The scheme is one of the largest urban rainwater harvesting projects in the world and in 2011, it became one of the first city quarters to be retrospectively awarded the DGNB Certificate of the German Sustainable Building Council (DGNB) in silver.

Another major project in Germany is Arkadien Winnenden, the ecological city design which was named winner of the Green Dot Award ‘Build’ category in 2011. The firm turned the abandoned factory site into an eco-friendly development which combines dense layout with green space, includes permeable paving and waterways which provide natural flood control and a lake which filters rainwater.

In 2018, Ramboll Studio Dreiseitl was awarded the German Design Award in the category "Urban Space an Infrastructure" for their design and planning of the project Hafen Offenbach in Offenbach am Main, Germany. Studio Dreiseitl has transformed the initial urban plan by reconnecting public open spaces with their scenic context, creating a liveable as well as ecologically enriching neighbourhood.

In Asia, projects include the blue green infrastructure in the Tianjin Cultural Park near Beijing and the water strategy for the central catchment for the city of Singapore, together with the engineers CH2M Hill, as well as the design of the 60ha Bishan-Ang Mo Kio Park. The rehabilitation of the previously concreted Kallang River (which became a dangerous torrent in the rainy season) employed techniques of water collection and flood control which were entirely new to Singapore. Ramboll Studio Dreiseitl built a test area and held workshops to explain the concepts. The designers gave the river gentle banks and recycled the concrete from the old drainage channel to create stairs. Now Bishan Park is one of the most popular parks in Singapore, where people can have a new and direct connection to nature. In 2012, the design was awarded the Presidents Design Award Singapore and the World Architecture Festival “Landscape of the Year”.

== Project listing ==
- Bishan-Ang Mo Kio Park – Singapore
- Potsdamer Platz – Berlin, Germany
- Arkadien Winnenden – Germany
- Tianjin Cultural Park – China
- Holalokka – Oslo, Norway
- McLaren Technology Centre – London, UK
- Pforzheim Water Playground – Germany
- Tanner Springs Park – Portland, USA
- Lanferbach – Gelsenkirchen, Germany
- Maybach Centre of Excellence – Sindelfingen, Germany
- River Volme Renaturation – Hagen, Germany
- City Hall Green Roof – Chicago, USA
- Heiner-Metzger-Platz – Neu-Ulm, Germany
- Residential and commercial complex Prisma – Nuremberg, Germany
- Hafen Offenbach – Offenbach am Main, Germany

== Selected awards ==
- 2012 German Urban Planning Award – BUGA Koblenz, Germany
- 2012 President's Design Award – Bishan-Ang Mo Kio Park, Singapore
- 2012 WAF Landscape of the Year – Kallang River Bishan-Ang Mo Kio Park, Singapore
- 2011 Green Dot Award Ecological City – Arkadien Winnenden, Germany
- 2011 LivCom Environmental Best Practice Eco Quartier – Pfaffenhofen, Germany
- 2011 LivCom Award for Liveable Communities – Pfaffenhofen, Germany
- 2011 BCA Greenmark “Platinum” Award for New Parks – JTC CleanTech Park, Singapore
- 2011 DGNB Silver Sustainable City District – Berlin Potsdamer Platz, Germany
- 2002 ASLA Merit Award – Chicago City Hall Green Roof, USA
- 2001 Earth Society Foundation “Environmental Award” – Solar City Linz, Austria
- 1989 United Nations “Best Practice Award” – Solar City Linz, Austria

== See also ==
- Sustainable city
- Green Infrastructure
- Water-sensitive urban design
- Sustainable urban drainage system
- Low-impact development (Canada/US)
