= Bishan otter family =

Family of otters in Marina Bay, Singapore

- Other name: Bishan 5, Bishan 10
- Species: Lutrogale perspicillata
- Residence: Bishan-Ang Mo Kio Park; Marina Bay

The Bishan otter family, also known as the Bishan 10 and previously known as the Bishan 5, is a family of smooth-coated otters that reside in Marina Bay, Singapore. The otters have become a popular attraction since they were first spotted in 2014.

== Background ==
The Bishan otter family were first sighted at Bishan-Ang Mo Kio Park in 2014. Originally dubbed the "Bishan 5", the otter family gained national attention in 2015 when the National Parks Board uploaded pictures and videos of them on their Facebook page. That same year, the Bishan otter family relocated to Marina Bay after chasing out another otter family that had been living there. They became known as the "Bishan 10" after the birth of five new pups in 2016.

The smooth-coated otter is currently classified as a critically endangered species in Singapore, and until 1998 there had been no reported sightings since the 1970s. The emergence of the Bishan otter family, along with several other otter families, was noted by The Economist as a reflection of the success of Singapore's greening policy, which included a notable increase in water quality.

The original male patriarch died on 5 May 2018, at seven or eight years old. Following this, the matriarch took on a new mate. The matriarch died on 16 December 2022, aged around 11 or 12. She is recorded as having had 43 pups over her lifetime.

== Celebrity status ==
The otter family was featured in the David Attenborough documentary Wild City, and their exploits are frequently covered by the Singapore media. In 2016, the otter family was voted by The Straits Times readers to represent Singapore on her 51st birthday, beating Singlish, the thumbdrive (which was allegedly invented by a Singaporean company), the Singapore passport and the Caméra d'Or-winning Singaporean film Ilo Ilo. They also had received other international press coverage from the French magazine Terre Sauvage.

On 7 August 2023, the otter family was featured as a doodle on the Google search engine's home page. The doodle depicted five otters huddled up against a backdrop of Marina Bay Sands.

== Incidents ==
=== Marina otter family ===
The Bishan otter family had been involved in several fights with another otter family, dubbed the Marina otter family by the local media. In 2015, the Bishan otters relocated to Marina Bay after chasing out the Marina otter family. Another clash between the two otter families resulted in the death of a Marina otter pup. On 11 June 2017, members of the public intervened to protect the Marina otters from their Bishan rivals by scaring the latter off with loud noises. The incident sparked an internet debate concerning human intervention in fights between the two otter families.

=== Illegal fishing ===
There have been reports of wild otters, including the Bishan otters, being injured by illegal fishing activities in Singapore. In January 2017, a female otter believed to be one of the Bishan otters was found with a fishing line and hook embedded in its body. In April 2017, another otter, also thought to be one of the Bishan otters, was injured when a fishing hook became entangled in one of its front paws.

On 14 June 2017, a suspected member of the Bishan otter family was found dead in an illegal fishing trap along the Marina Promenade. The Public Utilities Board stated that they would take enforcement action against the man caught setting up the traps.

== Other otter families ==
One of the daughters of the Bishan otter family was reported to have started a separate family along the Singapore river, in close proximity to the a building along Jiak Kim Street that formerly housed the nightclub Zouk. The family, which was dubbed the Zouk otter family by local media, was the largest known otter family in Singapore in June 2024, comprising about 17 otter individuals.

On 28 June 2024, Ottercity, an otter interest group, reported that the dead body of the matriarch of the Zouk otter family (dubbed 'Zouk mum') had been discovered in a canal in Potong Pasir. The remainder of the Zouk otter family were downstream from the carcass. At the time, the Zouk mum was estimated to be about 8 years old.
