= Herbert Dreiseitl =

German artist

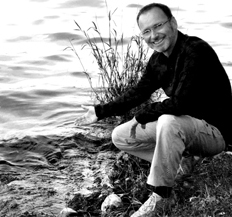
- Herbert Dreiseitl in 2010
- Born: 16 March 1955 (age 71); Ulm, Germany
- Occupation: Architect
- Awards: Urban Edge Award, University of Wisconsin-Milwaukee USA (2011) Loeb Fellowship, Harvard University (2011)
- Practice: Founder: Atelier Dreiseitl, now: Ramboll Studio Dreiseitl, Founder: Ramboll Liveable Cities Lab
- Website: www.dreiseitlconsulting.com

Herbert Dreiseitl (born 1955) is a sculptor, artist, landscape architect and interdisciplinary urban planner. He founded the firm Atelier Dreiseitl in 1980 with a vision to develop liveable cities inspired by a deep understanding of water. In 2013, the studio was acquired by the Danish-based international consultancy group and continued under the name Ramboll Studio Dreiseitl. As of 2023, Dreiseitl's office is located in Überlingen, Germany, still a local affiliate of Ramboll. He has taught courses at the National University of Singapore and at Harvard University.

== Philosophy ==
For Dreiseitl, landscape architecture is more than plants, sidewalks, planters, and ponds. His approach focuses on water and its natural flow, not only as an aesthetic element, but also as a way to incorporate effective water-management infrastructure and to emphasise water's role as a significant ecological and social tool. The humanistic aspect of his approach is recognised and respected by his peers because of its visible results.

Dreiseitl's philosophy has become particularly relevant at a time when climate change and water supply have been put high on the agenda of key institutions such as the IMF, World Bank, Asian Development Bank and world governments and are named as two of the top five global risks facing companies today.

Herbert Dreiseitl has been described as, "the international doyen of landscape design with water".

== Life and career ==
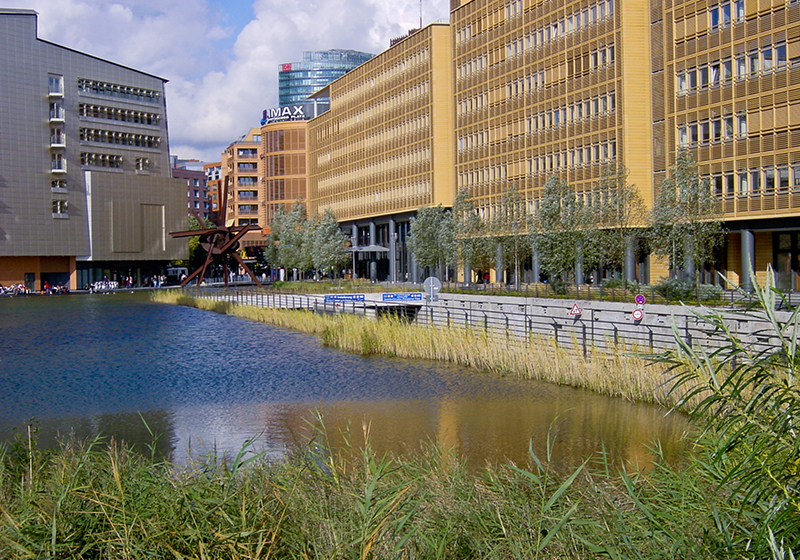
Potsdamer Platz: Atelier Dreiseitl developed the scheme for rainwater recycling in an urban oasis

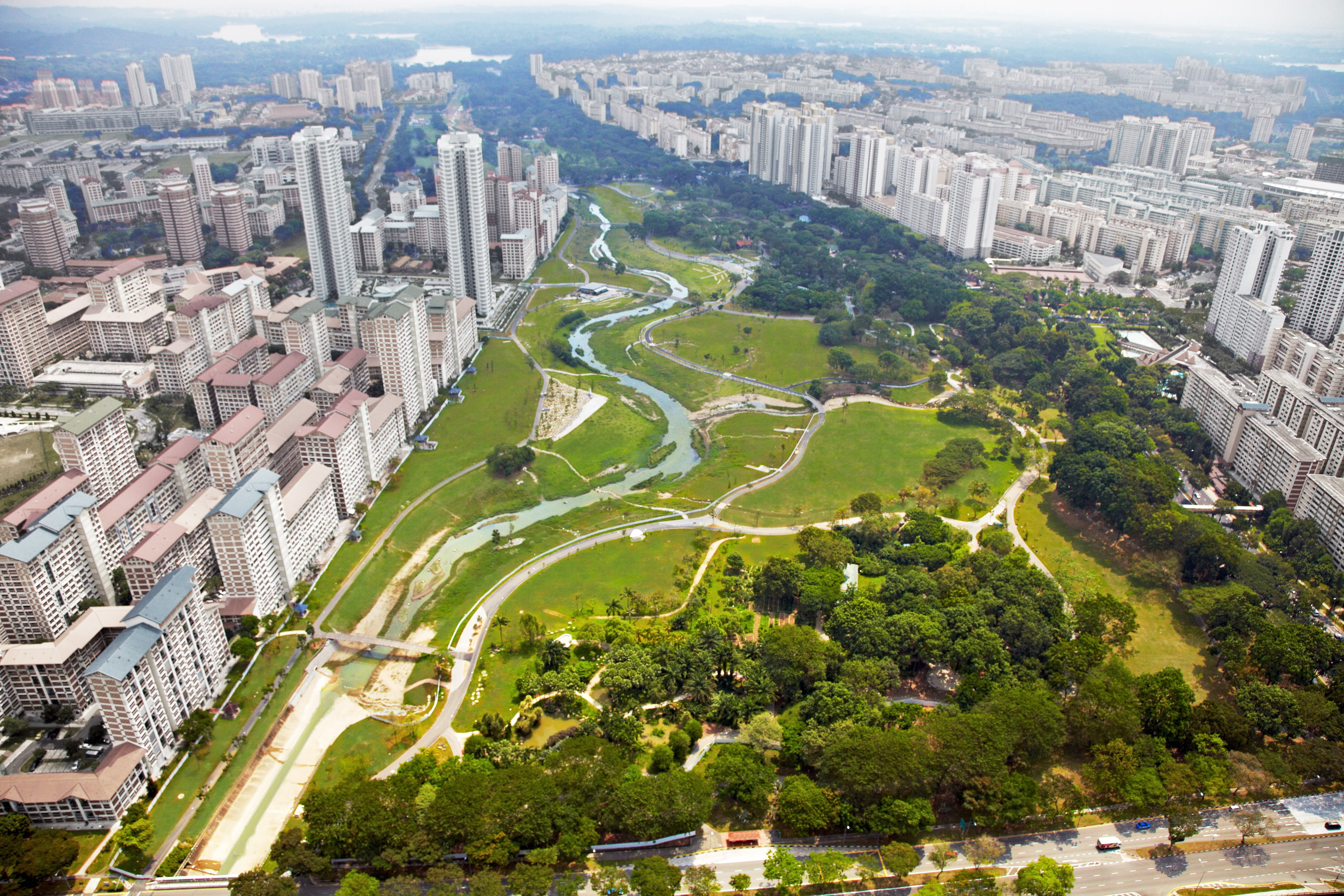
Aerial view of Bishan Ang Mo Kio Park project in Singapore

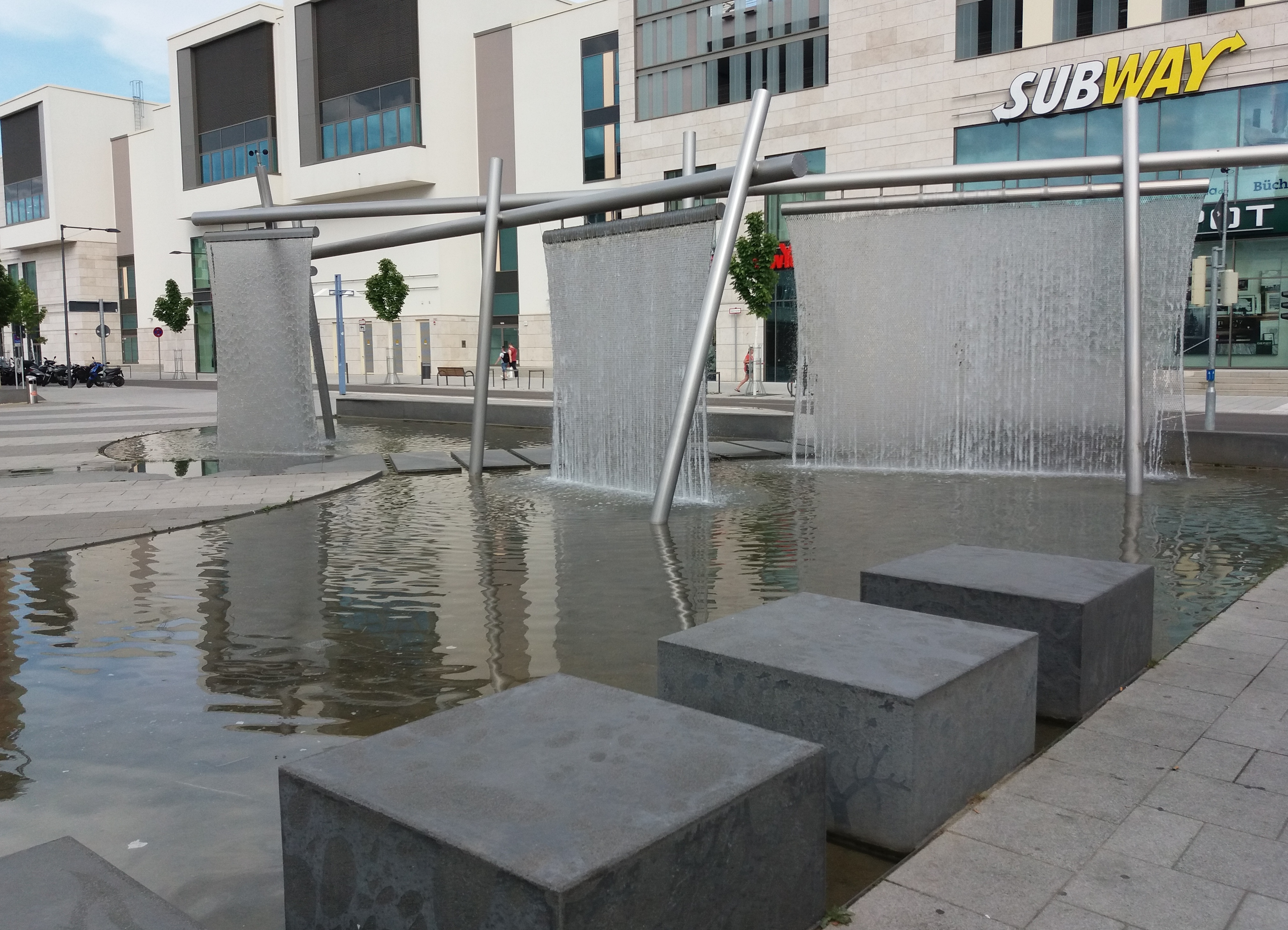
Water fountain designed by Dreiseitl in Neu-Ulm

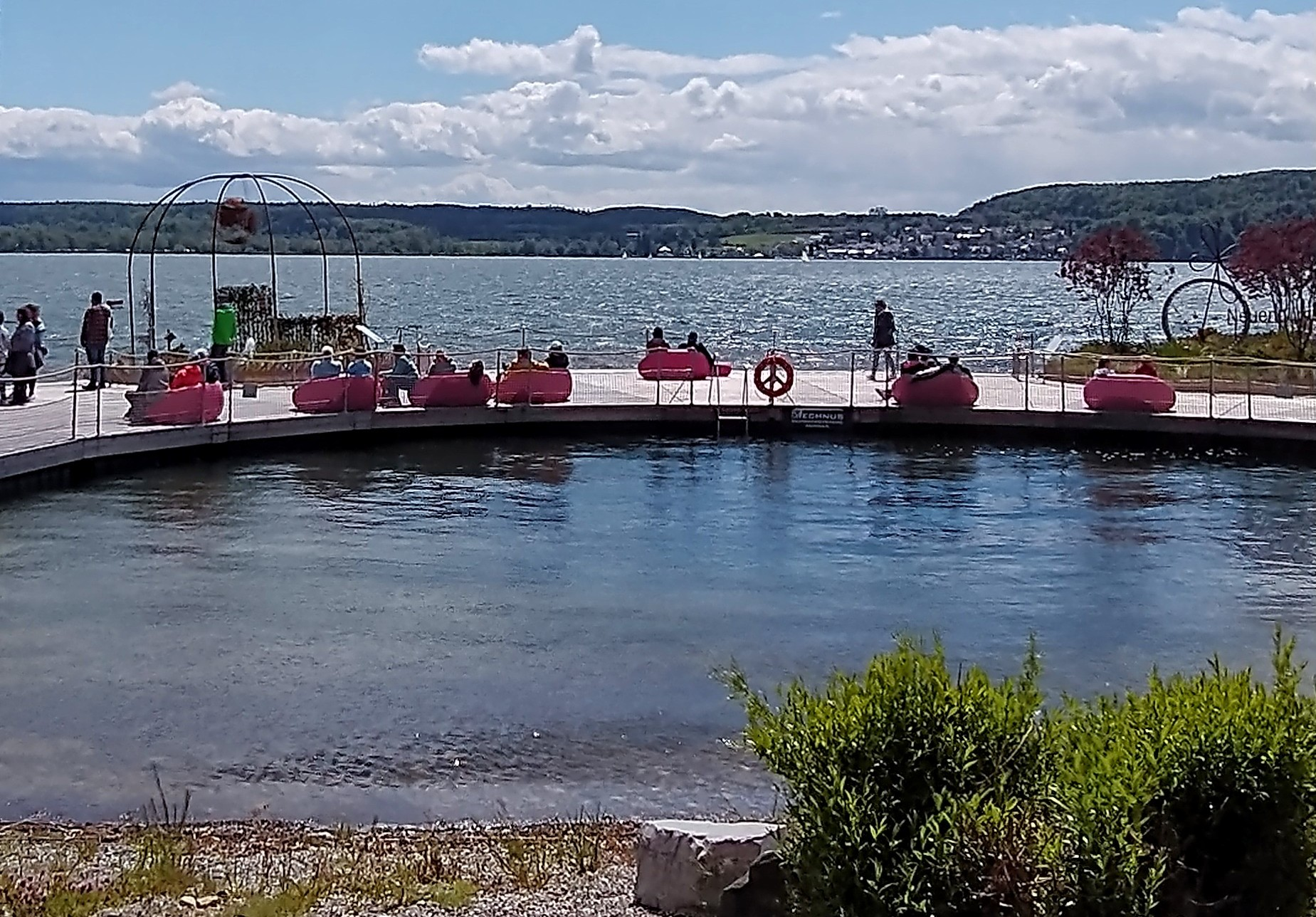
Swimming gardens, Überlingen 2021

Dreiseitl was born in Ulm, Germany, where he attended the Ulm Waldorf School. He trained as an artist and did apprenticeships in England, Norway and Germany. He was strongly influenced by the philosophies of Rudolf Steiner, Hugo Kükelhaus and Joseph Beuys.

During his period of alternative civilian service, Dreiseitl initiated an art therapy program for young drug addicts, which was so successful that he continued it for four years. Whilst there, he recognised that for young people, the urban environment is very important for liveability and public health and based on this decided to work toward improving the conditions in cities.

=== Projects ===
Dreiseitl's expertise is in combining artistic aspects with environmental planning and implementation, especially with regards to water in an urban setting. His work is considered to be at the cutting edge in urban hydrology and the treatment of waste and stormwater. This involves realizing sustainable infrastructure which combines urban needs with space for nature and people. To promote topics related to sustainable infrastructure, he founded the Liveable Cities Lab within the Ramboll Group.

His first major public work was an award-winning fountain for a new garden for the blind in Ulm, designed with the landscape architectal company Eppinger + Schmid. In preparation for his design, Dreiseitl met regularly with a group of interested blind people to better understand how they experience the world without sight.

After founding his studio Atelier Dreiseitl, Dreiseitl worked on his first stormwater management plan in 1981 in a new suburb in Lausanne, Switzerland.

In the following 40 years, his consultancy has completed many dozens of projects, ranging from modest water features to large-scale water management systems, including Renzo Piano's Potsdamer Platz in Berlin, Norman Foster's McLaren Technology Centre in London and the SolarCity Linz, Austria.

In 2021, the town where his offices are located hosted the biennial Regional Garden Show in the state of Baden-Württemberg. Although his consultancy did not win the bid to design the entire grounds, Dreiseitl designed and implemented a popular attraction for the 6-month long garden show which involved a temporary floating platform extending from the shore out onto Lake Constance.

=== Teaching and public advocacy ===
In 2011, Dreiseitl was appointed to a Loeb Fellowship at the Harvard Graduate School of Design in Cambridge, Massachusetts. As a Loeb Fellow, he explored the history of water and society, the changing exogenous water security environments, and design tools for managing global water-related risks.

Dreiseitl is a visiting professor at the National University of Singapore, where he focusses on both teaching and research.

Through his consultancy Dreiseitl runs workshops and pilot projects and gives speeches to encourage cities to implement better solutions to current urban challenges.

=== Local politics ===
Dreiseitl is a member of his town's branch of the political party Alliance 90/The Greens. In May 2019 he was elected to the municipal council of Überlingen, where he is a member of various subcommittees in his areas of expertise.

== Personal life ==
Dreiseitl is married to Bettina Dreiseitl-Wanschura. She has a master's degree in landscape ecology. She works at Dreiseitlconsulting and is a founding partner in a planning consultancy in Vienna, Austria. She is also a local member of the Green party and a member of Überlingen's municipal council.

== Selected awards ==
- 2017 Fellow of ASLA, The American Society of Landscape Architects, Los Angeles
- 2016 Award of Excellence, ASLA, for Copenhagen Cloudburst Mitigation Plan
- 2016 Honor Award, The American Society of Landscape Architects (ASLA) for Bishan-Ang Mo Kio Park in Singapore
- 2015 President's Design Award Singapore, Jury Member, Singapore
- 2015 Reallabor Stadt, Research funding Jury Chair, Mannheim
- 2014 President's Design Award Jurong Eco-Garden, Singapore
- 2012 President's Design Award Bishan-Ang Mo Kio Park, Singapore
- 2012 WAF Landscape of the Year Kallang River Bishan- Ang Mo Kio Park, Singapore
- 2011 Urban Edge Award from University of Wisconsin-Milwaukee, USA
- 2011 Loeb Fellowship at the Graduate School of Design at Harvard University, USA

== Publications ==
- Dreiseitl, H., (2022). "Building Community Resilience for Climate Change." In: Better Cities, Issue 133 (January 2022) online
- Dreiseitl, H., (2018). In: Sustainable Nation – Urban Design Patterns for the Future, Douglas Farr, Wiley
- Dreiseitl, H. (2016). In: Sustainable Urbanism: Integrating Behavior, Neighborhoods, and Technology through Urban Design.
- Dreiseitl, H., (2016). In: Out of Water – With a foreword by Herbert Dreiseitl
- Dreiseitl, H., (2016). Dense + Green, Innovative Building Types for Sustainable Urban Architecture, Birkhäuser
- Dreiseitl, H., (2015). Liveable Cities; The Art of Integrating Today What We Need Tomorrow, Future Arch 2015
- Dreiseitl, H., (2018). Enhancing blue-green infrastructure and social performance in high-density urban environments. National University of Singapore, Harvard Graduate School of Design, MIT and Zeppelin University; funded by the Ramboll Foundation, 2013–2016
- Dreiseitl, H., Wanschura, B., Tovatt, D. O. (2015). Shaping Landscapes and Human Welfare. Comparative Field Study of the Non-Material Effects of Blue-Green Integration in Singapore. NUS, Singapore
- Dreiseitl, H., Leonardsen, J.A., Wanschura, B. (2015). Cost-Benefit Analysis of Bishan-Ang Mo Kio Park. National University of Singapore
- Dreiseitl, H., (2015). Blue-Green Infrastructure for Cities, EcoBuild Magazine TR 2015
- Dreiseitl, H., & Grau, D. (2014). Waterscapes Innovation. Design Media, UK. (ISBN 988-12-9693-5)
- Dreiseitl, H., Grau, D., & Ludwig, Karl H C. (2001) Waterscapes: Planning, Building and Designing with Water. Birkhäuser, Switzerland. (ISBN 3-7643-6508-0)
- Dreiseitl, H. Grau, D. (2005) New Waterscapes: Planning, Building and Designing with Water. Birkhäuser, Switzerland. (ISBN 3-7643-7476-4)
- Dreiseitl, H. Grau, D. (2009) Recent Waterscapes: Planning, Building and Designing with Water. Birkhäuser, Switzerland. (ISBN 978-3-7643-8984-0)
- Dreiseitl, H. Geiger, W F. Stemplewski, J (2010). Neue Wege für das Regenwasser. Oldenbourg Industrieverla. (ISBN 3-8356-3178-0)

== Memberships ==
- Member and Fellow of the American Society of Landscape Architecture, FASLA Nr. 778625
- Member Architektenkammer NW (L 41 560) – German Architects Association
- Member ASLA – American Society of Landscape Architects
- Member VBKW – Württemberg Association of Visual Artists
- Member BBK – Professional Association of Visual Artists
- Member ATV-DVWK – German Association for Water Management, Wastewater and Waste
- Member SILA – Singapore Institute of Landscape Architects

== See also ==
- Tanner Springs Park
- Bishan Park
- Sustainable city
- Green Infrastructure
- Water-sensitive urban design
- Sustainable urban drainage system
- Low-impact development (Canada/US)
- Resilient cities
- Urban resilience
