= Jiak Kim Bridge =

Pedestrian bridge in Singapore

Jiak Kim Bridge 若锦桥
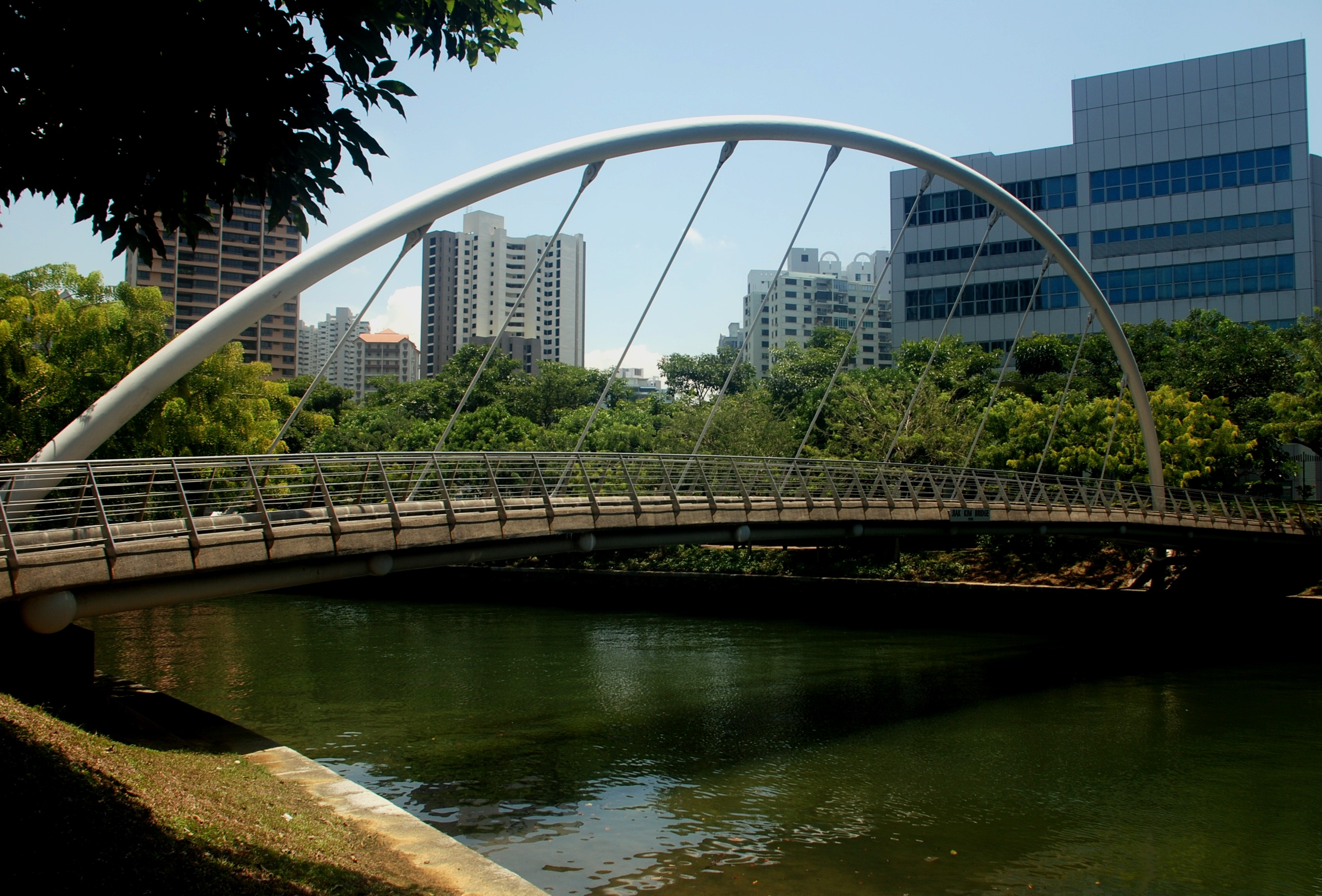
- Jiak Kim Bridge in March 2007
- Coordinates: 1°17′32″N 103°50′09″E
- Carries: Pedestrians
- Crosses: Singapore River
- Official name: Jiak Kim Bridge

Characteristics
- Design: cable arch bridge

History
- Designer: CPG Corporation
- Opened: 1999

The Jiak Kim Bridge (Chinese: 若锦桥; pinyin: Ruò jǐn qiáo) is a pedestrian bridge in Singapore. The bridge spans the Singapore River near Robertson Quay. Constructed in 1999, it was named after Tan Jiak Kim (Chinese: 陈若锦; pinyin: Chén Ruò Jǐn), grandson of famous merchant and philanthropist Tan Kim Seng and son of Tan Beng Swee (Chinese: 陈明水; pinyin: Chén Míng Shuǐ). He is also a prominent Straits-born Chinese merchant and political activist during the early 19th century.
