= Bishan–Ang Mo Kio Park =

Park in Bishan and Ang Mo Kio, Singapore

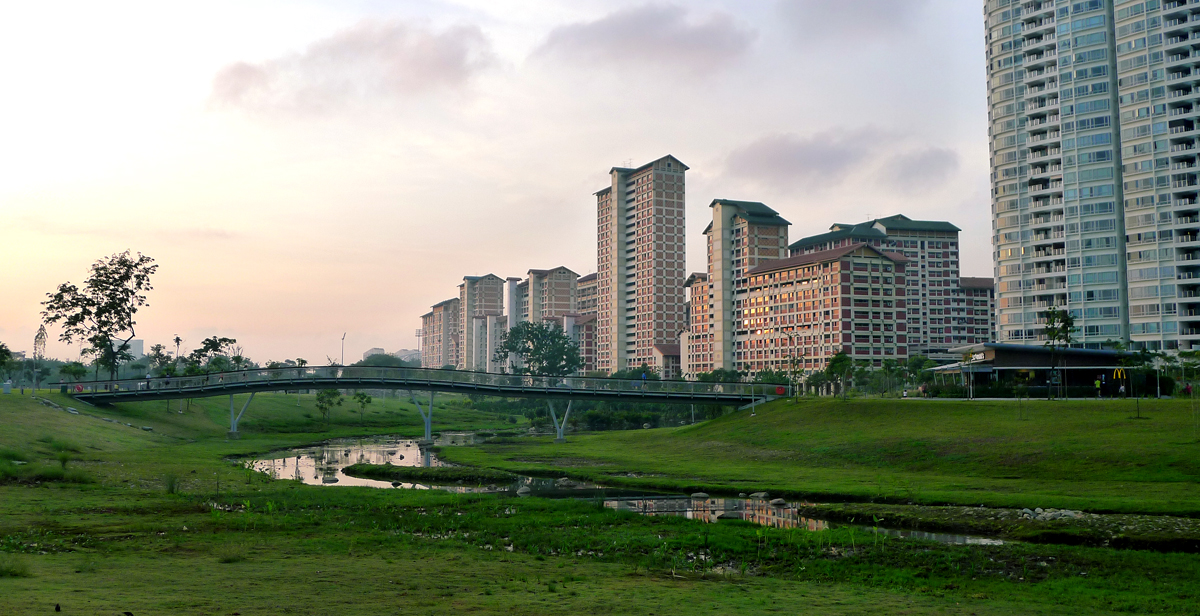
- Bishan-Ang Mo Kio Park at sunset, with the Kallang River in the foreground.
- Interactive map of Bishan–Ang Mo Kio Park
- Type: Neighbourhood Park
- Location: Bishan; Ang Mo Kio
- Coordinates: 1°22′N 103°50′E
- Created: 1988
- Operator: National Parks Board
- Status: Opened

Bishan–Ang Mo Kio Park is a major park in Singapore, located in the popular heartland of Bishan and Ang Mo Kio. Serving the residents of Bishan and Ang Mo Kio areas, the park sits entirely within Bishan Road and Ang Mo Kio Avenue 1, running along the Bishan-Ang Mo Kio boundary line, which is situated at Bishan Road and Ang Mo Kio Avenue 1. In the middle of the park lies the Kallang River, which runs through it in the form of a flat riverbed.

== History ==
The park was constructed to provide a buffer between Bishan Road and Ang Mo Kio Avenue 1. It was also envisioned as a leisure destination for residents ranging from children to nature-lovers, containing facilities such as a football field, a floating amphitheatre and a natural pond. Construction took place in two stages. The park, which cost $8.5 million to build, was one of the biggest park projects by the Housing and Development Board at the time of its construction. Before construction work was completed, people from the adjacent areas began using the unfinished facilities, making work on the park difficult.

== Redevelopment ==
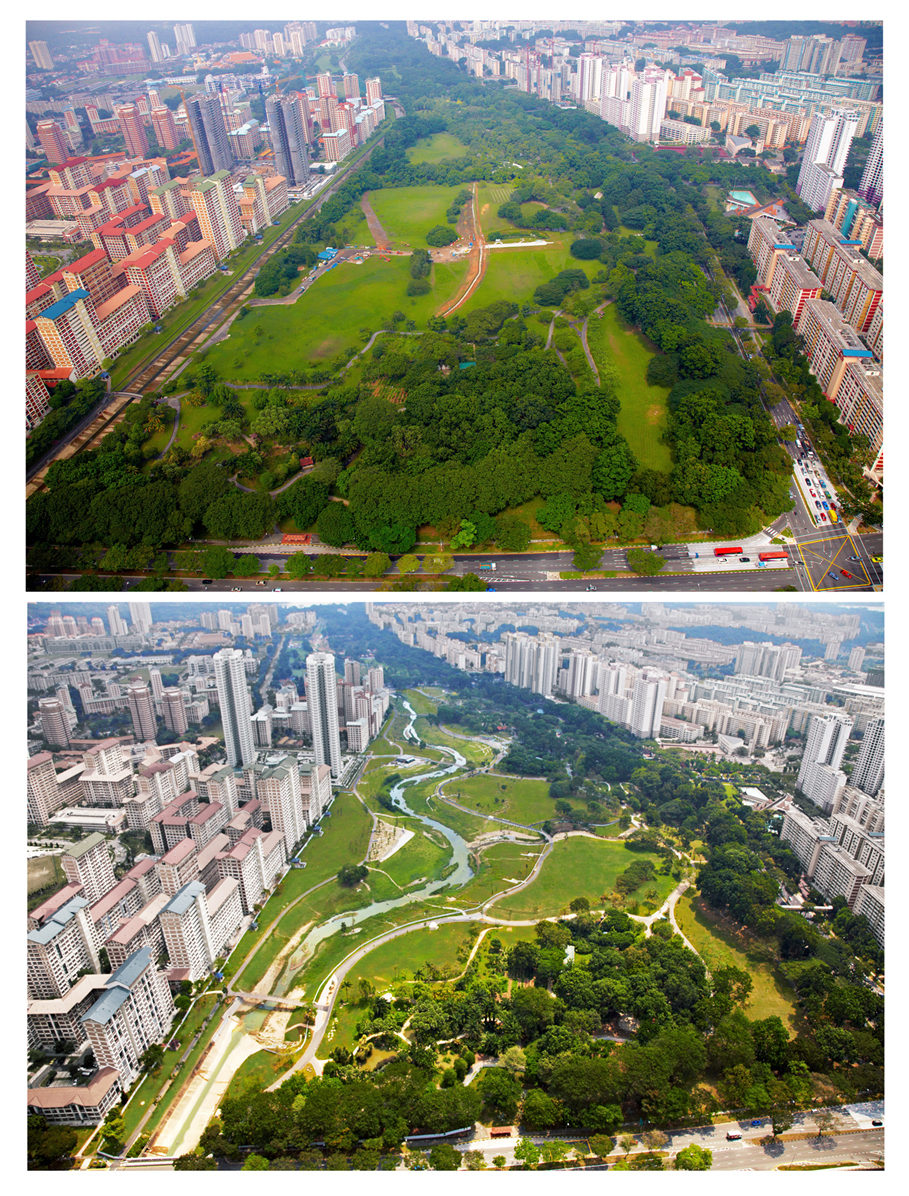
Aerial photography before (top) and after (bottom) the opening of the park

=== Background ===
The Active, Beautiful, Clean Waters (ABC Waters) Programme was launched in 2006 to transform the country’s water bodies beyond their functions of drainage and water supply into beautiful and clean rivers and lakes with new spaces for community bonding and recreation. At the same time, it promotes the application of a new, water-sensitive urban design approach (also known as ABC Waters design features in Singapore) to managing rainwater sustainably. A long-term initiative, over 100 locations have been identified for project implementation in phases by 2030, with 20 projects already completed, bringing people closer to water.

ABC Waters Kallang River @ Bishan–Ang Mo Kio Park is one of the flagship projects under this programme. The park was due for major refurbishment and the Kallang River in the form of a concrete channel along the park edges was also due for upgrading to cater to increased rainwater runoff from the catchment due to urbanisation. Plans were thus made to carry out redevelopment works together, transforming Kallang River from a linear utilitarian concrete drainage channel into a meandering, natural river through the park.

=== Design process ===
The integration of the river and park involved joint responsibilities between government agencies in charge of different areas, such as parks and water. The Public Utilities Board (PUB) which is Singapore's national water agency, and NParks engaged Ramboll Studio Dreiseitl, and CH2M (operated as CH2M Hill when the park was built) to evaluate how the park, river and surrounding residential estates could be integrated as one. This took place through a series of workshops, on-site tours and discussions where issues were thrown out and ideas were exchanged and debated. The suitability of plant species for soil bioengineering, for example, had not been implemented in Singapore prior to this, and thus had to be tested, done through a year-long survey at the test reach. Other parties which came on board included bioengineering specialists and horticulturists

=== Project details and cost ===
The project management and lead design were handled by Tobias Baur, Rudolf Mager, Leonard Ng, and Hendrik Porst, with project engineers Andreas Bockmühl and Stefan Brückmann overseeing the technical aspects. Bioengineering was handled by Peter Geitz und Partner JV, with CH2M serving as a partner. The project was commissioned by PUB, Singapore’s national water agency, and the National Parks Board. Covering 62 hectares, the project's design phase spanned from 2007 to 2010, with construction taking place from 2009 to 2012. The total cost of the project amounted to 76 million SGD.

=== Opening ===
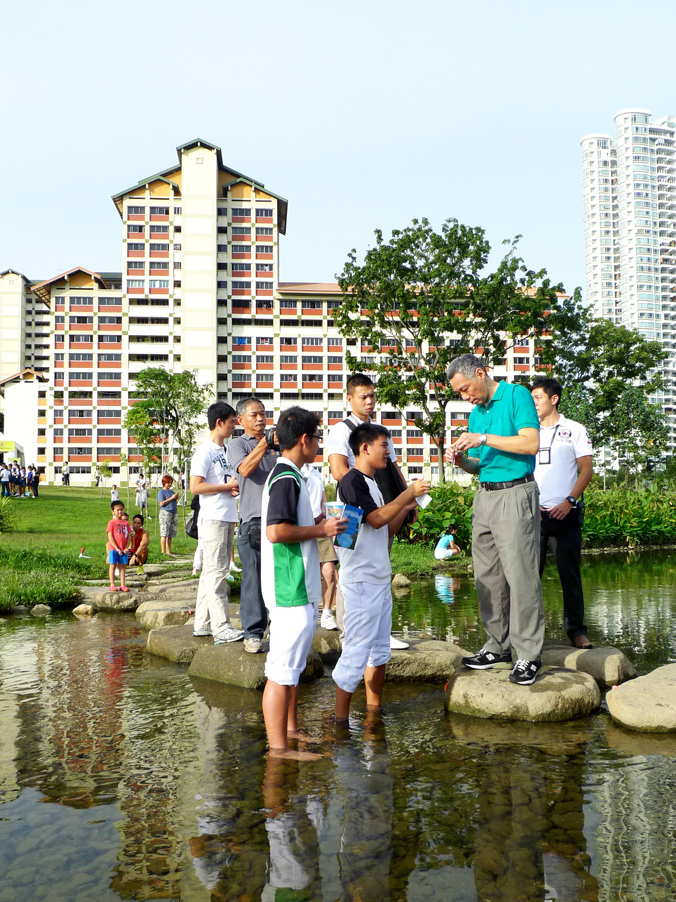
Prime Minister of Singapore Lee Hsien Loong and students from Raffles Institution during the opening of the park

On 17 March 2012, then Prime Minister Lee Hsien Loong officially opened the redeveloped park, renaming it Bishan–Ang Mo Kio Park. It was spectated by a crowd of around 2000 people, including residents and local community partners, such as schools and non-profit groups.

== Awards ==
The project received several awards, including the WAF 2012 Excellence on the Waterfront Honor Award and the President’s Design Award Singapore in 2012.

== Activities ==
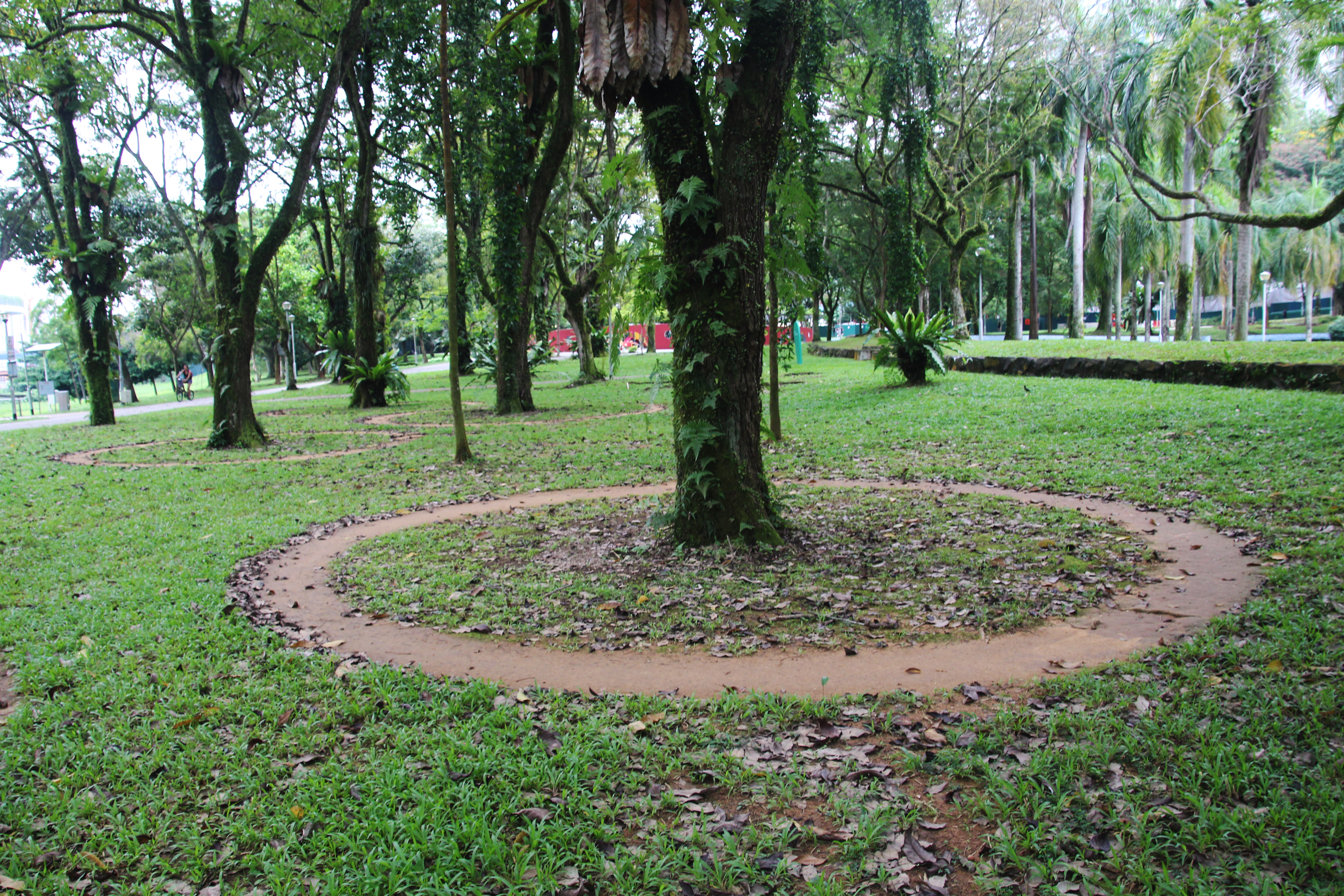
Tree circles in the park created by Energy Bagua practitioners

There are regular group exercise sessions organised in the morning at Bishan–Ang Mo Kio Park, including qigong and chapteh exercise sessions. Energy Bagua practitioners also often engage in bagua walks in the park by repeatedly walking in circles around trees to increase their vitality and replenish their positive energy. In addition, outdoor yoga sessions are also organised monthly at Ficus Green.

NParks conducts a guided 'Ecolife' tour for families during school holidays.

== See also ==
- Kallang River
- Herbert Dreiseitl
- National Parks Board
- List of parks in Singapore
