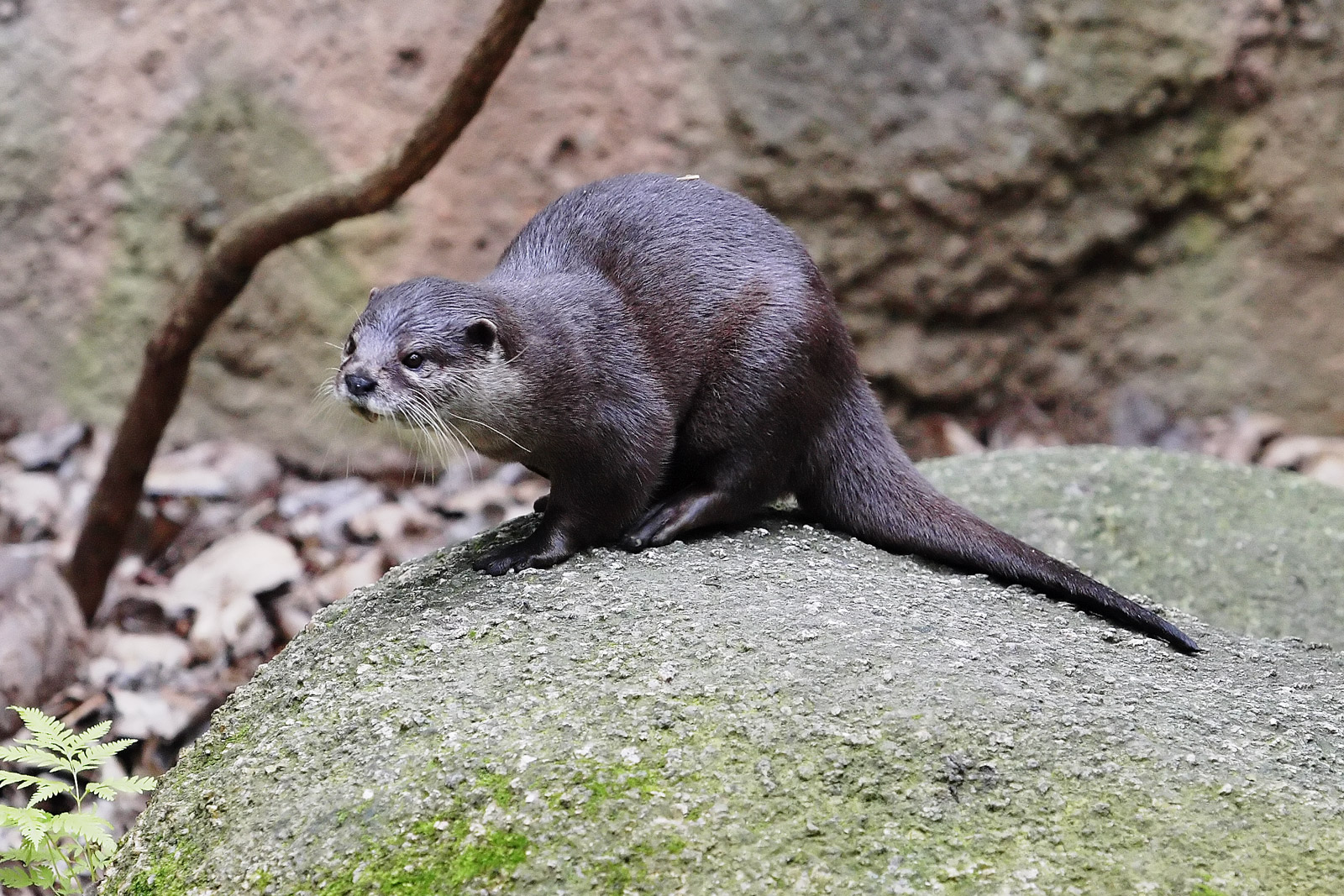
- At Melbourne Zoo, Australia

Conservation status
- Vulnerable (IUCN 3.1)
- CITES Appendix I

Scientific classification
- Kingdom: Animalia
- Phylum: Chordata
- Class: Mammalia
- Order: Carnivora
- Family: Mustelidae
- Genus: Lutra
- Subgenus: Amblonyx; Rafinesque, 1832
- Species: L. cinerea

Binomial name
- Lutra cinerea Illiger, 1815
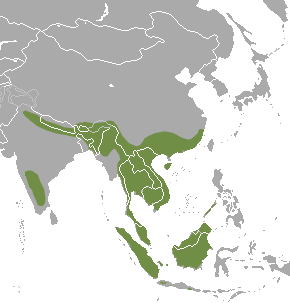
- Asian small-clawed otter native range (in green)

Synonyms
- Amblonyx cinereus Aonyx cinereus

= Asian small-clawed otter =

Species of mammal

The Asian small-clawed otter (Lutra cinerea), also called oriental small-clawed otter and small-clawed otter, is an otter species native to South and Southeast Asia. It is the only species of the subgenus Amblonyx in the genus Lutra. It has short claws that do not extend beyond the pads of its webbed digits. With a total body length of 730 to 960 mm (28.6 to 37.6 in), and a maximum weight of 3.5 kg (7.7 lb), it is the smallest otter species.

The Asian small-clawed otter lives in riverine habitats, freshwater wetlands and mangrove swamps. It feeds on molluscs, crabs and other small aquatic animals. It lives in pairs, but also has been observed in family groups with up to 12 individuals. It is listed as Vulnerable on the IUCN Red List, and is threatened by habitat loss, pollution, and in some areas also by hunting.

== Taxonomy ==
Lutra cinerea was the scientific name proposed by Johann Karl Wilhelm Illiger in 1815 for an otter collected in Batavia. In the 19th and 20th centuries, several zoological specimens were described:

- Lutra leptonyx proposed by Thomas Horsfield in 1824 were two adult small-clawed otters collected in Java. It was subordinated to the genus Aonyx by John Edward Gray in 1843.
- Lutra concolor proposed by Constantine Samuel Rafinesque in 1832 was a uniform coloured otter from Assam. Rafinesque also proposed Amblonyx as name for a subgenus for otters with short, obtuse claws.
- Amblonyx cinerea nirnai proposed by Reginald Innes Pocock in 1940 was a dark brown small-clawed otter from Virajpet in South India.

=== Phylogeny ===
Results of a mitochondrial cytochrome B analysis published in 1998 indicated that it should be subordinated to the genus Aonyx. Results of a molecular study published in 2008 showed that the Asian small-clawed otter is a sister taxon of Lutrogale, lending support to retaining the genus Amblonyx or expanding Aonyx to make it monophyletic. They genetically diverged about 1.5 million years ago.

The Asian small-clawed otter groups with the African clawless otter (Aonyx capensis) and the smooth-coated otter (Lutrogale perspicillata) into a sister clade with the genus Lutra. Hybridisation of Asian small-clawed otter females with smooth-coated otter males occurred in Singapore. The resulting offspring and their descendants bred back into the smooth-coated otter population, but maintained the genes of their small-clawed otter ancestors; a population of at least 60 hybrid otters are present in Singapore as of 2016.

== Characteristics ==
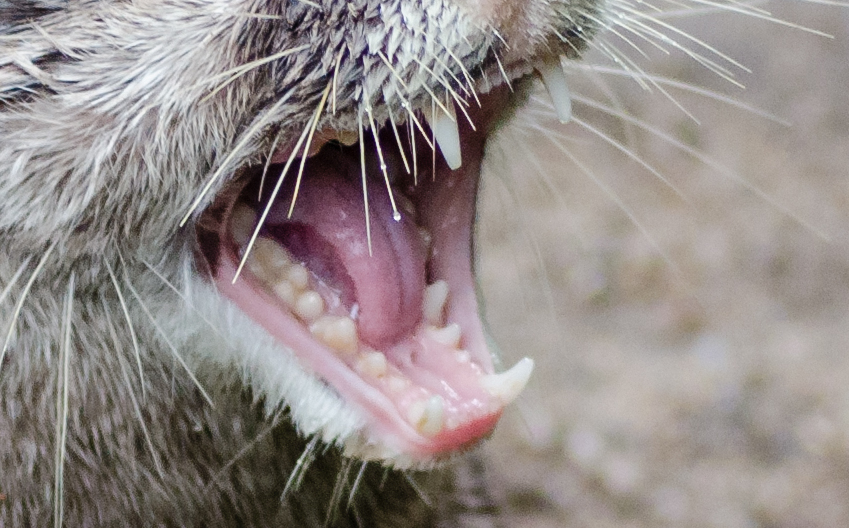
Closeup of a small-clawed otter's mouth

The Asian small-clawed otter has deep brown fur with some rufous tinge on the back, but paler below. Its underfur is lighter near the base. The sides of the neck and head are brown, but its cheeks, upperlip, chin, throat and sides of the neck are whitish. Its skull is short, and the naked rhinarium rounded above. The muzzle has long coarse vibrissae on either side. Its eyes are located toward the front of the head. The small ears are oval-shaped with an inconspicuous tragus and antitragus. Its paws are narrow with short digits that are webbed to the last joint. There are short hairs on the lower sides of the interdigital webs. The four-lobed plantar pads are longer than wide. The claws are short, almost erect, and in some individuals even absent. Females have four mammary glands.

The Asian small-clawed otter is the smallest otter species in Asia. In head-to-body length, it ranges from 470 to 610 mm (18.4 to 24 in) with a 260 to 350 mm (10.2 to 13.6 in) long tail. The tapering tail is thick and muscular, especially at the base, and more than half the length of the body. Hind feet are 97 to 102 mm (3.8 to 4 in) long. Length of skull ranges from 3.3 to 3.7 in (84 to 94 mm). It does not have upper premolars and only four cheek teeth above. Adult captive otters range in weight from 2.7 to 3.5 kg (6.0 to 7.7 lb).

== Distribution and habitat ==
The Asian small-clawed otter's native range comprises parts of India to Southeast Asia including the islands of Sumatra, Java, Borneo and Palawan. It lives in freshwater wetlands such as swamps, meandering rivers, irrigated rice fields as well as estuaries, coastal lagoons and tidal pools. It occurs in West Bengal, Assam and Arunachal Pradesh, and in coastal regions of Odisha. In Karnataka, Nilgiri and Palni hills in Tamil Nadu, it lives in shallow mountain creeks up to an elevation of 2,000 m (6,600 ft). In West Java, it inhabits areas along slow-flowing irrigation channels, pond areas and rice fields surrounded by vegetation that offers shelter. It also occurs in mangrove forests. In February 2025, the Asian small-clawed otter was photographed in Dadeldhura District in far-western Nepal.

In the 1980s, a few Asian small-clawed otters escaped from captivity in England and established a population in the wild. It was likely driven out by the recovery of the native Eurasian otter.

== Behaviour and ecology ==
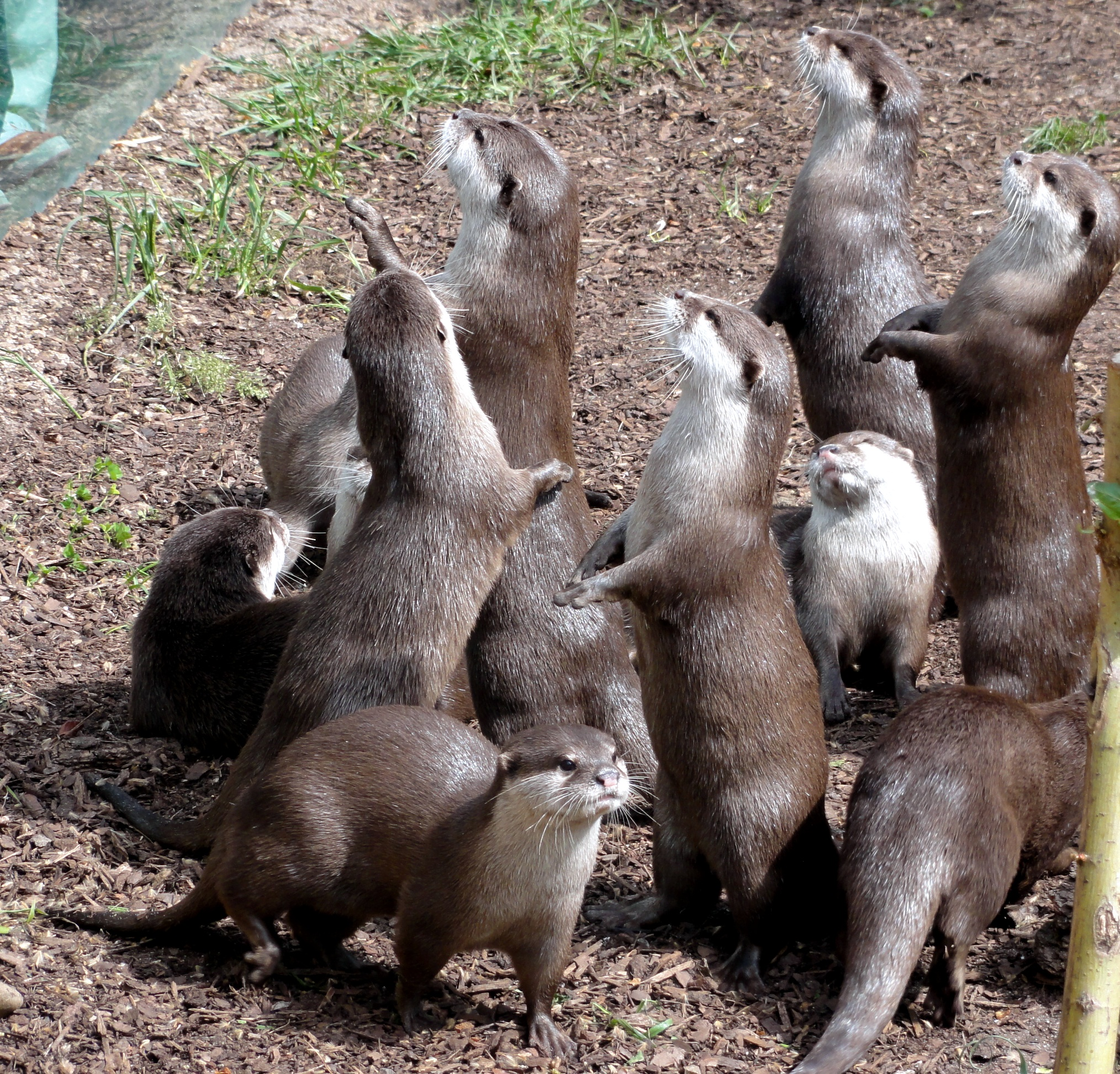
Family group of Asian small-clawed otters

The Asian small-clawed otter is mostly active after dark. It lives in groups of up to 15 individuals. In the Bangladesh Sundarbans, 53 individuals were recorded in 351 km (218 mi) of water courses in 13 locations between November 2014 and March 2015. Group size ranged from one to 12 individuals. Group members communicate using 12 or more distinct calls, and utter a variety of yelps and whimpers. When disturbed, they scream to rally the help of others.

When swimming on the surface, otters row with the forelimbs and paddle with the hind limbs. When diving under water, they undulate their bodies and tails. Captive otters swim at speeds of 0.7–1.2 m/s (2.3–3.9 ft/s).

Observations of wild Asian small-clawed otters revealed that they smear their spraint at latrine sites, using their hind feet and tails. Large groups smeared more than groups of three or fewer animals. The frequency of latrines with smeared scats varied in different locations, indicating a preference for certain sites. Spraint smearing most likely facilitates social ties among group members and is associated with territorial marking displays. They use grassy or sandy banks for resting, sun bathing and grooming. In marshes, they mostly use islands.

=== Diet ===
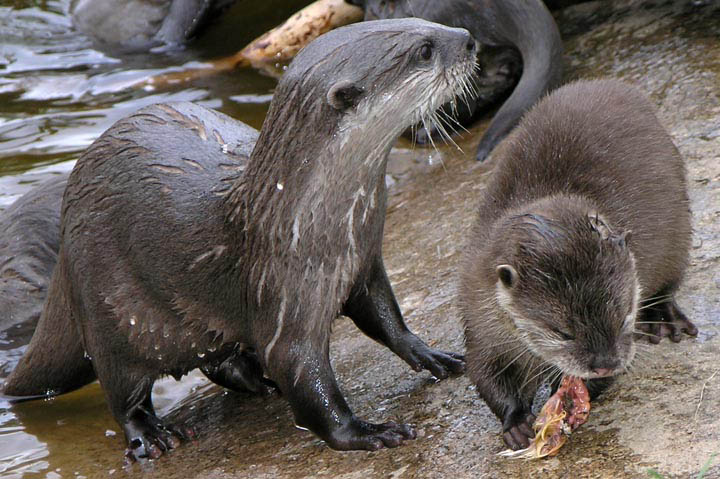
Asian small-clawed otters feeding in Edinburgh Zoo

The Asian small-clawed otter feeds mainly on crabs, mudskippers and Trichogaster fish. Its diet varies seasonally. When and where available, it also catches snakes, frogs, insects, rats and ricefield fish like catfish, Anabas testudineus and Channa striata. The size of crabs found in spraints in Huai Kha Khaeng Wildlife Sanctuary ranged in carapace width from 10 to 44 cm (3.9 to 17.3 in). Captive Asian small-clawed otters were observed to leave shellfish in the sun so the heat causes them to open, making it possible for them to eat them without having to crush the shells.

=== Reproduction ===
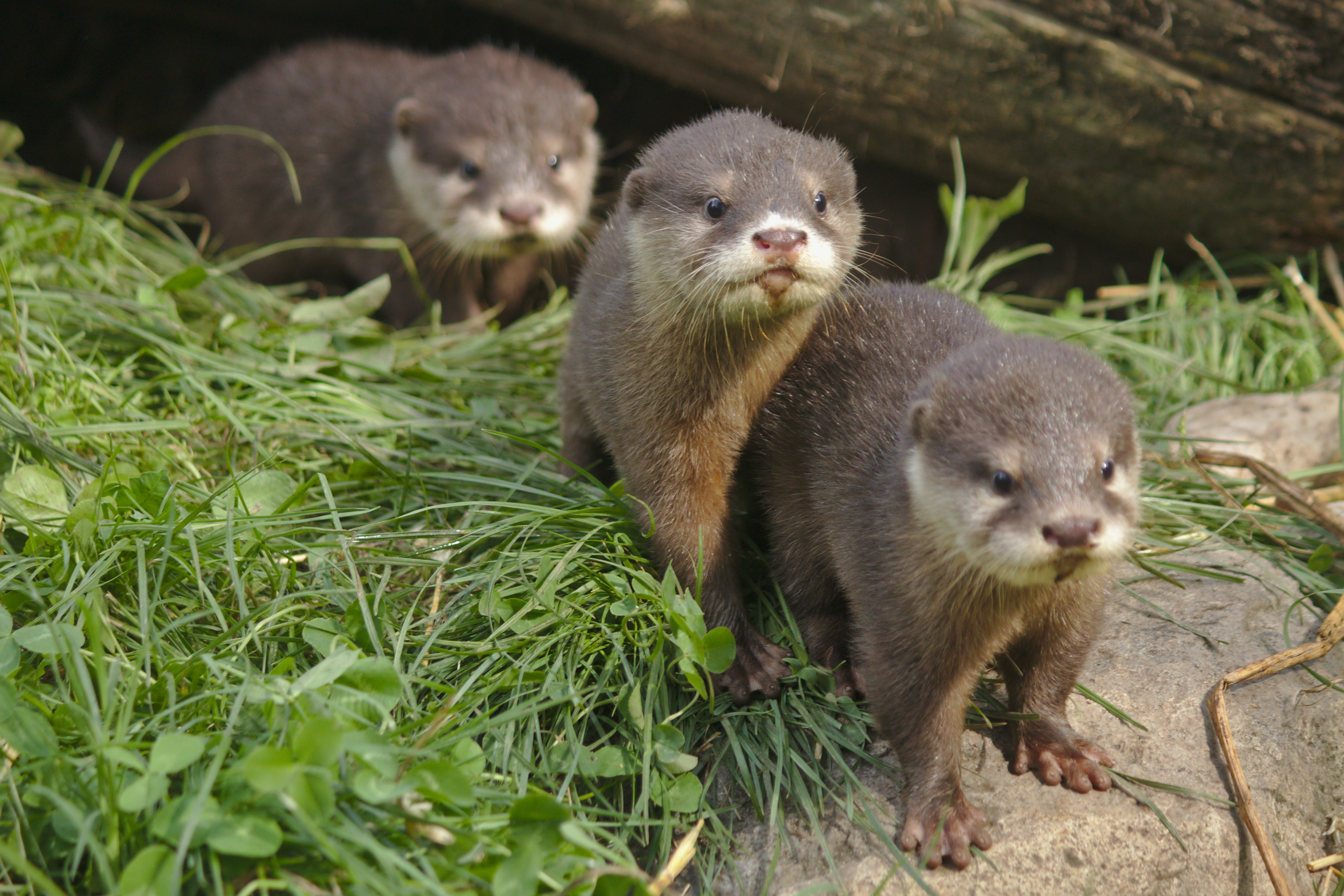
Captive pups

Information about the Asian small-clawed otter's mating and breeding behaviour has been studied in captive environments. Captive pairs are monogamous. The estrous cycle of females lasts 28 to 30 days with estrus lasting between one and 13 days. Usually, mating takes place in the water. Gestation lasts 62 to 86 days. Interval between births is at least eight months. About two weeks before parturition, both female and male engage in building a nest. They collect grass, hay or straw and carry this material into the breeding chamber. Between one and seven pups are born in a litter. Pups are born with closed eyes, which open in the fifth week. Newborn pups weigh between 45.6 and 62.5 g (1.61 and 2.20 oz) and reach a weight of 410–988 g (14.5–34.9 oz) after 60 days. They start exploring the environs of the breeding den at the age of ten weeks. At about three months, they enter and paddle in shallow water under the guidance of the mother. They become independent at the age of four to five months.

== Threats ==
The Asian small-clawed otter is threatened by poaching for its fur, loss and destruction of habitats such as hill streams, peat swamp forests and mangrove forests for aquaculture projects. Threats in India include deforestation, conversion of natural habitat for tea and coffee plantations, overfishing of rivers and water pollution through pesticides. It is the most sought after otter species for the illegal pet trade in Asia. At least 711 Asian small-clawed otters were offered for sale through online websites by 280 traders in Indonesia, Thailand, Malaysia and Vietnam between 2016 and 2017; more than 70% of them were less than one year old. Between December 2015 and October 2018, 49 Asian small-clawed otters were confiscated from wildlife traffickers in Thailand, Vietnam and Japan; 35 of them were bound for sale in Japan.

== Conservation ==
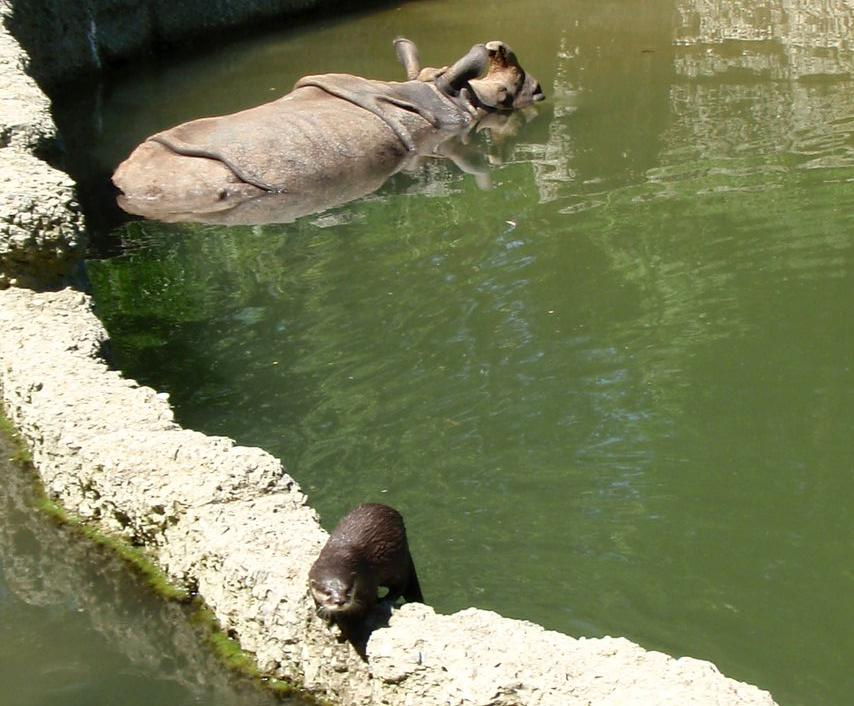
Asian small-clawed otter swimming with Indian rhinoceros at Zoo Basel

The Asian small-clawed otter was listed on CITES Appendix II and is protected in almost all range countries prohibiting its killing. Since August 2019, it is included in CITES Appendix I, thus strengthening its protection in regards to international trade.

Conservation efforts include protecting forests, rivers, and any environments where these otters live. Research in India found that fishing, sand mining or even changing anything in the otter shelter can damage the otters' habitats. The Houston Zoo supports researchers who monitor the otters and work with locals to protect them.

=== In captivity ===
The Association of Zoos and Aquariums established a Species Survival Plan for the Asian small-clawed otter in 1983 to encourage research on captive breeding.

In Europe, Zoo Basel keeps Asian small-clawed otters together with Indian rhinoceros. In Tallinn Zoo, Asian small-clawed otters share an enclosure with a binturong.

Asian small-clawed otters with osteoporosis display resorption of hyperactive bone and cartilage by osteoclasts in many bone sites, which causes pockmarks on all the bones. The Laboratory of Veterinary Advanced Diagnosis and Treatment studied a nine year old otter in Japan with a bad knee ligament injury. This otter received conservative treatment and maintained a stable condition during the follow up periods.
