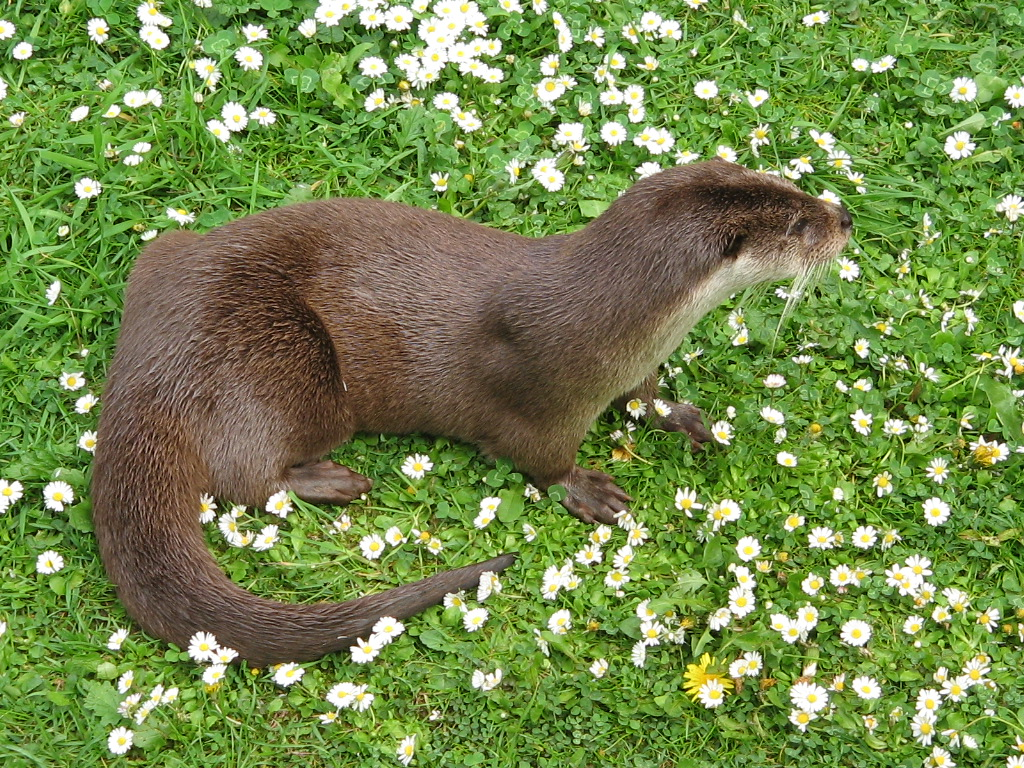
- Eurasian otter (Lutra lutra)

Scientific classification
- Kingdom: Animalia
- Phylum: Chordata
- Class: Mammalia
- Infraclass: Placentalia
- Order: Carnivora
- Family: Mustelidae
- Genus: Lutra
- Subgenus: Lutra; Brisson, 1762

Type species
- Mustela lutra Linnaeus, 1758

Species
- Lutra lutra; Lutra sumatrana; †Lutra nippon
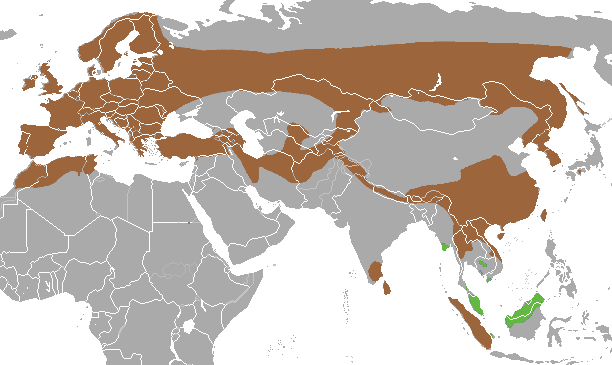
- Range of Lutra lutra (brown), Lutra sumatrana (green)

= Lutra (Lutra) =

Genus of carnivores

Lutra is a subgenus of otters in the genus Lutra.

== Taxonomy and evolution ==
The subgenus includes these species:

=== Extant species ===
Genus Lutra – Brisson, 1762 – two species
Common name	Scientific name and subspecies	Range	Size and ecology	IUCN status and estimated population
Eurasian otter	Lutra lutra (Linnaeus, 1758)	coasts of Europe, many parts of Asia, and parts of northern Africa	Size: Habitat: Diet:	NT
Hairy-nosed otter	Lutra sumatrana (Gray, 1865)	Southeast Asia	Size: Habitat: Diet:	EN

=== Extinct species ===
Image	Scientific name	Common name	Distribution
	Lutra nippon	Japanese otter	Japan

- †Lutra affinis
- †Lutra bressana
- †Lutra bravardi
- †Lutra castiglionis
- †Lutra euxena
- †Lutra fatimazohrae
- †Lutra franconica
- †Lutra hearsti
- †Lutra palaeindica
- †Lutra simplicidens
- †Lutra trinacriae
- †Lutraexemia umbra
- †Sardolutra ichnusae
- †Megalenhydris barbaricina
- †Algarolutra majori
- †Cyrnaonyx antiqua

The genus most likely evolved in Asia during the late Pliocene epoch; the oldest fossil belonging to the genus is of the species L. palaeindica, and dates from the late Pliocene.

== Habitat ==
Lutra species are semiaquatic mammals, so they are well-adapted to both water and land. They prefer shallow, narrow areas of streams surrounded by mature trees and with rocks, especially where weirs reduce the flow of the water, as well as attract fishes. They seem to tolerate roads and residential and agricultural areas, but only moderate human interaction. They clearly avoid areas without vegetation cover and rocks.

== Diet ==
The otters' diets consist mainly of fish (hence, the aquatic environment). However, during the winter and in colder environments, fish consumption is significantly lower and the otters use other resources for their food supply. Their diets can consist of amphibians (mainly frogs and pond turtles), bird predation (mainly anserine species), small rodents, and invertebrates such as water beetles, snails, and crayfish. They have also feed on plants, specifically grasses. With this large diversity of prey and resources for their diets, otters are considered "opportunistic eaters".

== Behavior ==
Some otters live in solitude, while others live in groups.

Lutra species are known to exhibit strong territorial behavior. Family group territories are distinct from those of solitary male Lutra. In a family group, adult males can be seen patrolling and defending their territories while females will raise their cubs in a secure area within the males' territories. Additionally, a family group choose areas that are rich in resources to support their cubs during the first year. Solitary males, however, choose their territory for reproductive purposes and ensure they have access to breeding females. These territories are marked with spraints as a means to claim ownership and deter rivals. As a result, there are overlapping boundary zones that cause many conflicts between males and is resolved through threatening signals and avoidance.
