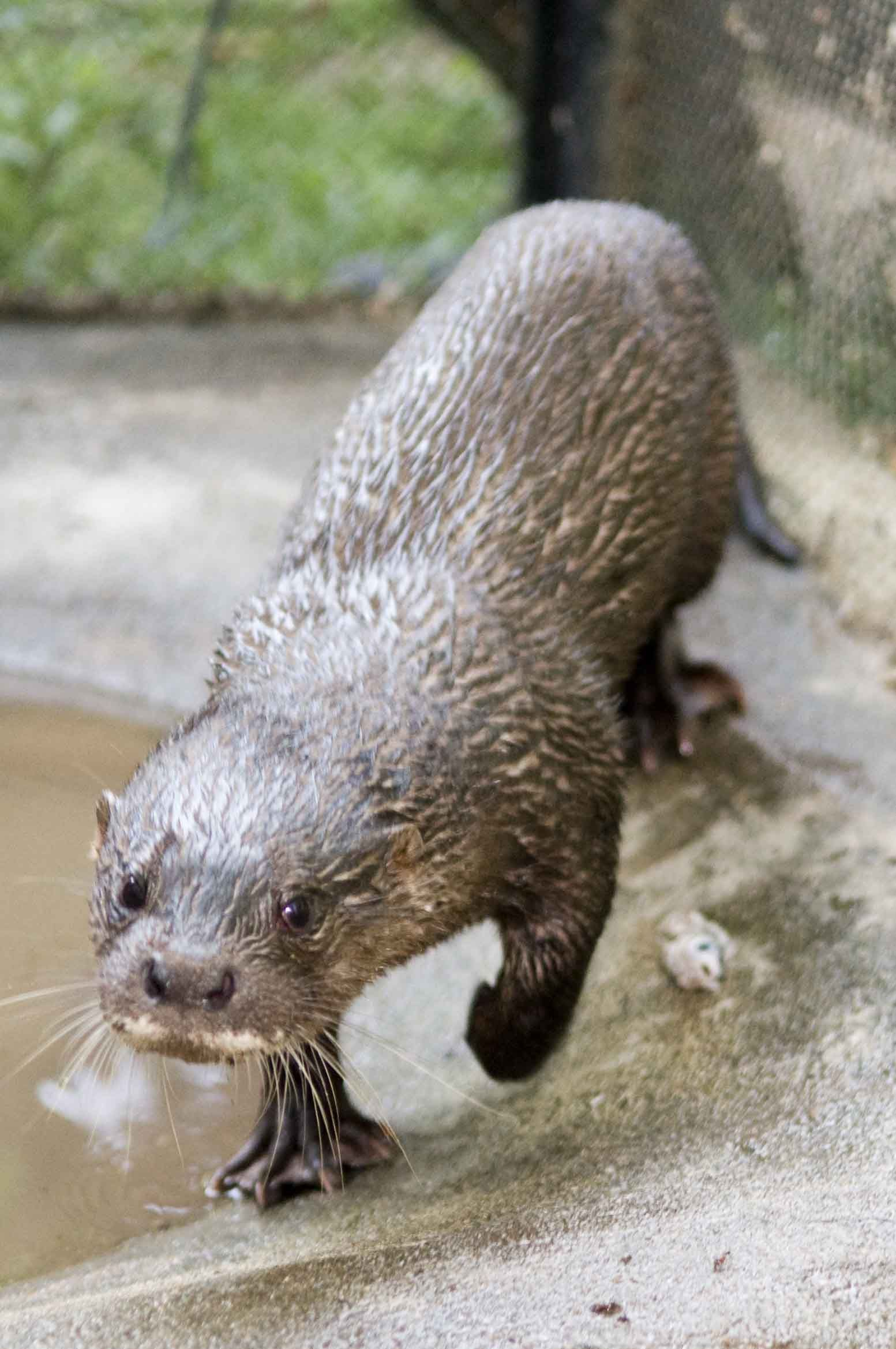
- Captive, originally from Cambodia

Conservation status
- Endangered (IUCN 3.1)
- CITES Appendix II

Scientific classification
- Kingdom: Animalia
- Phylum: Chordata
- Class: Mammalia
- Order: Carnivora
- Family: Mustelidae
- Genus: Lutra
- Subgenus: Lutra
- Species: L. sumatrana

Binomial name
- Lutra sumatrana (Gray, 1865)
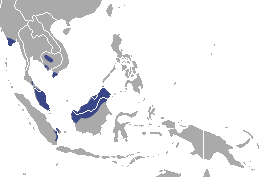
- Hairy-nosed otter range

Synonyms
- Lutra brunnea Pohle, 1920; Lutra lovii Günther, 1877; Barangia sumatrana

= Hairy-nosed otter =

Species of otter native to Southeast Asia

The hairy-nosed otter (Lutra sumatrana) is a semiaquatic mammal native to Southeast Asia and one of the rarest and least known otter species. It is threatened by loss of natural resources and poaching.

== Description ==
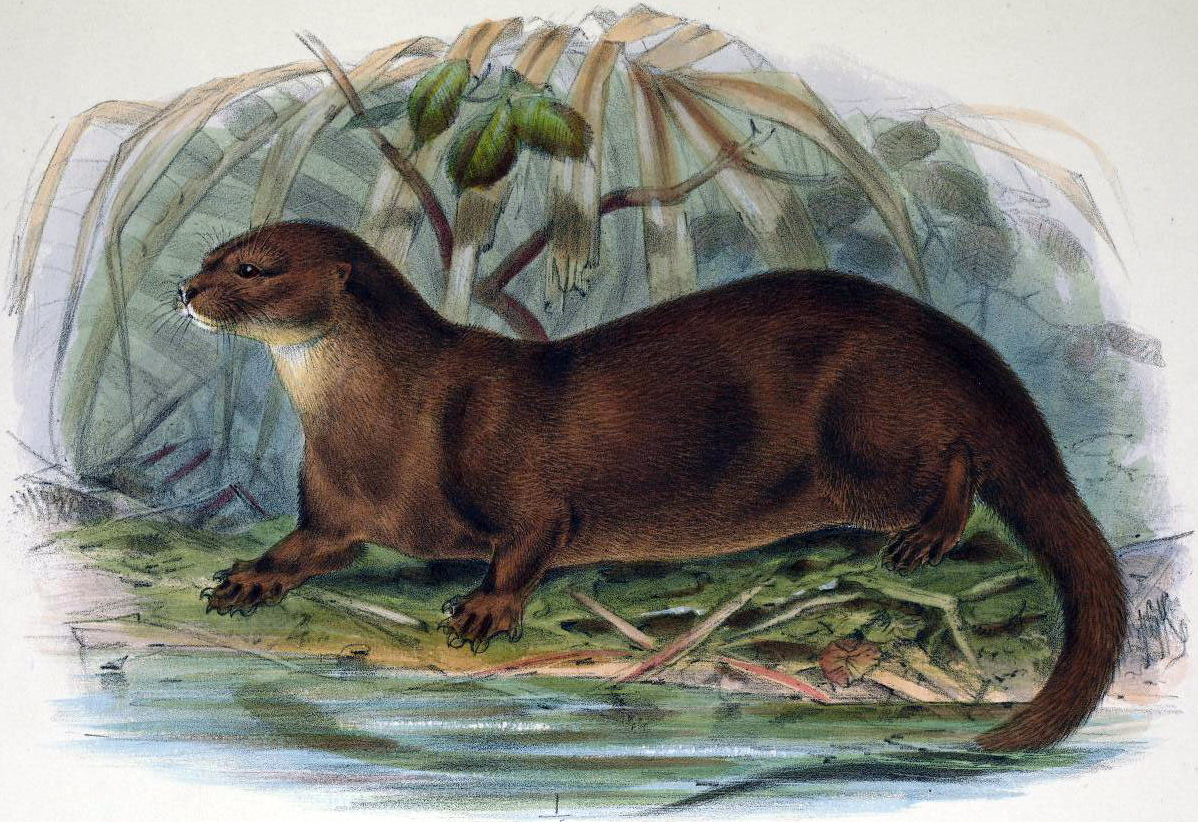
Illustration by John Gerrard Keulemans, 1878

The hairy-nosed otter has a short brown fur that becomes paler on the belly. It has a distinguished rhinarium which is fully covered with short dark hair "from the upper edge of the nostrils". Its upper lip and chin are whitish. Some individuals are reddish-chestnut in colour. Its body is long, its tail slender, and its fully webbed paws have prominent claws. Head-to-body length ranges from 57.5 to 82.6 cm (22.6 to 32.5 in), tail length from 35 to 50.9 cm (13.8 to 20.0 in), and weight from 5 to 8 kg (11 to 18 lb). Its skull is flatter than that of smooth-coated otter, and it has smaller teeth. Its forepaws are 5.8 cm (2.3 in) wide and smaller than the hind paws with about 6.6 cm (2.6 in).

== Distribution and habitat ==
Hairy-nosed otter in Danum Valley, Borneo, in September 2025

This hairy-nosed otter occurs in Southeast Asia from southern Thailand, Cambodia, southern Vietnam and Peninsular Malaysia to Sumatra and Borneo. It is locally extinct in India, Singapore and Myanmar, and possibly also in Brunei.

In Thailand, it was recorded in the Pru Toa Daeng peat swamp forest and in areas around the Bang Nara river. It mainly habits lowland flooded forests with climaxing vegetation in three levels: a primary forest zone, a secondary forest zone made up of Melaleuca cajuputi, and a third zone of grasslands. These tiers make the habitat hard to penetrate, providing protection from human disturbance and cover from predators (possibly including grey-headed fish eagles, feral dogs and reticulated pythons). The Bang Nara river habitat, where communities have been discovered, is tidal. The two reserves in Vietnam are both peat swamp forests, surrounded by 15 m high Melaleuca cajuputi, covered in dense lianas such as Stenochlaena palustris in its primary zone, and a second zone of meadows made up of Eleocharis dulcis. These two Vietnamese reserves contain many canals and floating aquatic plants like Eichhornia crassipes, Pistia stratiotes, Salvinia cucullata and Ipomoea aquatica to hunt and play in, with surrounding rice paddies as a third buffer zone.

In Cambodia, it was recorded in lowland flooded forest around Tonle Sap Lake. In Vietnam, it was sighted and recorded by camera traps in U Minh Thuong National Park in 2000, where also spraints were found with fish scales and remains of crabs. In 2008, it was also recorded in U Minh Ha National Park.

In Sumatra, a hairy-nosed otter was killed on a road next to the Musi River in 2005. In Sabah, historic records date to the late 19th century. In 2010, one individual was recorded for the first time by a camera trap in Deramakot Forest Reserve incidentally. In 2016, several individuals were sighted in Tabin Wildlife Reserve.

== Ecology and behavior ==
The hairy-nosed otter occurs in coastal areas and on larger inland rivers, solitary or in groups of up to four. Its diet includes fish, such as broadhead catfish, snakeheads, and climbing perch, and water snakes, mollusks, and crustaceans. During the dry season, individuals forage in drainage canals and ponds.

Pairing of a male and a female may be limited to the breeding period. The contact call between otters is a single-syllabic chirp. Adult females call to pups with a staccato chatter. Populations in Cambodia breed between November and March. The gestation period lasts around two months. A family of both parents and cubs were sighted between December and February.

== Threats ==
The hairy-nosed otter is threatened by the loss of natural resources and poaching.

== Conservation ==
The hairy-nosed otter is the rarest otter in Asia, most likely verging on extinction in the northern parts of its range and of uncertain status elsewhere. Only a few viable populations remain, widely scattered in region. The species is threatened by loss of lowland wetland habitats, hunting for fur and meat, and accidental killing during fishing.

=== In captivity ===
In June 2008, the Wildlife Alliance-led Wildlife Rapid Rescue Team received a donated hairy-nosed otter caught near Tonle Sap. Working with Conservation International, they established a safe home for the rescued otter at the Phnom Tamao Wildlife Rescue Centre, but the otter, which had been frequently sick throughout its life in captivity, died of unknown causes in February 2010. Phnom Tamao Wildlife Rescue Centre rescued another hairy-nosed otter in July 2010, and hope it will become part of a future captive breeding program. This is currently the only known hairy-nosed otter in captivity.
