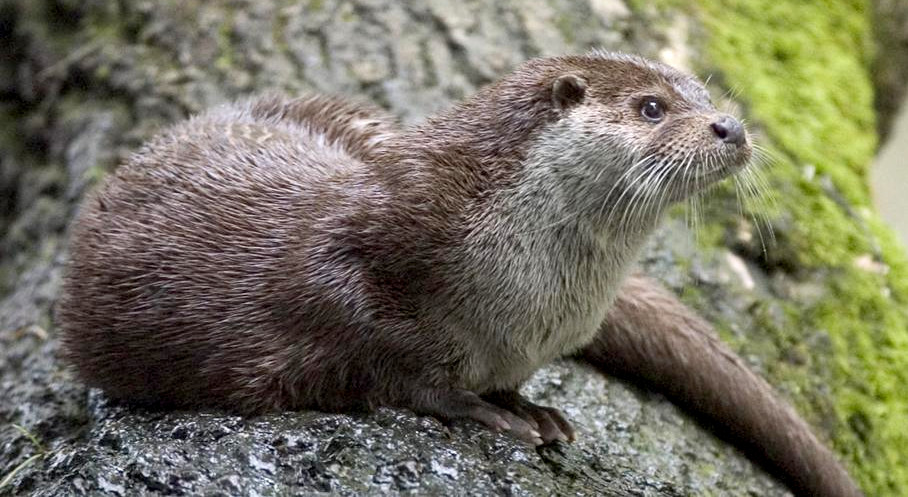

Conservation status
- Near Threatened (IUCN 3.1)
- CITES Appendix I

Scientific classification
- Kingdom: Animalia
- Phylum: Chordata
- Class: Mammalia
- Order: Carnivora
- Family: Mustelidae
- Genus: Lutra
- Subgenus: Lutra
- Species: L. lutra

Binomial name
- Lutra lutra (Linnaeus, 1758)
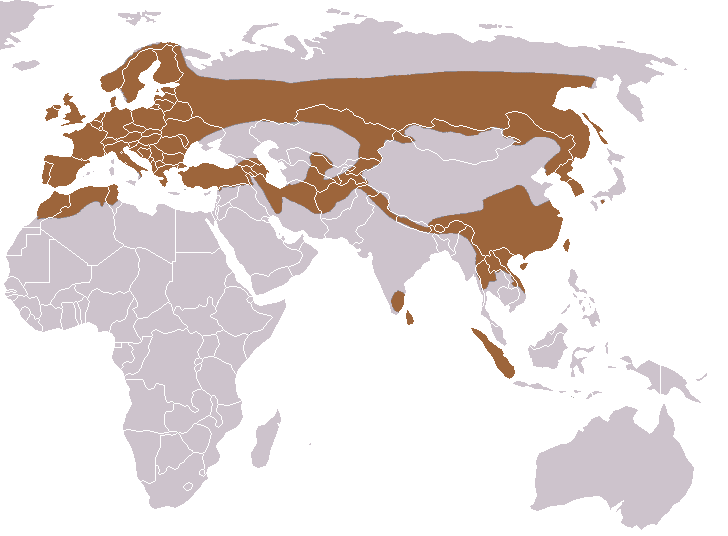
- Range map

Synonyms
- Mustela lutra Linnaeus, 1758; Lutra vulgaris Erxleben, 1777

= Eurasian otter =

Species of carnivore

The Eurasian otter (Lutra lutra), also known as the European otter, Eurasian river otter, European river otter, common otter, and Old World otter, is a semiaquatic mammal native to Eurasia and the Maghreb. It is the most widely distributed member of the otter subfamily (Lutrinae) of the weasel family (Mustelidae) and is found in the waterways and on the coasts of Europe, much of Asia, and parts of North Africa. The Eurasian otter eats mainly fish, and is strongly territorial. It is endangered in some parts of its range, but is recovering in others.

== Description ==
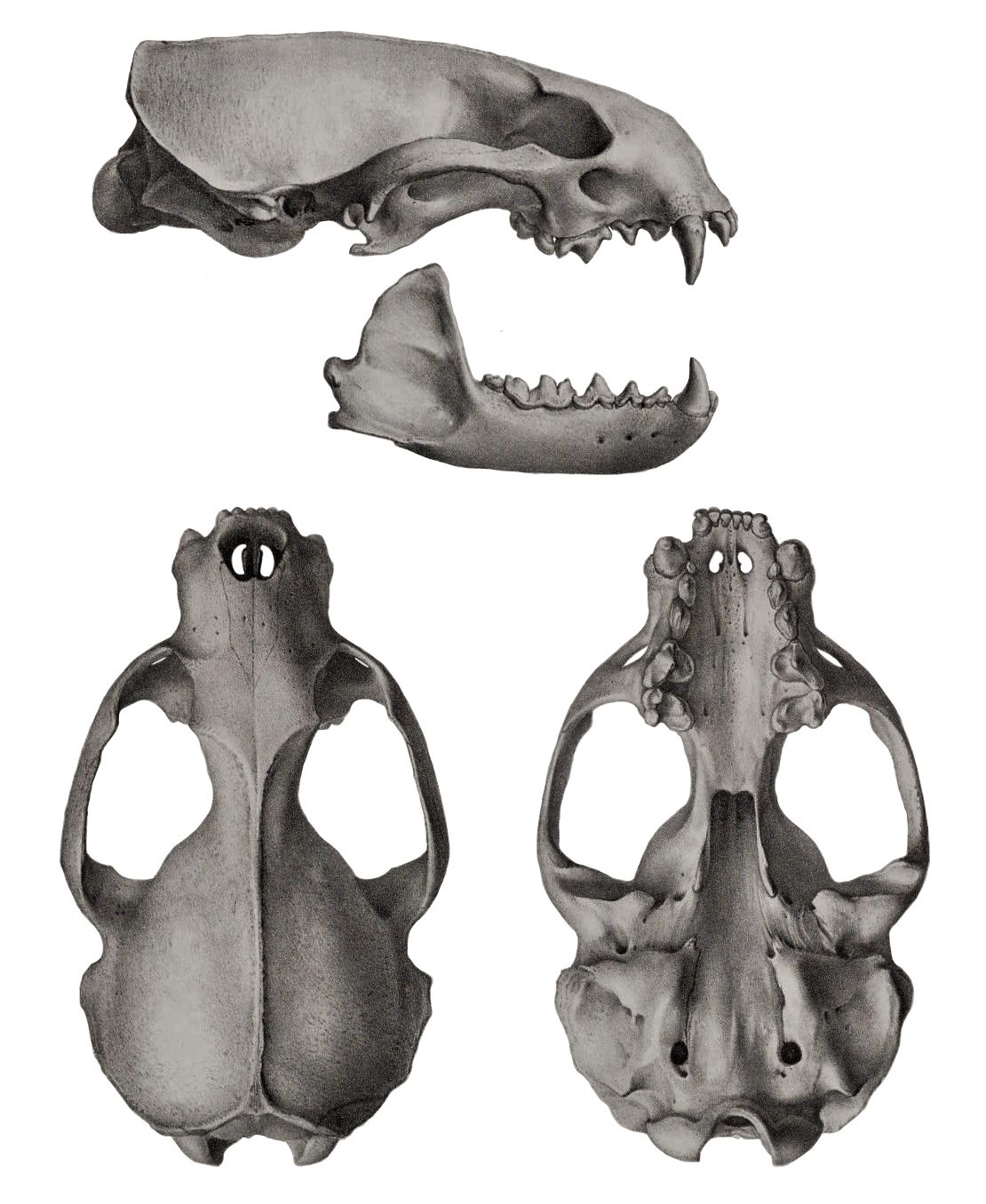
Skull

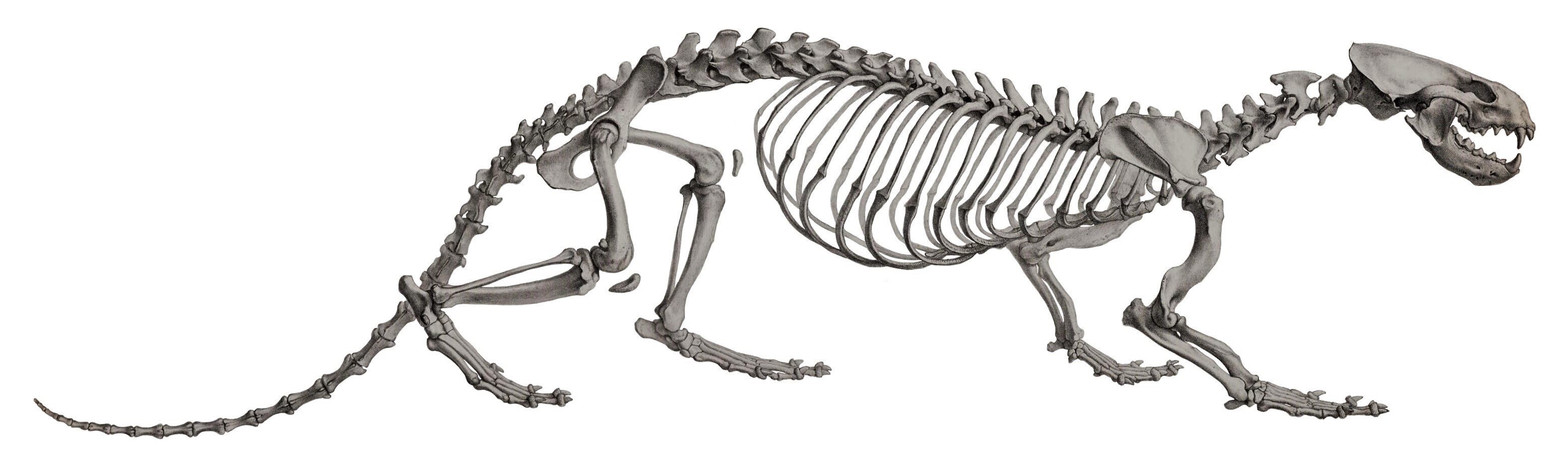
Skeleton

The Eurasian otter is a typical member of the otter subfamily. With brown fur on their backs and cream-coloured fur on their bellies, these long, slender creatures are well-equipped for their aquatic lifestyle. Their bones show osteosclerosis, which increases their density and reduces buoyancy. This otter differs from the North American river otter by its shorter neck, broader visage, the greater space between the ears and its longer tail. However, the Eurasian otter is the only otter in much of its range, so it is rarely confused for any other animal. Normally, this species is 57 to 95 cm (22.5 to 37.5 in) long, not counting a tail of 35–45 cm (14–17.5 in). The female is shorter than the male. The otter's average body weight is 7 to 12 kg (15 to 26 lb), although occasionally a large old male may reach up to 17 kg (37 lb). The record-sized specimen, reported by a reliable source but not verified, weighed over 24 kg (53 lb).

== Distribution and habitat ==
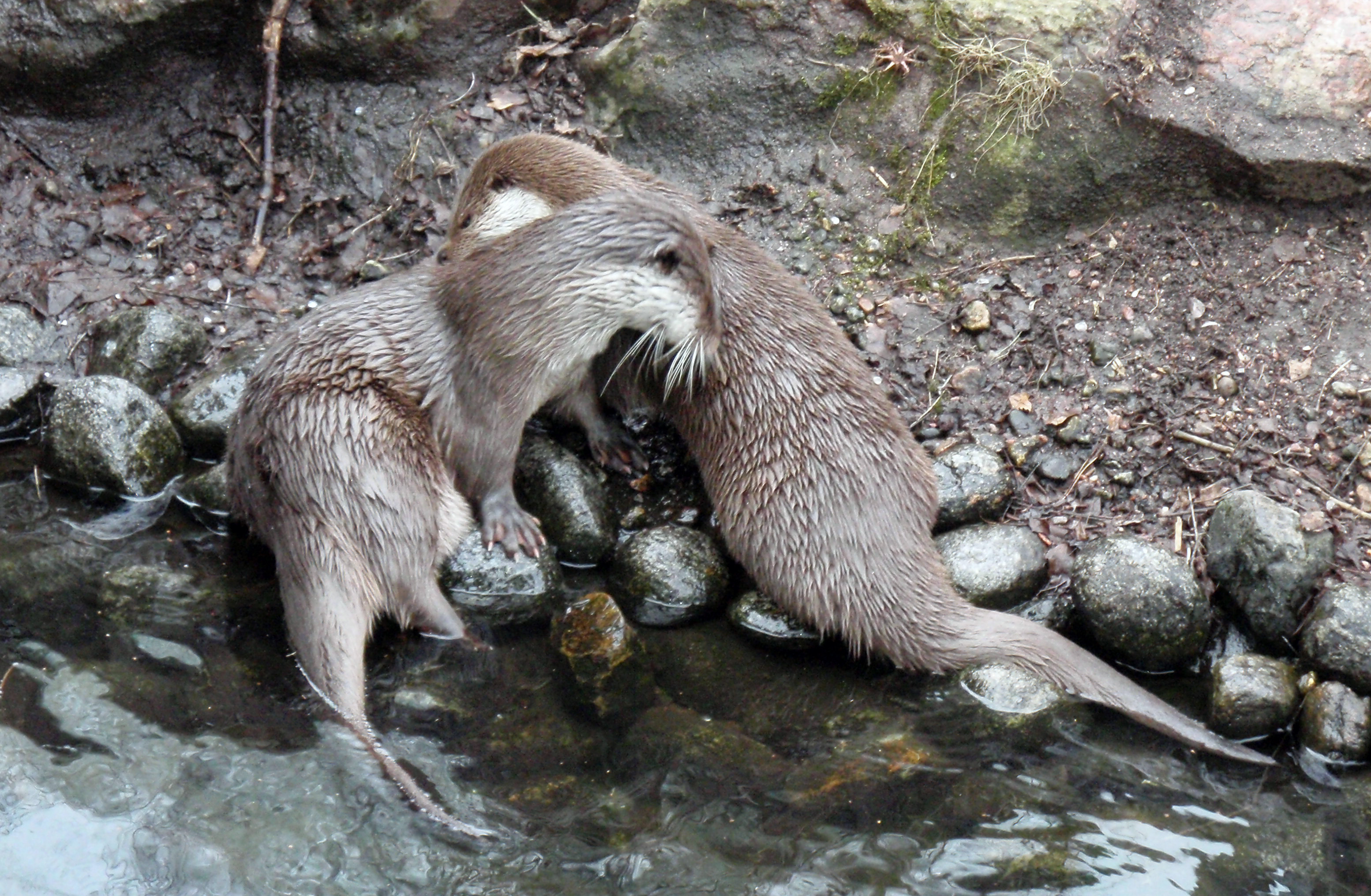
Two otters in Korkeasaari Zoo, Helsinki, Finland

The Eurasian otter is the most widely distributed otter species. Its range includes Europe, North Africa and parts of Asia as far as the Palestine region. Though currently thought to be extinct in Liechtenstein and Switzerland, it is now common in Latvia, along the coast of Norway, in the western regions of Spain and Portugal and across Great Britain and Ireland. In Italy, it lives in the southern part of the peninsula. It inhabits unpolluted bodies of fresh water such as lakes, streams, rivers, canals and ponds, as long as the food supply is adequate. In Andalusia, it uses artificial lakes on golf courses. It prefers the open areas of streams and also lives along the coast in salt water, but requires regular access to fresh water to clean its fur.

In Syria, the Eurasian otter was recorded in montane creeks in Latakia and Raqqa Governorates and in the lower Euphrates valley in Deir ez-Zor Governorate. In western Nepal, its presence was documented at elevations of around 1,600 m (5,200 ft) in Barekot river in Jajarkot District and at 1,337 m (4,386 ft) in Tubang river in Eastern Rukum District. In India, it is distributed in the Himalayan foothills, southern Western Ghats and the central Indian landscape.

In Kyrgyzstan, the Eurasian otter was considered to have disappeared after surveys did not yield any record of a stable breeding population; one Eurasian otter was sighted on the Turuk River in Khan-Tengiri Nature Park in 2025, but it remains unclear whether it was a solitary migrant or evidence of a surviving resident population.

== Behaviour and ecology ==
=== Diet ===
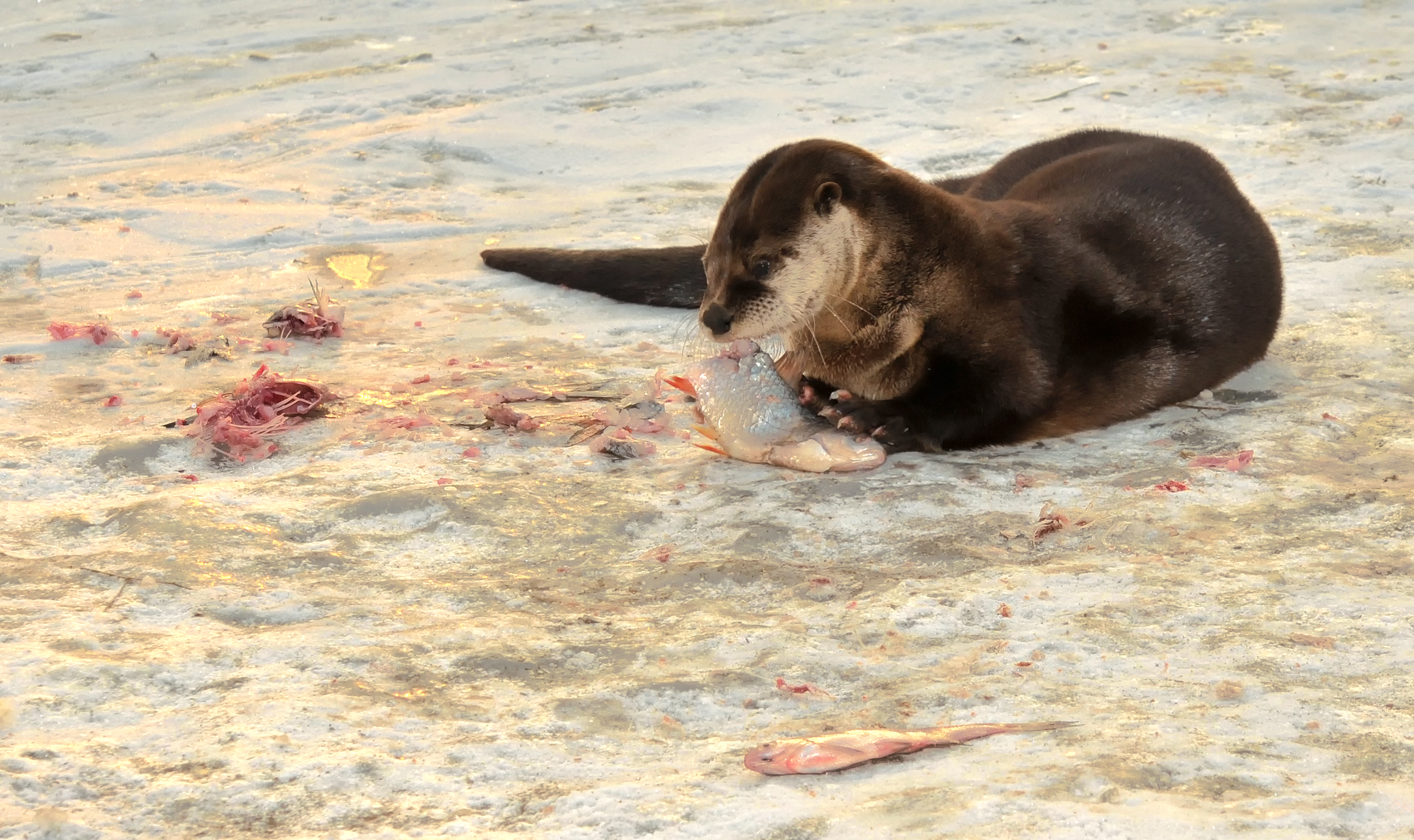
Otter feeding on fish

Video of Eurasian otters eating frozen fish in the Aquarium of Gijón, Spain

The Eurasian otter's diet consists primarily of fish, particularly in Mediterranean and temperate freshwater habitats where fish is most abundant. During winter and in cooler climates, the Eurasian otter's diet includes worms, caterpillars, clams, crustaceans, insects, eggs, birds, and small mammals, including young European beavers, and amphibians.

The Eurasian otter is capable of overpowering prey that is significantly larger than itself, and it occasionally hunts large waterbirds such as adult greylag geese.

=== Breeding ===
The Eurasian otter is strongly territorial and typically lives alone. The length of an individual's territory may vary in the range of 1 and 40 km (0.62–24.85 mi), with about 18 km (11 mi) being usual. The size of the territory depends on the availability of food and the width of suitable hunting grounds. It is shorter on coasts, where the available width is much greater, and longer on narrower rivers. The Eurasian otter uses its faeces, known as spraints, to mark its territory and prioritise the use of resources for other group members. The territories are only defended against members of the same sex, so the territories of males and females may overlap. Mating takes place in water. Males and females can breed at any time of the year, and the mating season is most likely determined by reproductive maturity and physiological state. Females reach sexual maturity at 18–24 months of age, with the average age of first breeding being 2 1/2 years. Gestation lasts 60–64 days, after which one to four pups are born, each weighing around 10% of the mother's body weight. The pups remain dependent on the mother for around 13 months. The male plays no direct role in parental care, although the territory of a female with her pups is usually entirely within that of the male.

== Taxonomy ==
The extinct Japanese otter is sometimes considered a subspecies. However, recent studies have found that it falls outside the subspecific clades comprising L. lutra, so it has been reclassified as a distinct species. Nevertheless, uncertainty remains.

== Conservation ==
The Eurasian otter declined across its range in the second half of the 20th century primarily due to pollution from polychlorinated biphenyls and pesticides such as organochlorine. Other threats included habitat loss and hunting, both legal and illegal. Eurasian otter populations are now recovering in many parts of Europe. In the United Kingdom, for example, the number of sites with an otter presence increased by 55% between 1994 and 2002. In August, 2011, the Environment Agency announced that otters had returned to every county in England, having previously disappeared from all but the West Country and parts of Northern England. Recovery is partly due to a ban on the most harmful pesticides that has been in place across Europe since 1979, partly to improvements in water quality leading to increases in prey populations, and partly to direct legal protection under the European Union Habitats Directive and national legislation in several European countries. In Hong Kong, it is a protected species under Wild Animals Protection Ordinance Cap 170. It is listed as Near Threatened by the IUCN Red List.

In Germany, the Eurasian otter is nearly extinct in the wild and is listed as critically endangered. As part of a protection and conservation effort the "Aktion Fischotterschutz" was founded in 1979, which aims to fund habitat protection and expansion. Further, the Hankensbüttler Otter Centre provides protection to the species in captivity.

It is listed as endangered in Pakistan, India, Bangladesh, Myanmar and Thailand, and critically endangered in Mongolia. In South Korea, it is listed as a Natural Monument and first-class endangered species.

Most species that experience population decline or habitat loss tend to eventually lose their genetic diversity due to inbreeding in small populations. A 2001 study examined whether or not the populations of Eurasian otters suffered from a lack of genetic variability. The study examined the teeth of otter skulls at the Zoological Museum, Copenhagen and the Natural History Museum, Aarhus. The samples were collected between 1883 and 1963 in Denmark (Funen, Zealand, and Jutland). The study examined the tissue on the teeth of the skulls and determined the genetic variability based on DNA analysis. The discovery was that despite the population declines, the Eurasian otter was not found to be subject to recent declining genetic variability. Instead, evidence of population bottlenecks ~2000 years ago were detected, possibly due to ancient anthropogenic pressure.

The decline in the population of native freshwater fish in the rivers of Iberia, which is the preferred food of Eurasian otters, along with the expansion of exotic species such as centrarchids, could potentially put Eurasian otters at risk of extinction.
