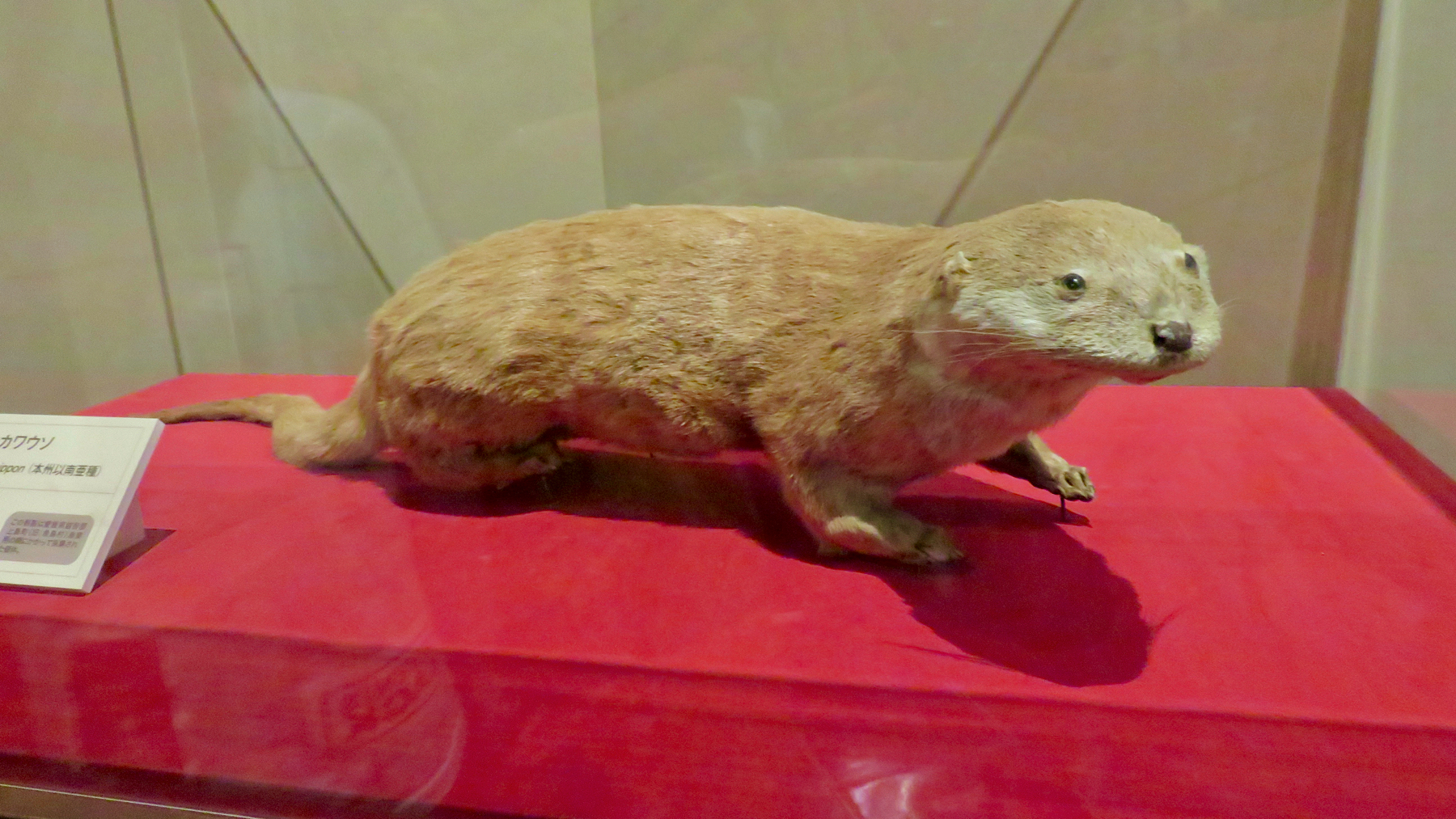

Conservation status
- Extinct (2012)

Scientific classification
- Kingdom: Animalia
- Phylum: Chordata
- Class: Mammalia
- Order: Carnivora
- Family: Mustelidae
- Genus: Lutra
- Subgenus: Lutra
- Species: †L. nippon

Binomial name
- †Lutra nippon Imaizumi & Yoshiyuki, 1989

Synonyms
- Lutra lutra nippon

= Japanese otter =

Species of otter

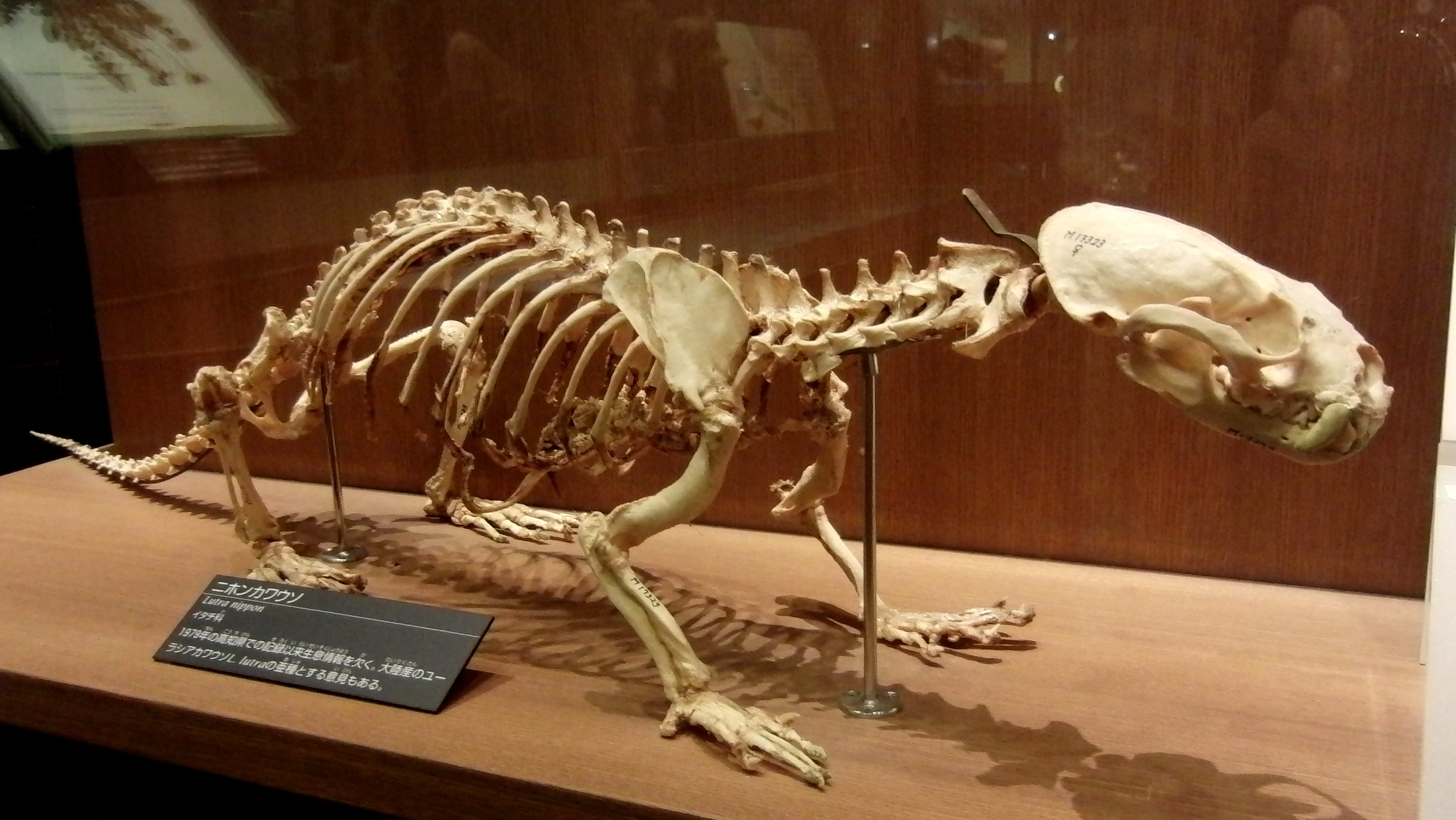
Skeleton of Japanese river otter. Exhibit in the National Museum of Nature and Science, Tokyo.

The Japanese otter (Japanese: ニホンカワウソ(日本川獺, Hepburn: Nihon-kawauso) (Lutra nippon) or Japanese river otter is an extinct species of otter formerly widespread in Japan.

Dating back to the 1880s, it was once even seen in Tokyo. The population suddenly shrank in the 1930s and nearly vanished. Since then, it has only been spotted in 1964 in the Seto Inland Sea, and in the Uwa Sea in 1972 and 1973. The last official sighting was in the southern part of Kōchi Prefecture in 1979, when it was photographed in the mouth of the Shinjo River in Susaki. It was subsequently classified as a "Critically Endangered" species on the Japanese Red List. On August 28, 2012, the Japanese otter was officially declared extinct by the Ministry of the Environment. It is the official animal symbol of Ehime Prefecture.

== Taxonomy ==
All river otters of Japan were described in the 19th century as a subspecies of the Eurasian otter, Lutra lutra whiteleyi. In the early 1990s, a comparison of mitochondrial cytochrome b of otters from Latvia and China, and a stuffed otter from Japan, made by Kōchi University, found that the Japanese otter belonged to a distinct species, which was named Lutra nippon.

This classification was not generally accepted in the absence of further verification, but later studies have reaffirmed a heavy level of genetic divergence between L. lutra and L. nippon, with a 2019 study finding L. nippon to fall outside the subspecific clade in L. lutra, and the American Society of Mammalogists has since reclassified it as a distinct species. However, according to the 2019 study, significant controversy remains over the status of L. nippon as a distinct species, and its taxonomic status thus remains uncertain.

Only the otters of Honshu, Kyushu, and Shikoku belong to L. nippon. The subspecific taxon L. l. whiteleyi is still valid for the also disappeared otter of Hokkaido.

== Description ==
Fully grown, a Japanese otter was between 65 and 80 cm (25.5 and 31.5 in) long, with a tail measuring 45 to 50 cm (17.5 to 19.5 in). It had a thick, lush coat of dark brown fur with short webbed feet. In addition the river otter had two types/sets of fur. Data has shown that the river otter would shed their under fur fully from May to August. After the shedding of the under fur, the otter shed their guard hair from August to November. This allowed them to adjust to the seasons changing. The otter had a lifespan of up to 25 years.

== Ecology and biology ==
=== Habits ===
A nocturnal creature, an otter left its den only after dark to forage for food. Claiming a territory about ten miles in diameter, it marked the area with its droppings about one to three miles apart and set up three or four nests under rocks or inside bushes. The otters were always on the move, visiting each den only once every three to four days. They were considered an adult after only one year. They would then venture on their own, but continue in solitude unless ready to mate.

=== Reproduction ===
In general, the Japanese otter was ready to reproduce when they were two to three years old. In addition, the males sought out the females in the reproduction process. Besides during reproduction and with the exception of young males staying with their mother for a range of two to three years until they were mature, female otters and male otters did not generally live together. When a male otter calls out to a female otter, she must give him permission for the mating. If she does not, the male would move onto the next female otter. For the male to know that the female is interested in mating, the female will roll around with the male, which releases hormones. The Japanese river otter could have anywhere from one to six offspring per litter. Once born, the baby otters are completely blind for a month, leaving them utterly helpless. The female otter makes for a great mother; nursing her young for up to eight hours a day, as well as teaching them valuable lessons and protecting them. After the pups are around the age of four months, the mother otter will introduce her youth to solid food and start to teach them how to hunt.

=== Diet ===
Like most otters, the Japanese otter was not an especially picky eater. While it primarily fed on fish, crab, and shrimp; it also ate eels, beetles, watermelons, and sweet potatoes. Many of these Japanese otters eat about 15% to 25% of their own body weight. Many otters spend around six hours to find food because of their difficult living space and their competition for food. The Japanese otter was known as one of the top carnivores in the aquatic food chain.

== Cause of extinction ==
Starting in the Meiji period, the government of Japan allowed trade with the rest of the world. Animal pelts thus became more valuable since they could be exported. Hunting of Japanese river otters spread throughout the country, and the population was substantially reduced. Populations made a slight comeback after the creation of hunting regulations. Even so, pollution and human development then harmed their environment and resources to build their habitats. This pollution terminated their food sources in the rivers, causing them to hunt in more dangerous settings. These causes grew rapidly, resulting in the extinction of the Japanese river otter in the late twentieth century.

== Search efforts ==
Throughout the 1990s, there were several attempts to locate a surviving Japanese otter.

In December 1991, the Environmental Agency of Japan, in partnership with the Kochi prefectural government, assembled a research team of experts and began their search. In March 1992, the research group found hair and excrement in Kochi Prefecture and believed to have come from an otter. Also found were three footprints, and ten additional excrement samples. After an analysis of a cross-section of the hair, the researchers determined that it came from an otter. An official from the agency's wildlife protection section stated that the hair was "scientifically solid evidence that confirms the existence of the Japanese Otter."

In 1994, zoological experts visited the area where the excrement was found. They discovered remains of the animal's urine, which the animal is believed to leave during its courtship. The prefectural government of Kochi set up an infrared camera for six months from October 1994 to April 1995 in an effort to capture it on film, but all that was recorded were animals such as raccoon dogs.

Between March 4 and 9, 1996, a group of zoo officials, municipal government officials and animal lovers from across the country searched for the river otter in the areas where finds had been made in the past. Such areas included coastal areas in Susaki, areas along the Niyodo River running through Sakawacho and Inocho, and coastal areas along the Shimanto River. No evidence of the animal's existence was found.

Among these, the presumed sighting reported in Kochi by a local artist with a detailed sketch was regarded as "highly trustable" by Yoshihiko Machida, an emeritus professor at Kōchi University in 2009. Dr. Machida also pointed out that the previous studies by the prefecture had been restricted to coastal areas and thus did not fill the definition of extinct species by the IUCN. Regarding this, a survey was conducted by Ehime Prefecture in 2014, noting several recent sightings.

In February 2017, a wild otter was caught on camera on Tsushima Island, Nagasaki Prefecture. However, this individual was later found to represent a Eurasian otter, which have since started to colonize the island, becoming the first otters in Japan in over 38 years.

== Other uses ==
The Japanese otter was used as medicine to help cure tuberculosis. Typically a dosage that would last about 40 days would cost roughly $300 US dollars. Beginning in the early 20th century, the otter pelts were used for military purposes as well. In 1929, the government established the "Hunters Association" which called upon people to hunt and skin these otters, which was one of the main causes of their eventual extinction.

== In culture ==
The Japanese otter was named the official animal symbol of Japan's Ehime Prefecture, a region of Japan in northwestern Shikoku.
