= Lutra hearsti =

Lutra hearsti Temporal range: Piacenzian

Scientific classification
- Kingdom: Animalia
- Phylum: Chordata
- Class: Mammalia
- Infraclass: Placentalia
- Order: Carnivora
- Family: Mustelidae
- Genus: Lutra
- Species: L. hearsti

Binomial name
- Lutra hearsti Geraads et al., 2015

Extinct species of otter

Lutra hearsti is an extinct species of Lutra that lived during the Pliocene epoch.

== Distribution ==
Lutra hearsti fossils have been discovered in the Hadar Formation of Ethiopia.
