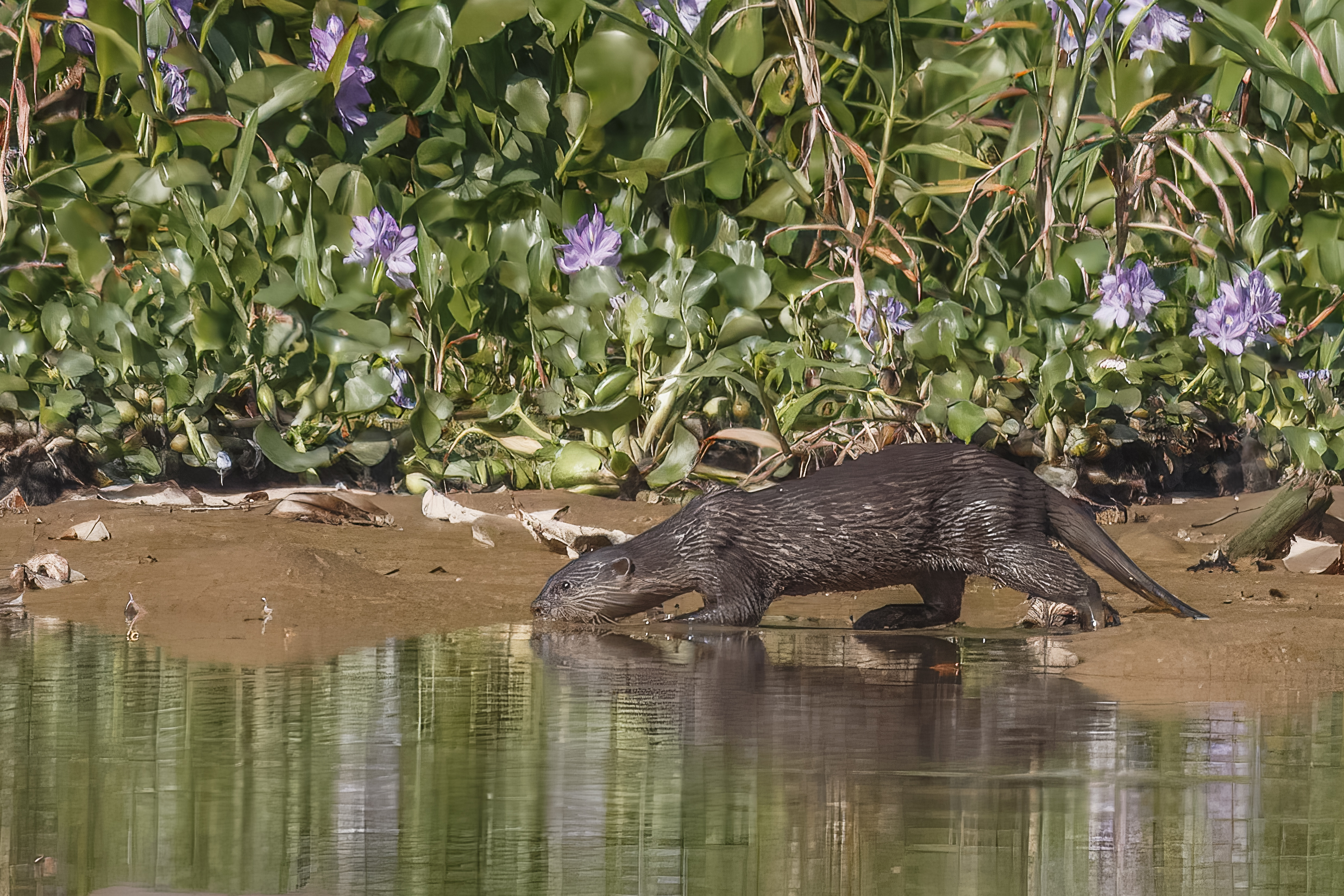
- In Borneo, Malaysia

Conservation status
- Vulnerable (IUCN 3.1)
- CITES Appendix I

Scientific classification
- Kingdom: Animalia
- Phylum: Chordata
- Class: Mammalia
- Order: Carnivora
- Family: Mustelidae
- Genus: Lutra
- Subgenus: Lutrogale
- Species: L. perspicillata

Binomial name
- Lutra perspicillata I. Geoffroy Saint-Hilaire, 1826
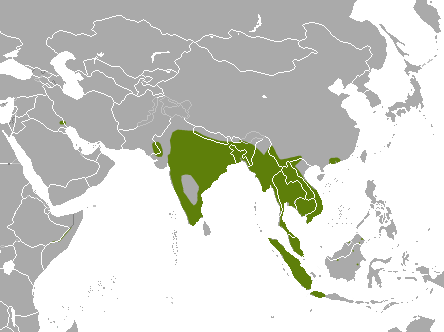
- Smooth-coated otter range

Synonyms
- Lutrogale perspicillata

= Smooth-coated otter =

Species of carnivore

The smooth-coated otter (Lutra perspicillata) is a freshwater otter species from regions of South and Southeast Asia, with a disjunct population in Iraq, with the majority of its numbers found in Southeast Asia. It has been ranked as vulnerable on the IUCN Red List since 1996, as it is threatened by habitat loss, pollution of wetlands and poaching for the illegal wildlife trade. As the common name indicates, its fur is relatively smooth, and somewhat shorter in length than that of other otter species.

== Characteristics ==
The smooth-coated otter has a short, sleek coat of dark-brown to reddish-brown fur along its back, with lighter grayish brown on its underside. It is distinguished from other otter species by a more "rounded" head, and by having a vaguely diamond-shaped, hairless nose. The tail is flattened, in contrast to the more rounded or cylindrical tails of other otters. The legs are short and strong, with large, webbed feet bearing strong and sharp claws for handling slippery fish. The smooth-coated otter is a relatively large otter species, weighing from 7–11 kg (15–24 lb) and measuring around 59–64 cm (23–25 in) in head-body length with a 37–43 cm (15–17 in) long tail. Females have two pairs of teats with which they nurse small litters of several young.

== Taxonomy ==
Lutra perspicillata was the scientific name proposed by Isidore Geoffroy Saint-Hilaire in 1826 for a "brown" otter collected in Sumatra. Lutrogale was proposed as the generic name by John Edward Gray in 1865 for otters with a more convex forehead and nose, using perspicillata as the type species. By the 19th and 20th centuries, several early zoological specimens were described, including:

- Lutrogale perspicillata sindica — proposed by Reginald Innes Pocock in 1940, when seven pale skins of smooth-coated otters were collected and documented in Sukkur and Khairpur Districts of Sindh Province, Pakistan.
- Lutrogale perspicillata maxwelli — proposed by Robert William Hayman in 1957, and named after British naturalist and author Gavin Maxwell, after a dark-brown, adult male smooth-coated otter was collected on the banks of the Tigris River, Iraq.

The smooth-coated otter is the only living species in the monotypic genus Lutrogale. Three regional subspecies are currently recognised:

- L. p. perspicillata — occurs across India, Nepal, southwestern Yunnan, most of mainland Indochina and Southeast Asia, as well as on Sumatra and Java, Indonesia.
- L. p. sindica — occurs in Khyber Pakhtunkhwa, Punjab and Sindh Provinces, Pakistan.
- L. p. maxwelli — occurs in Iraq, primarily near the Tigris River.

The smooth-coated otter, together with the Asian small-clawed otter and the African clawless otter, form a sister clade to the genus Lutra. The smooth-coated otter and the Asian small-clawed otter genetically diverged about 1.33 ± 0.78 million years ago. Hybridisation of smooth-coated otter males with Asian small-clawed otter females has occurred in Singapore. The resulting offspring and their descendants then bred back into the smooth-coated otter population, but maintained the genes of their small-clawed otter ancestors. Today, an urban population of at least 60 hybrid otters exists in Singapore.

== Distribution and habitat ==
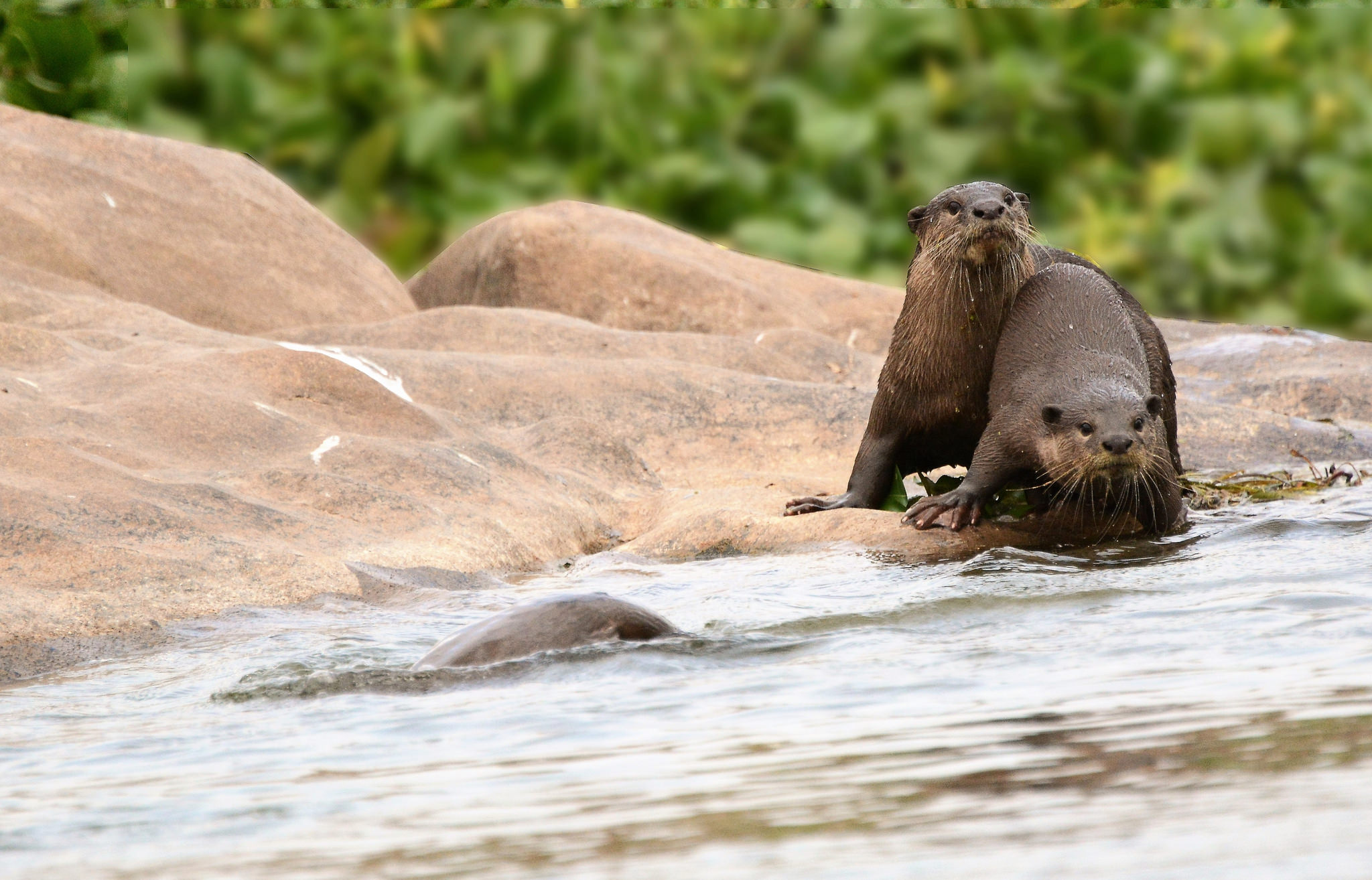
Smooth-coated otters at Tungabhadra River bank, Hampi, Karnataka, India

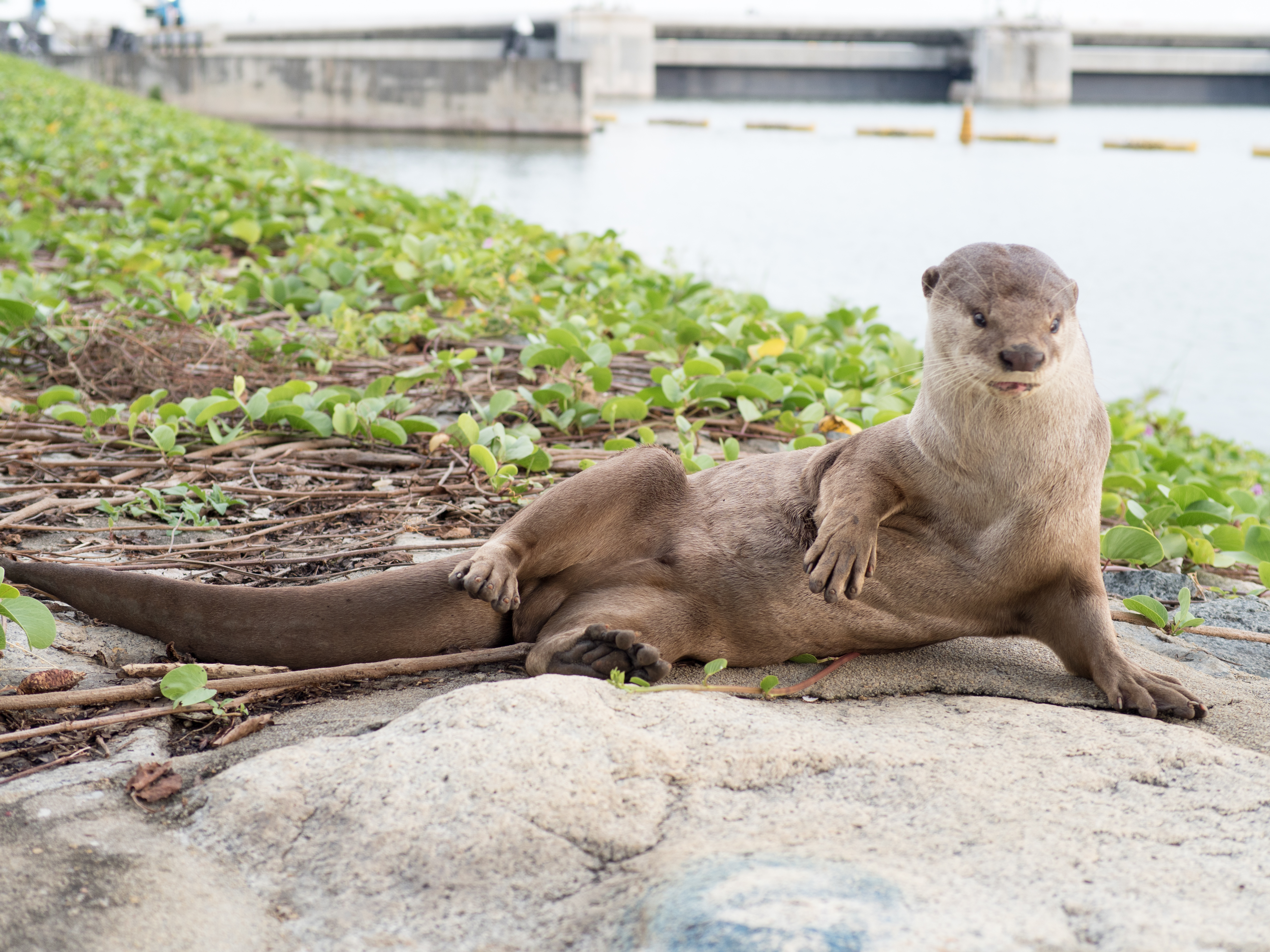
Smooth-coated otter in Singapore

The smooth-coated otter is distributed in Pakistan, India, Nepal, Bhutan, Bangladesh, southern China, Myanmar, Thailand, Cambodia, Vietnam, Peninsular Malaysia, Singapore, and on Borneo, Sumatra and Java. An isolated population lives in the marshes of Iraq. It has often been recorded in saltwater near the coast, especially on smaller islands, but requires a nearby source of freshwater. It inhabits areas where fresh water is plentiful such as wetlands, seasonal swamps, rivers, lakes and rice paddies. Where it is the only occurring otter species, it lives in almost any suitable habitat. But where it is sympatric with other otter species, it avoids smaller streams and canals in favour of larger water bodies. Smooth-coated otter groups studied in the Moyar River preferred rocky areas near fast flowing river segments with loose sand and little vegetation cover.

The population in the Mesopotamian Marshes was feared to have perished, but otter tracks were found in 2009, suggesting the population may have survived. Skins of smooth-coated otters were found during surveys between 2005 and 2012 in the vicinity of Hammar and Hawizeh Marshes. Tracks and scat found in Erbil Province were also thought to have been left by smooth-coated otters.

In Gujarat, smooth-coated otters were documented near lakes, canals and mangroves in the outskirts of Surat in 2015. In Singapore, smooth-coated otters have adapted well to urban environments, and have been observed to use urban structures like gaps under buildings as alternatives for holts. They also use staircases and ladders to get in and out of concrete canals with vertical or near‐vertical banks. This population is well-protected and steadily increasing, with some families, such as the Bishan otter family, becoming a common sight and attracting media attention.

== Behaviour and ecology ==
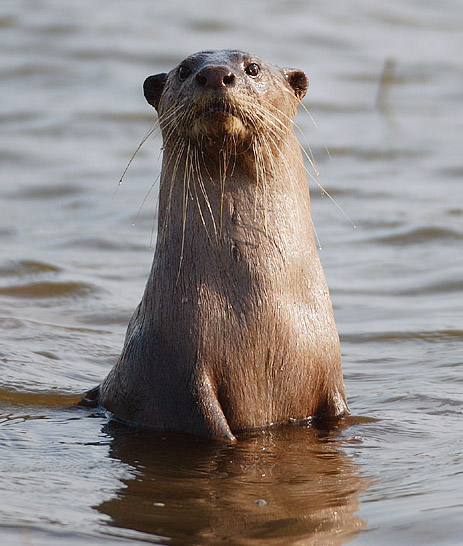
Smooth-coated otter in Kabini River, India

The smooth-coated otter lives in groups of up to 11 individuals. They rest on sandy riverbanks and establish their dens under tree roots or among boulders. Observations in Peninsular Malaysia indicate that they are active foremost during the day, with a short rest during midday. They mark their playground by urinating and sprainting on rocks or vegetation.

They communicate through vocalisations such as whistles, chirps, and wails.

=== Diet ===
Smooth-coated otters were observed to forage on river banks among tree trunks. They feed mainly on fish including Trichogaster, climbing gourami and catfish. During the rice planting season, they also hunt rats in rice fields. Snakes, amphibians and insects constitute a small portion of their diet. Especially in areas where they share habitat with other otter species, they prefer larger fish, typically between 5 and 30 cm (2.0 and 11.8 in) in length.

In Kuala Selangor Nature Park, an otter group was observed hunting. They formed an undulating, slightly V-shaped line, pointing in the direction of movement and nearly as wide as the creek. The largest individuals occupied the middle section. In this formation, they undulated wildly through the creek, causing panic‑stricken fish to jump out of the water a few metres ahead. They suddenly dived and grasped the fish with their snouts. Then they moved ashore, tossed the fish up a little on the muddy part of the bank, and swallowed it head‑first in one piece.

In traditional brackish-water agroecosystems known as "Khazan lands" in Goa's Zuari River estuary, analysis of 815 spraint samples revealed a diet dominated by fish, followed by shrimp, crabs, molluscs, birds and amphibians, with greater reliance on crustaceans during monsoon to adapt to changing salinity and prey availability.

=== Reproduction ===
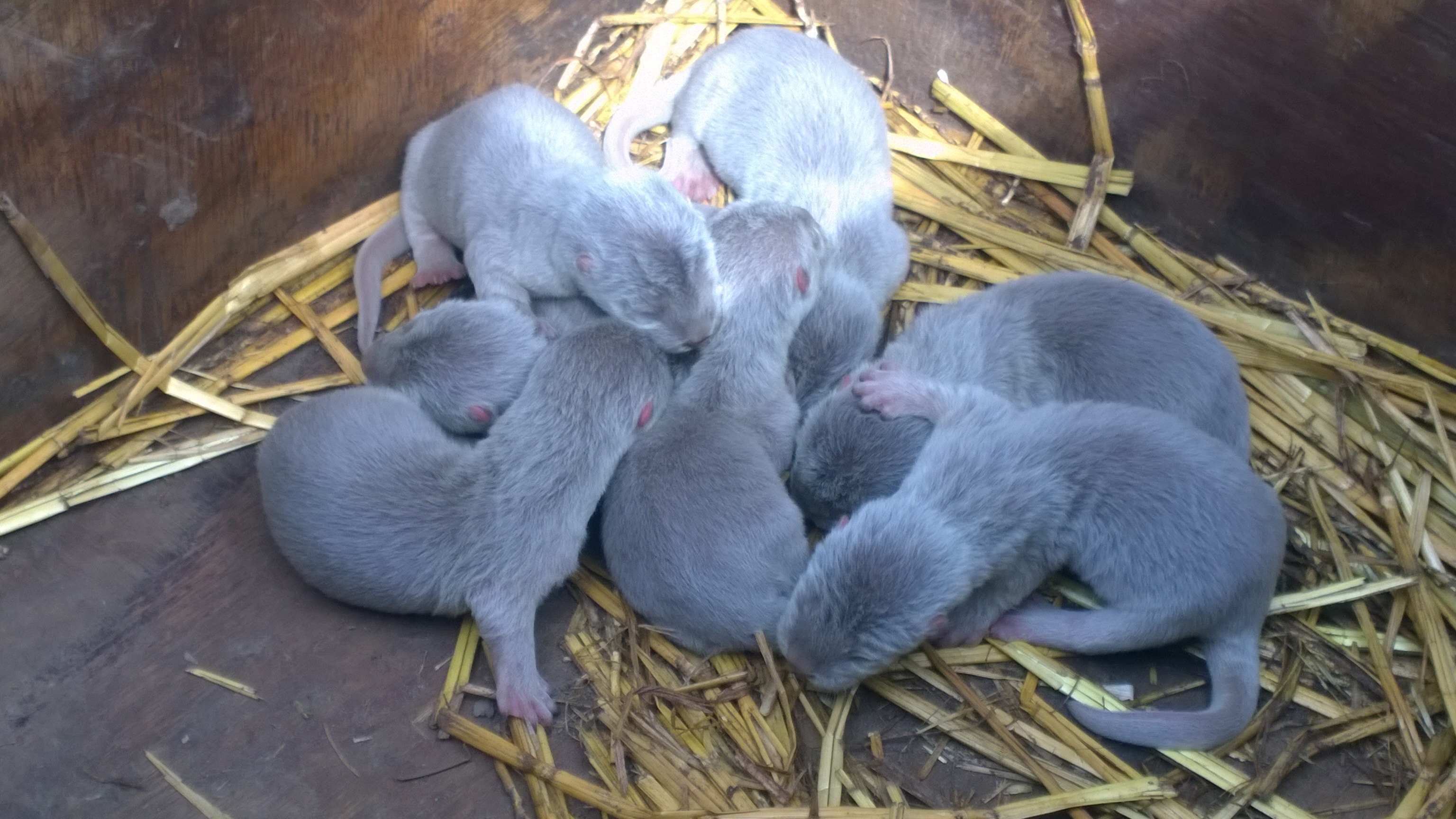
Smooth-coated otter young at Wingham Wildlife Park, England

Smooth-coated otter calling

Smooth-coated otters form small family groups of a mated pair with up to four offspring from previous seasons. Copulation occurs in water and lasts less than one minute.

As long as the food supply is sufficient, they breed throughout the year, but where they depend on monsoon precipitation, they breed between October and February. The largest recorded wild-born litter of seven pups was observed in Singapore in November 2017. Pups are born after a gestation period of 60 to 63 days, with a usual litter size of up to five pups. The mothers give birth to and raise their young in a burrow near water. They either construct such a burrow themselves, or they take over an abandoned one. At birth, the pups are blind and helpless, but their eyes open after 10 days. They are weaned at about three to five months and reach adult size at about one year of age, and sexual maturity at two or three years.

== Threats ==
The smooth-coated otter is threatened by poaching, loss and destruction of wetlands, as these are converted for settlements, agriculture and hydroelectric projects; water courses are being polluted by pesticides such as chlorinated hydrocarbons and organophosphates. These factors lead to a reduced prey base. Otters are indiscriminately killed especially at aquaculture sites. Trapping of otters is prevalent in India, Nepal, and Bangladesh.

Along the Chambal River in India, smooth-coated otters are most vulnerable during winter when they rear young. During this season, they are disturbed by humans harvesting crops and removing wood along rocky stretches of the river.

Six juvenile smooth-coated otters were discovered in a bag left at Bangkok International Airport in January 2013. This was the first case of smooth-coated otters thought to have been destined for the illegal pet trade. At least seven smooth-coated otters were offered for sale through websites by traders in Thailand and Malaysia between 2016 and 2017.

== Conservation ==
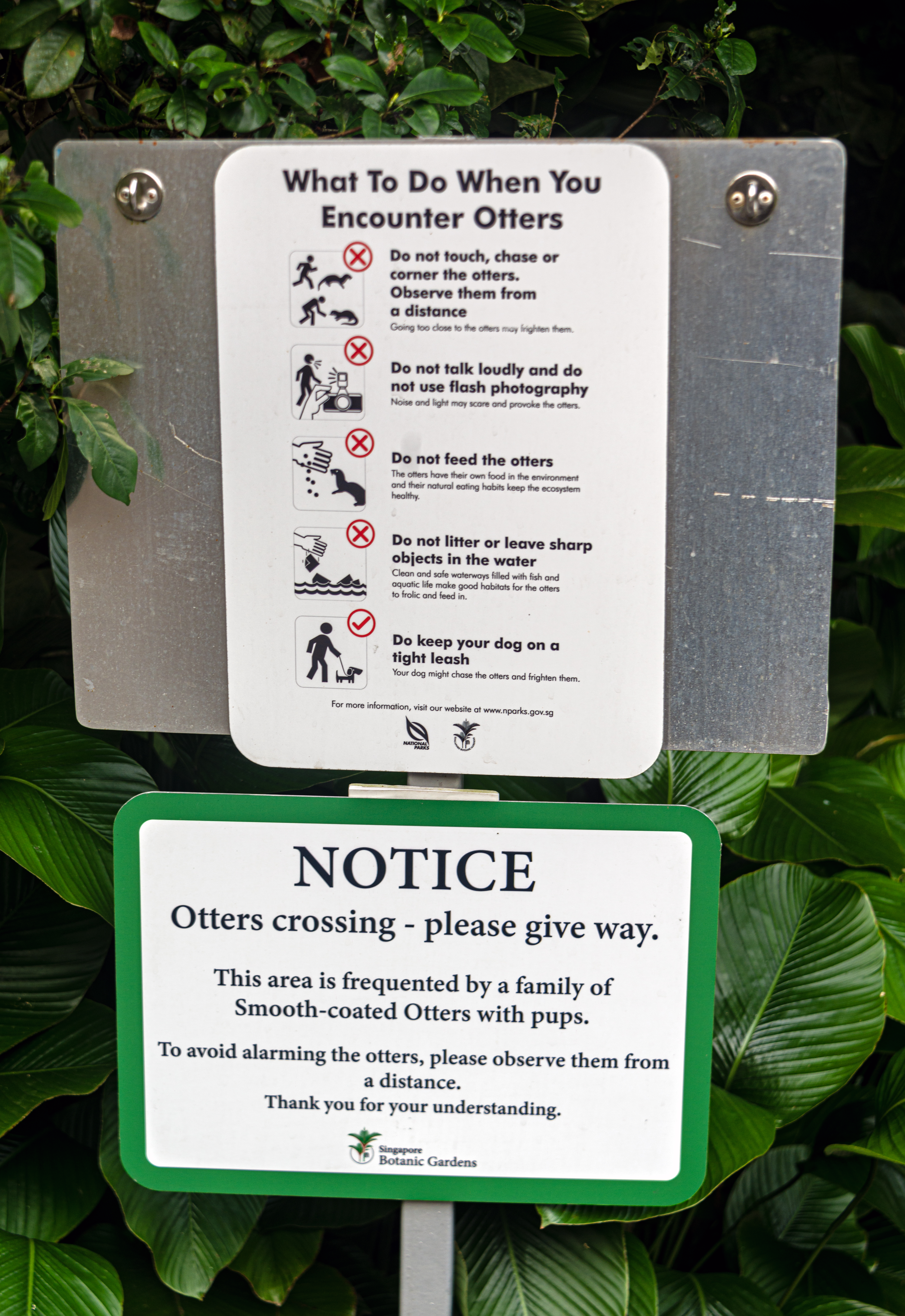
Sign at Singapore Botanic Gardens warning visitors about local otter population

The smooth-coated otter is a protected species in most range countries and listed globally as a vulnerable species. It had been listed on CITES Appendix II since 1977. Since August 2019, it is included in CITES Appendix I, thus strengthening its protection in regards to international trade.

== Cultural significance ==
In southern Bangladesh, smooth-coated otters are used for commercial fishing. They are bred in captivity and trained to chase fish into fishing nets. By 2011, this fishing technique was used by about 300 fishermen, with an additional 2,000 people indirectly dependent on the technique for their livelihood.
