= Khan-Tengiri Nature Park =

National park in Ak-Su District, Issyk-Kul Region, Kyrgyzstan

- Kyrgyz: Хан-Теңири мамлекеттик жаратылыш паркы
- IUCN category II (national park)
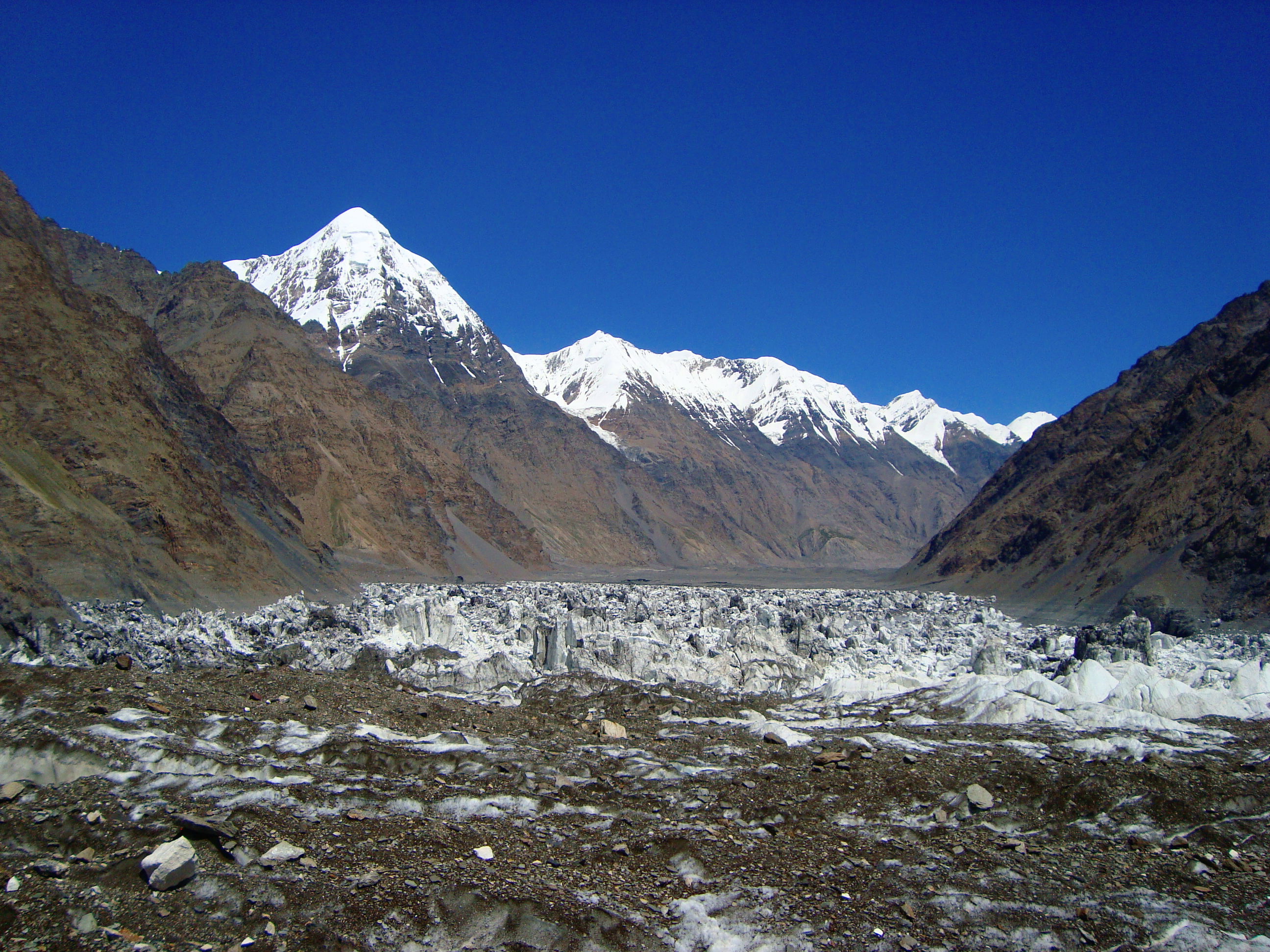
- Merzbacher Lake after Outburst

- Location within Kyrgyzstan
- Location: Ak-Suu District, Issyk-Kul Region, Kyrgyzstan
- Coordinates: 42°10′N 79°55′E
- Area: 2,758.003 km^{2} (1,064.871 sq mi)
- Established: 2016
- Website: www.facebook.com/khanteniri/

Khan-Tengiri Nature Park (Kyrgyz: Хан-Теңири мамлекеттик жаратылыш паркы) is a national park in Ak-Suu District of Issyk-Kul Region of Kyrgyzstan established in February 2016. It covers 2,758.003 km^{2} (1,064.871 sq mi). The purpose of the park is conservation of the unique nature complex and biodiversity, protection of rare and endangered species of flora and fauna, and extension of the network of specially protected areas of Kyrgyz Republic. The park is located in the easternmost part of Kyrgyzstan between mountain ranges Terskey Ala-Too and Kakshaal Too. The nature park is largely within Saryjaz river basin.

The nature park takes its name from the mountain Khan Tengri, one of the most beautiful peaks in the world, rising to 6995 meters above sea level.

This is one of the few places where the endangered snow leopard lives. In the period from 2018 to 2019, 14 adults and 5 cubs of a snow leopard were recorded in the park.
