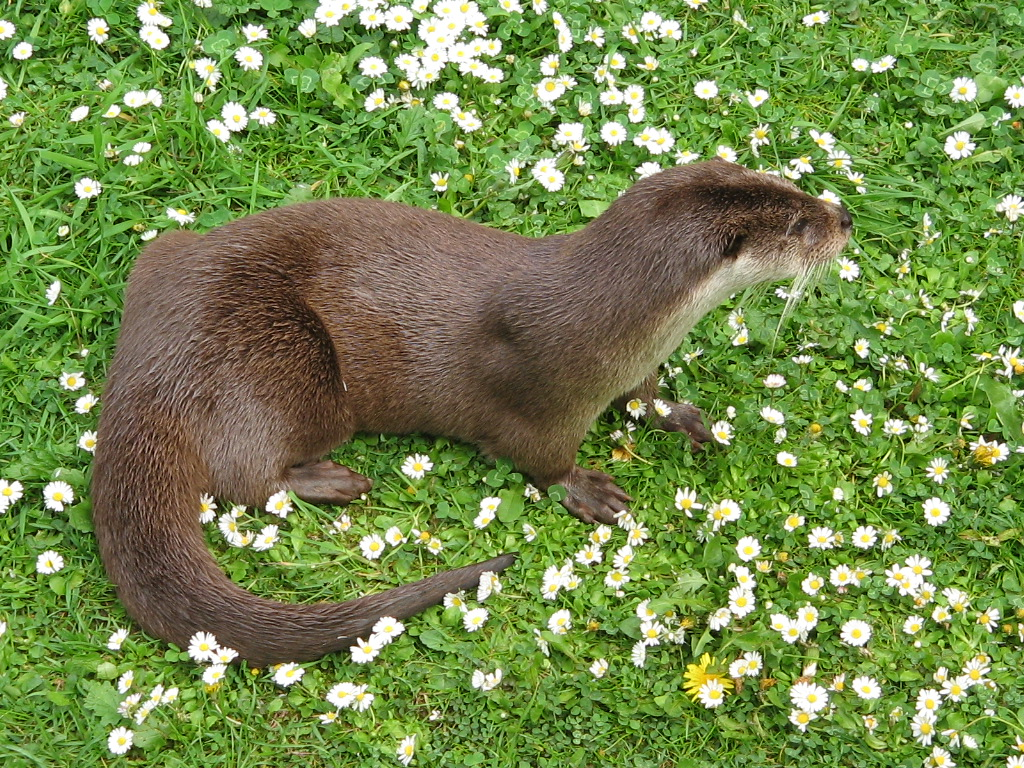
- Eurasian otter (Lutra lutra)

Scientific classification
- Kingdom: Animalia
- Phylum: Chordata
- Class: Mammalia
- Infraclass: Placentalia
- Order: Carnivora
- Family: Mustelidae
- Subfamily: Lutrinae
- Genus: Lutra; Brisson, 1762

Type species
- Mustela lutra Linnaeus, 1758

Subgenera
- Aonyx; Amblonyx; Lutra; Lutrogale

= Lutra =

Genus of carnivores

Lutra is a genus of otters.

== Taxonomy and phylogeny ==
A 2022 study proposed treating the genera Aonyx, Amblonyx, and Lutrogale as synonyms of Lutra in order to simplify the classification of the subfamily Lutrinae and align them with the New World otter genus Lontra in terms of divergence times and morphological diversity. This proposal has been adopted by the Mammal Diversity Database.

The classification of extant species and species that have gone extinct since 1500 is presented.

- Subgenus Aonyx
  - African clawless otter, Lutra capensis
  - Congo clawless otter, Lutra congica
- Subgenus Amblonyx
  - Asian small-clawed otter, Lutra cinerea
- Subgenus Lutra
  - Eurasian otter, Lutra lutra
  - Japanese otter, Lutra nippon
  - Hairy-nosed otter, Lutra sumatrana
- Subgenus Lutrogale
  - Smooth-coated otter, Lutra perspicillata

=== Phylogeny ===
The following phylogenetic tree is based on de Ferran et al. (2022).

- Lutra
  - - Lutra (Lutra)
      - L. lutra
      - L. sumatrana
  - - - Lutra (Lutrogale)
        L. perspicillata
      - Lutra (Amblonyx)
        L. cinerea
    - - Lutra (Aonyx)
        - L. congica
        - L. capensis
