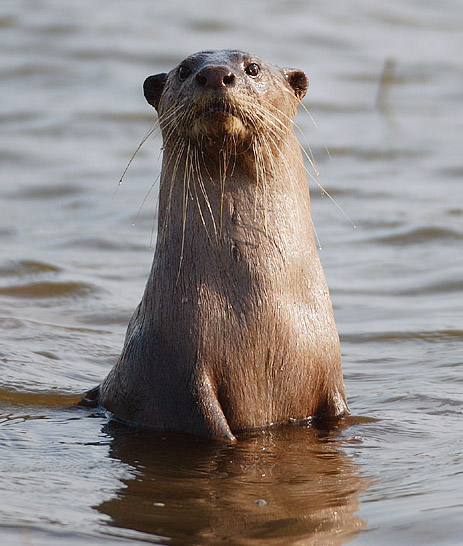
- Smooth-coated otter (Lutrogale perspicillata)

Scientific classification
- Kingdom: Animalia
- Phylum: Chordata
- Class: Mammalia
- Infraclass: Placentalia
- Order: Carnivora
- Family: Mustelidae
- Genus: Lutra
- Subgenus: Lutrogale (Gray, 1865)

Type species
- Lutra perspicillata
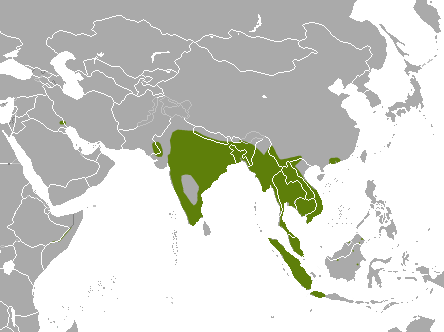
- Distribution of smooth-coated otter

= Lutra (Lutrogale) =

Genus of carnivores

Lutrogale is a subgenus, originally proposed as a genus by John Edward Gray in 1865, for otters with a convex forehead and nose, using the smooth-coated otter L. perspicillata as type species.

The following extinct and fossil species are included:

- L. cretensis – Cretan otter
- L. palaeoleptonyx
- L. robusta
