= Spraint =

Otter dung

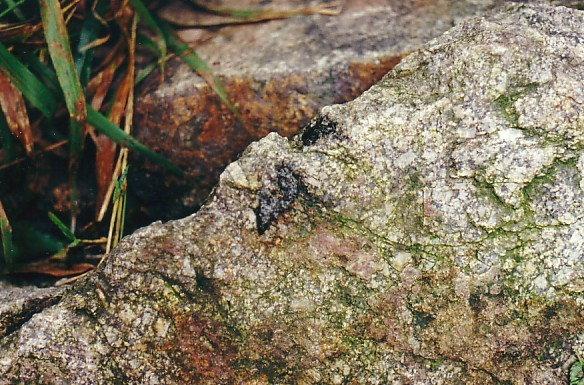
Eurasian otter spraint

Spraint is the dung of the otter. The word is derived from Old French.

Spraints are typically identified by smell and are known for their distinct odors, the smell of which has been described as ranging from freshly mown hay to putrefied fish. The Eurasian otter's spraints are black and slimy, 3–10 cm (1–4 in) long and deposited in groups of up to four in prominent locations near water. They contain scales, shells and bones of water creatures. Because of the decline of otters in Britain, several surveys have been made to record the distribution of the animal, usually by recording the presence of spraint.

== Composition ==
The makeup of spraint, like all feces, consists of what the otter ate. This can be affected by the otter's location, even within one species. In Eurasian otters living in Scotland, eel make up the majority of loch-dwelling otters spraints, especially in summer. In winter, the loch dwellers are more likely to feed on salmon. River-dwelling otters, meanwhile, eat a wider array of fish, as well as amphibians (mostly in the spring) and, occasionally, rabbits (mostly individuals suffering from myxomatosis). In Poland, as much as 54% of spraint biomass may come from frogs. In Iberia, the invasive crayfish Procambrius clarkii is the second most commonly found prey in spraint, after eels. This has led to a theory that otters are more successful at catching eels when they are also eating crayfish.

Spraint frequently has a spinky appearance, caused by the presence of bones, scales, and other undigested material. The digestive system of an otter is short, and the feces are not as complete as those of other animals. Fish and amphibian bones and scales are the most commonly occurring undigested matter in spraint; bird feathers and mammal hairs and bones occur less often. Fish jaws may be seen, usually without their teeth.

Spraint odor varies by species. The spraint of the smooth-coated otter reeks of rotten fish. The spraint of the Eurasian otter, in contrast, has been variously described as "pungent" and "fishy", yet also similar to jasmine tea or newly mown hay. "a delight" and "one of the least offensive smells...of excrement".

Sometimes, a female otter will top her spraint with a jelly-like secretion from its anal glands. This jelly is opaque and white, with a musky scent. This jelly is associated with estrus.

An otter's mitogenome sequence can be recovered from spraint. This has been encouraged as a noninvasive method of collecting otter DNA.

== Abundance ==
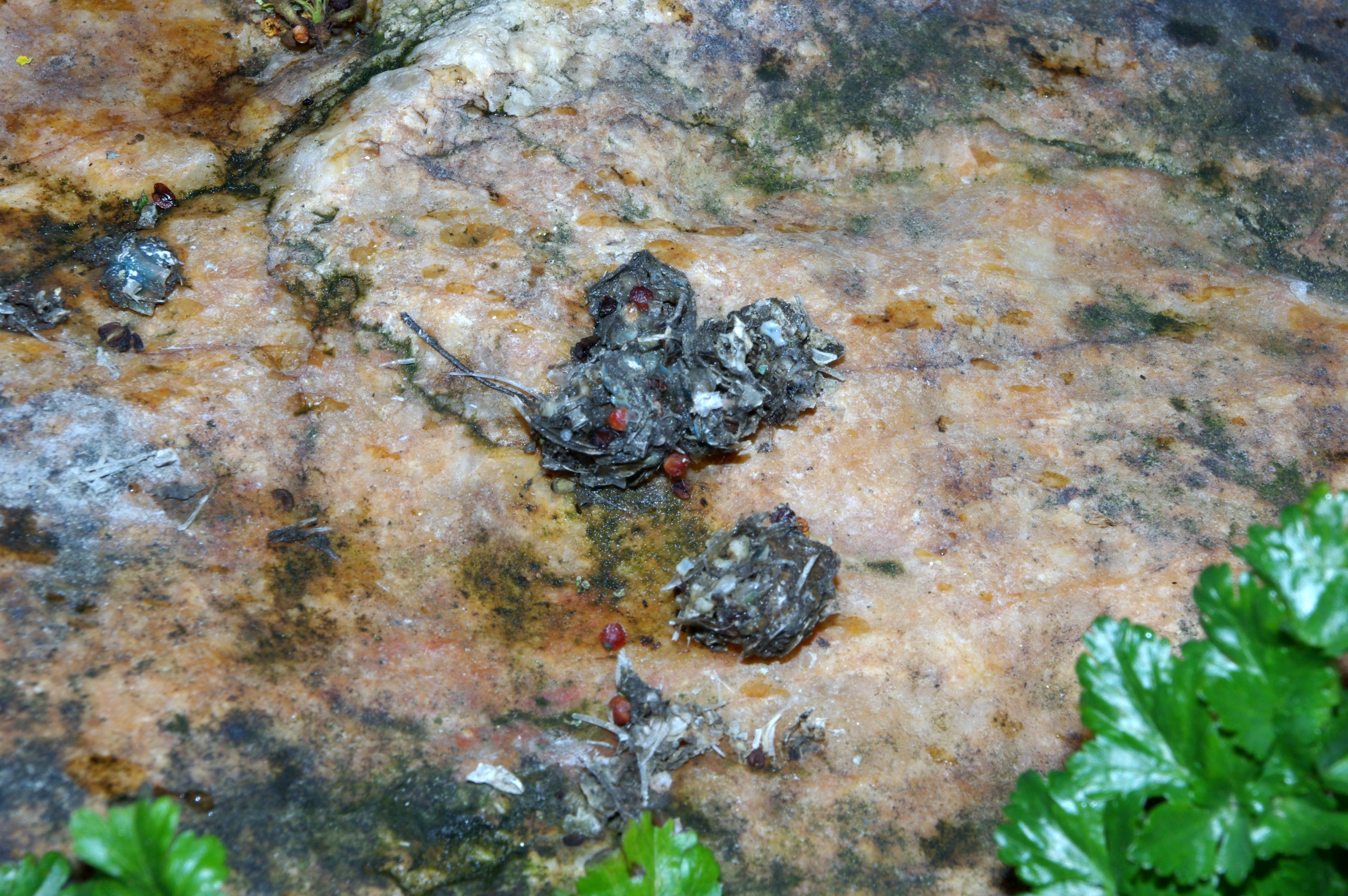
European otter spraint

Otters may leave spraints outside of their holts (dens), or at designated latrines. Natal holts are usually clear of spraint. When not left at holts, spraint is usually left near water. Smooth-coated otters leave spraint on rocks or sandbanks, usually 1 to 3 metres (3.3 to 9.8 ft) above the water. Eurasian otters prefer dense vegetation, as well as on dead trees, beneath bridges, or in sand pits. They may leave spraints on banks, but can also be as many as 50 metres (160 ft) away from the bank.

In Eurasian otters, there is a positive correlation between percentage of spraint around a pool and volume of otter prey present in said pool. In Scotland, spraints are usually seen in the same places year-round, except in the fall, when spraints aggregate in salmon spawning areas.

== Otter behavior and spraints ==
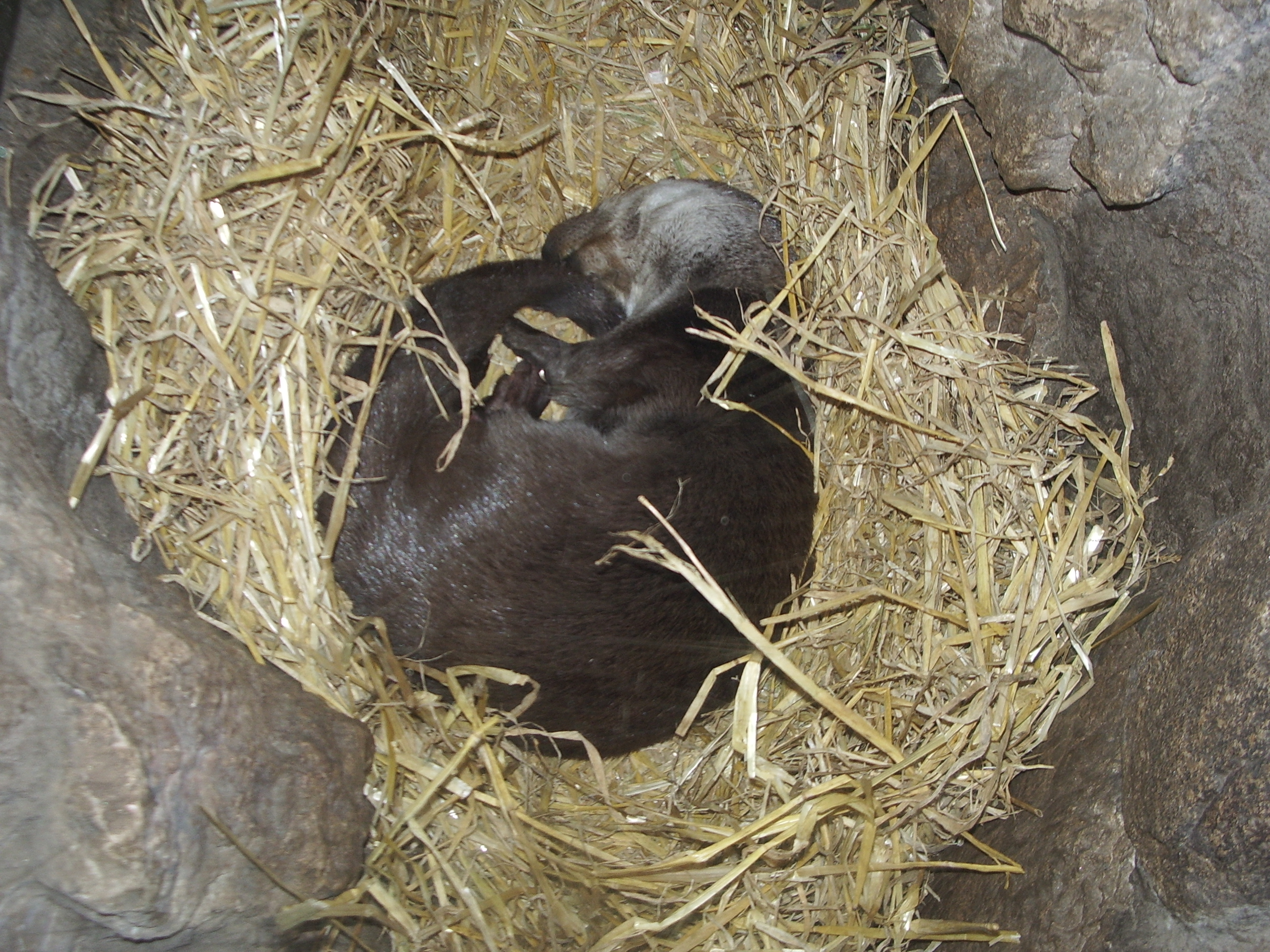
A Eurasian otter in its holt. Holts may be marked with spraint.

Spraints may be used as a form of communication between otters. Spraints are usually within 150 metres (490 ft) of the otter's holt, indicating that spraints are a method of marking territory. Otters regularly patrol their territory, and if a foreign spraint is discovered, the resident otter will more frequently mark and visit that site. Resident otters do not respond much to their removal of their own spraints from their territories.

The smooth-coated otter often rolls in grass after sprainting.

== Effect of human interference ==
Eurasian otters may leave spraints as far as 50 metres (160 ft) from the riverbanks. Human trespassing and cattle grazing within such areas may disturb otters. Some individual otters may be undisturbed by human interference, as otters have been known to leave their spraints on boathouses or busy jetties.

The distribution of otters can be estimated by doing spraint surveys. The absence of spraints may indicate a decline of otters. Spraints can also be tested for toxins, as a way to test whether otters have been exposed to pollutants.
