= List of mammals of Sardinia =

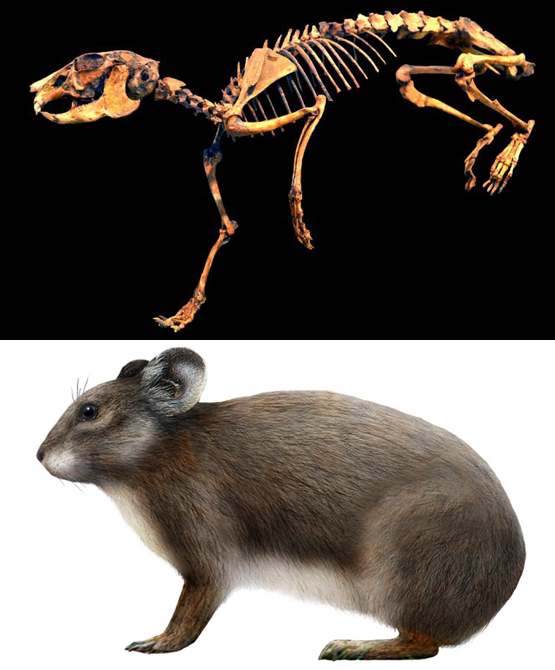
The Sardinian pika, a pika-like lagomorph native to Sardinia, that became extinct sometime in the last 3000 years.

This is a list of the mammal species recorded in Sardinia, Italy. Almost all terrestrial mammals found on the island today have been introduced by humans, replacing a highly endemic fauna present on the island during the Late Pleistocene

The following tags are used to highlight each species' conservation status as assessed by the International Union for Conservation of Nature.

EX	Extinct	No reasonable doubt that the last individual has died.
EW	Extinct in the wild	Known only to survive in captivity or as a naturalized populations well outside its previous range.
CR	Critically endangered	The species is in imminent risk of extinction in the wild.
EN	Endangered	The species is facing an extremely high risk of extinction in the wild.
VU	Vulnerable	The species is facing a high risk of extinction in the wild.
NT	Near threatened	The species does not meet any of the criteria that would categorise it as risking extinction but it is likely to do so in the future.
LC	Least concern	There are no current identifiable risks to the species.
DD	Data deficient	There is inadequate information to make an assessment of the risks to this species.

== Order: Rodentia (rodents) ==
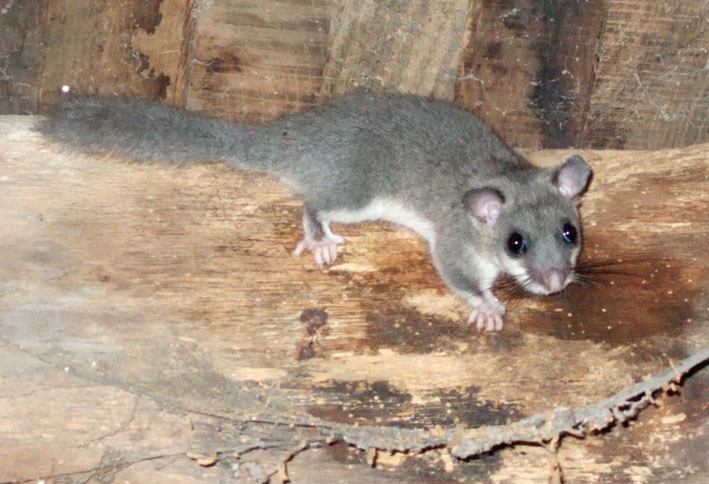
Edible dormouse

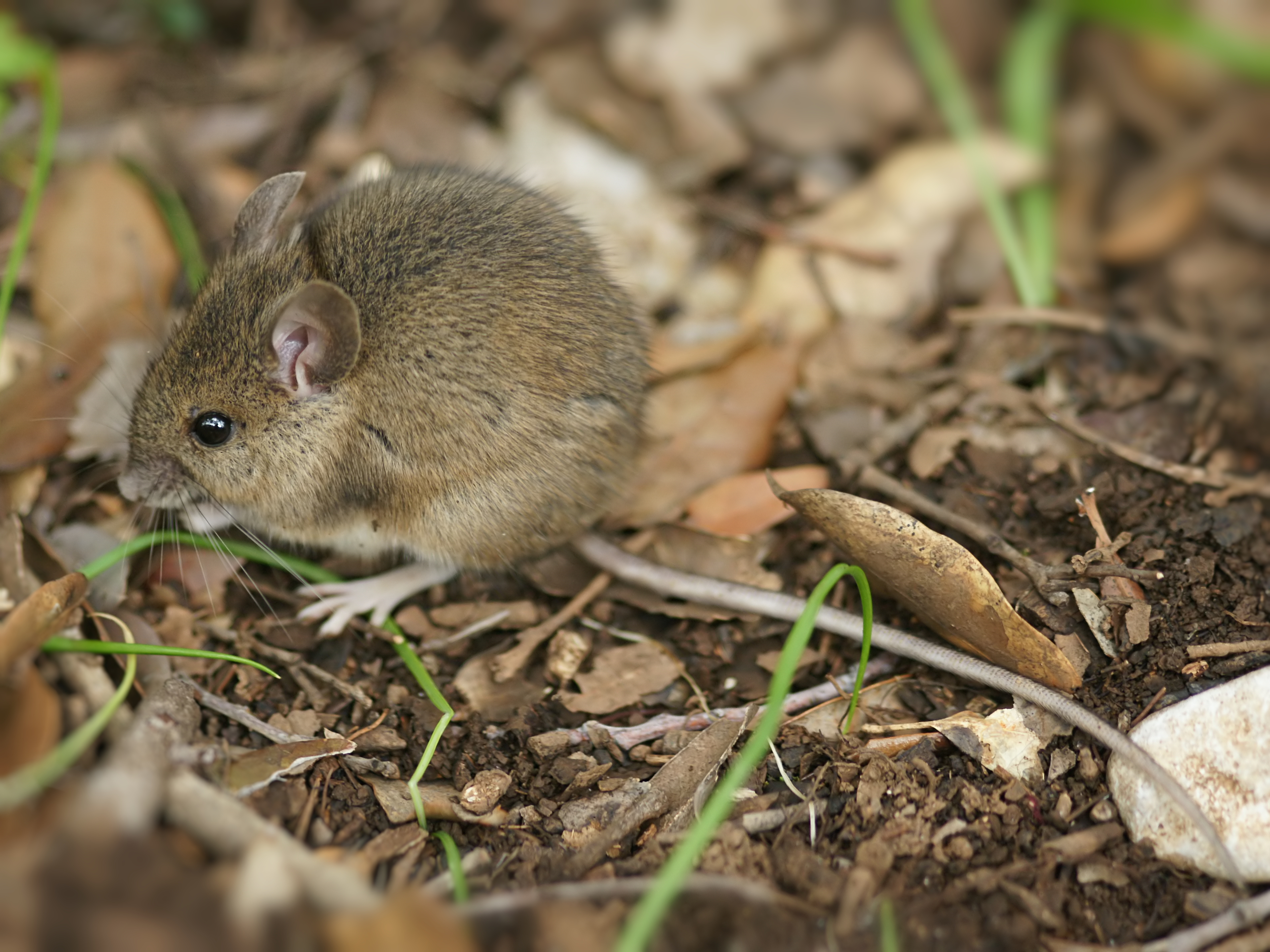
Wood mouse

Rodents make up the largest order of mammals, with over 40% of mammalian species. They have two incisors in the upper and lower jaw which grow continually and must be kept short by gnawing. Most rodents are small though the capybara can weigh up to 45 kg (99 lb).

- Suborder: Hystricomorpha
  - Family: Hystricidae
    - Genus: Hystrix
      - Crested porcupine, H. cristata LC introduced
- Suborder: Sciuromorpha
  - Family: Gliridae (dormice)
    - Subfamily: Glirinae
      - Genus: Glis
        - Edible dormouse, G. glis LC introduced
    - Subfamily: Leithiinae
      - Genus: Eliomys
        - Garden dormouse, E. quercinus LC introduced
  - Family: Muridae (mice and rats)
    - Subfamily: Murinae
      - Genus: Apodemus
        - Wood mouse, A. sylvaticus LC
      - Genus: Mus
        - House mouse, M. musculus LC introduced
      - Genus: Rattus
        - Brown rat, R. norvegicus LC introduced
        - Black rat, R. rattus LC introduced

== Order: Lagomorpha (lagomorphs) ==
The lagomorphs comprise two families, Leporidae and pikas. Though they can resemble rodents, and were classified as a superfamily in that order until the early 20th century, they have since been considered a separate order. They differ from rodents in a number of physical characteristics, such as having four incisors in the upper jaw rather than two.

- Family: Leporidae (rabbits, hares)
  - Genus: Lepus
    - Cape hare, L. capensis LC introduced
  - Genus: Oryctolagus
    - European rabbit, Oryctolagus cuniculus NT introduced

== Order: Eulipotyphla ==
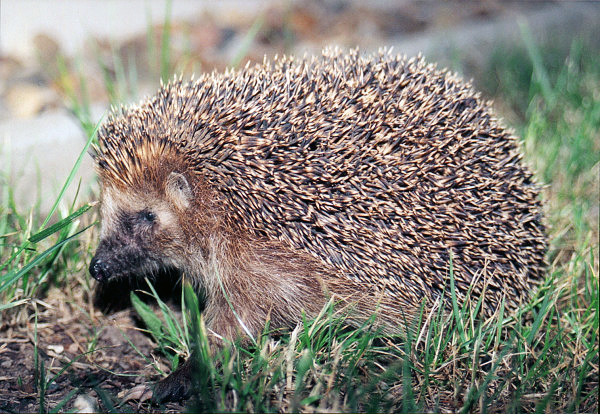
European hedgehog

The order Erinaceomorpha contains a single family, Erinaceidae, which comprise the hedgehogs and gymnures. The hedgehogs are easily recognised by their spines while gymnures look more like large rats.

- Family: Erinaceidae (hedgehogs)
  - Subfamily: Erinaceinae
    - Genus: Erinaceus
      - West European hedgehog, E. europaeus LC introduced

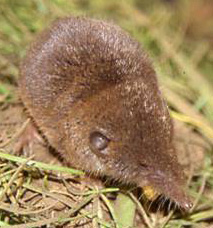
North African white-toothed shrew

- Family: Soricidae (shrews)
  - Subfamily: Crocidurinae
    - Genus: Crocidura
      - North African white-toothed shrew, Crocidura ichnusae DD introduced
    - Genus: Suncus
      - Etruscan shrew, Suncus etruscus LC

== Order: Chiroptera (bats) ==
The bats' most distinguishing feature is that their forelimbs are developed as wings, making them the only mammals capable of flight. Bat species account for about 20% of all mammals.

- Family: Miniopteridae (long-winged bats)
  - Subfamily: Miniopterinae
    - Genus: Miniopterus
      - Common bent-wing bat, M. schreibersii VU
- Family: Molossidae (free-tailed bats)
  - Subfamily: Molossinae
    - Genus: Tadarida
      - European free-tailed bat, T. teniotis LC
- Family: Rhinolophidae (horseshoe bats)
  - Subfamily: Rhinolophinae
    - Genus: Rhinolophus
      - Mediterranean horseshoe bat, R. euryale NT
      - Greater horseshoe bat, R. ferrumequinum LC
      - Lesser horseshoe bat, R. hipposideros LC
      - Mehely's horseshoe bat, R. mehelyi VU
- Family: Vespertilionidae (mouse-eared bats)
  - Subfamily: Myotinae
    - Genus: Myotis
      - Long-fingered bat, Myotis capaccinii VU
      - Daubenton's bat, Myotis daubentonii LC
      - Geoffroy's bat, Myotis emarginatus LC
      - Felten's myotis, Myotis punicus NT
  - Subfamily: Verpertilioninae
    - Genus: Barbastella
      - Barbastelle, Barbastella barbastellus NT
    - Genus: Hypsugo
      - Savi's pipistrelle, Hypsugo savii LC
    - Genus: Plecotus
      - Brown long-eared bat, Plecotus auritus LC
      - Grey long-eared bat, Plecotus austriacus LC
      - Sardinian long-eared bat, Plecotus sardus VU
    - Genus: Pipistrellus
      - Kuhl's pipistrelle, Pipistrellus kuhlii LC
      - Nathusius's pipistrelle, Pipistrellus nathusii LC
      - Common pipistrelle, Pipistrellus pipistrellus LC

== Order: Cetacea (whales) ==
The order Cetacea includes whales, dolphins and porpoises. They are the mammals most fully adapted to aquatic life with a spindle-shaped nearly hairless body, protected by a thick layer of blubber, and forelimbs and tail modified to provide propulsion underwater.

- Suborder: Mysticeti
  - Family: Balaenopteridae (rorquals)
    - Genus: Balaenoptera
      - Common minke whale, Balaenoptera acutorostrata LC
      - Fin whale, Balaenoptera physalus VU
- Suborder: Odontoceti
  - Family: Delphinidae (dolphins and pilot whales)
    - Genus: Delphinus
      - Short-beaked common dolphin, Delphinus delphis EN
    - Genus: Tursiops
      - Common bottlenose dolphin, Tursiops truncatus VU
    - Genus: Stenella
      - Striped dolphin, Stenella coeruleoalba VU
    - Genus: Steno
      - Rough-toothed dolphin, Steno bredanensis LC
    - Genus: Grampus
      - Risso's dolphin, Grampus griseus DD
    - Genus: Globicephala
      - Long-finned pilot whale, Globicephala melas DD
    - Genus: Orcinus
      - Killer whale, Orcinus orca DD
  - Family: Physeteridae (sperm whales)
    - Genus: Physeter
      - Sperm whale, Physeter macrocephalus EN
  - Family: Ziphiidae (beaked whales)
    - Genus: Ziphius
      - Cuvier's beaked whale, Ziphius cavirostris VU

== Order: Carnivora (carnivorans) ==
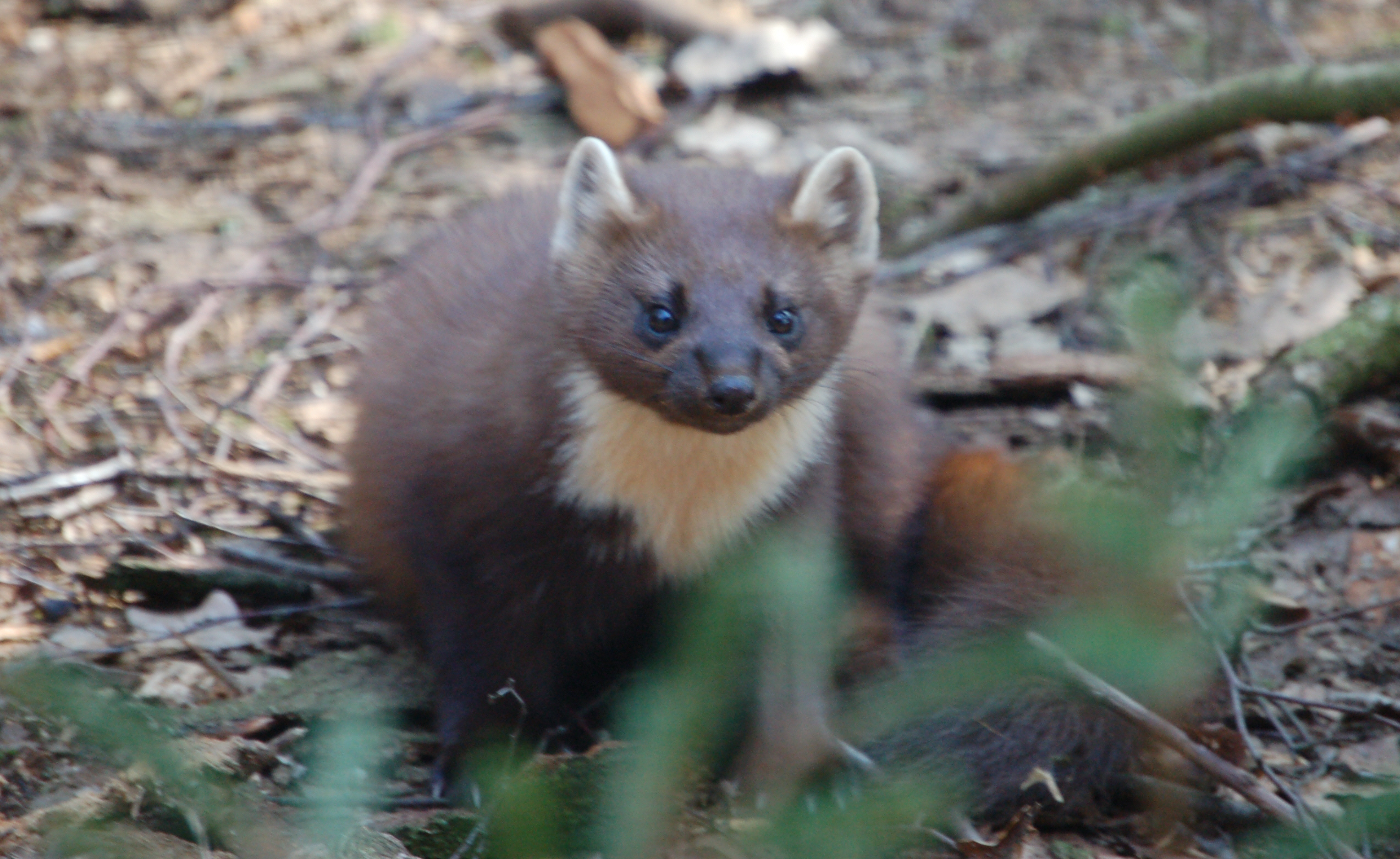
European pine marten

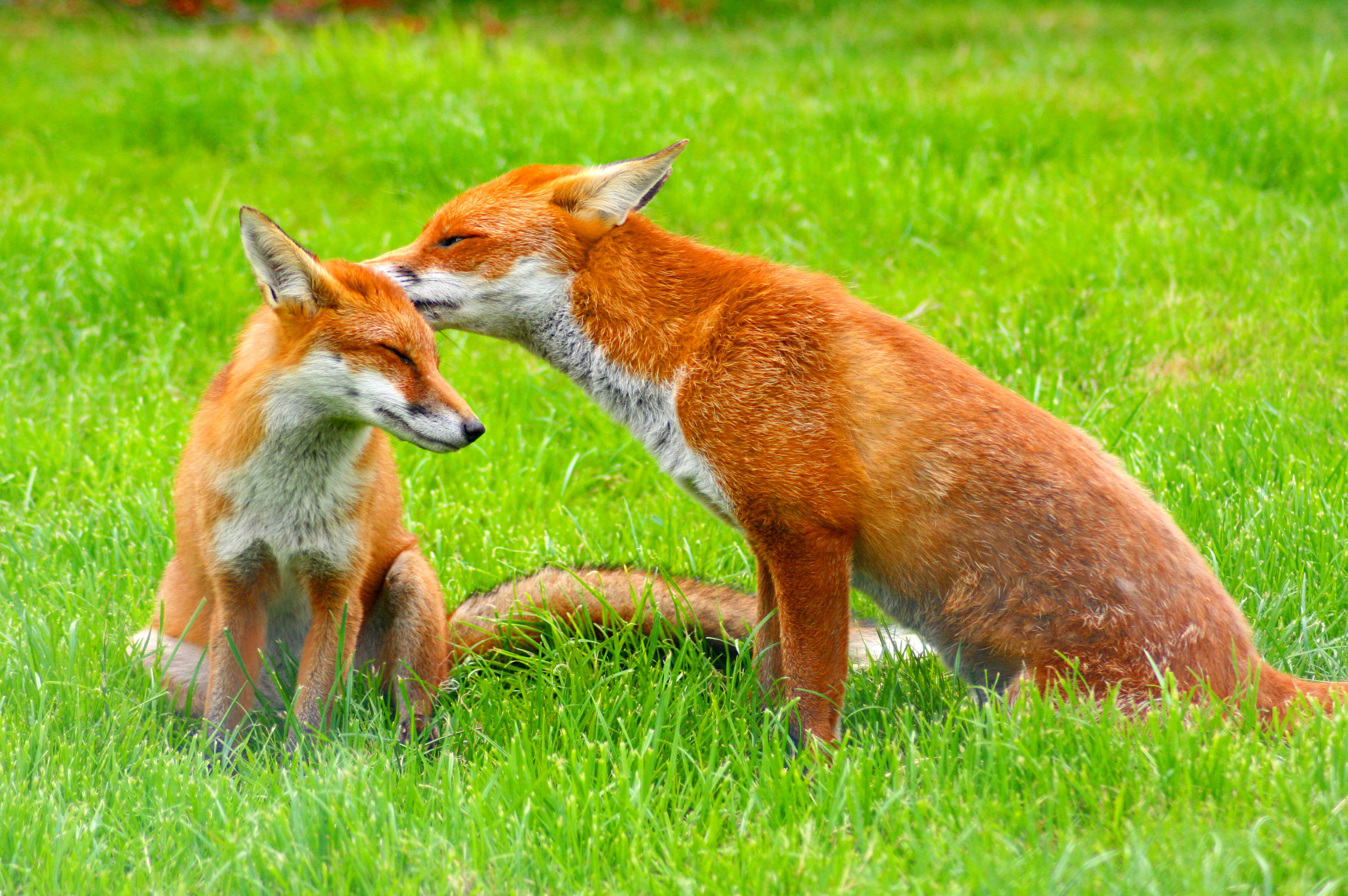
Red foxes

There are over 260 species of carnivorans, the majority of which feed primarily on meat. They have a characteristic skull shape and dentition.

- Suborder: Caniformia
  - Family: Canidae (dogs, foxes, wolves)
    - Genus: Vulpes
      - Red fox, V. vulpes LC
  - Family: Mustelidae (weasels)
    - Genus: Martes
      - European pine marten, M. martes LC
    - Genus: Mustela
      - Least weasel, M. nivalis LC
- Family: Phocidae (earless seals)
  - Genus: Monachus
    - Mediterranean monk seal, M. monachus EN possibly extirpated

== Order: Artiodactyla (even-toed ungulates) ==
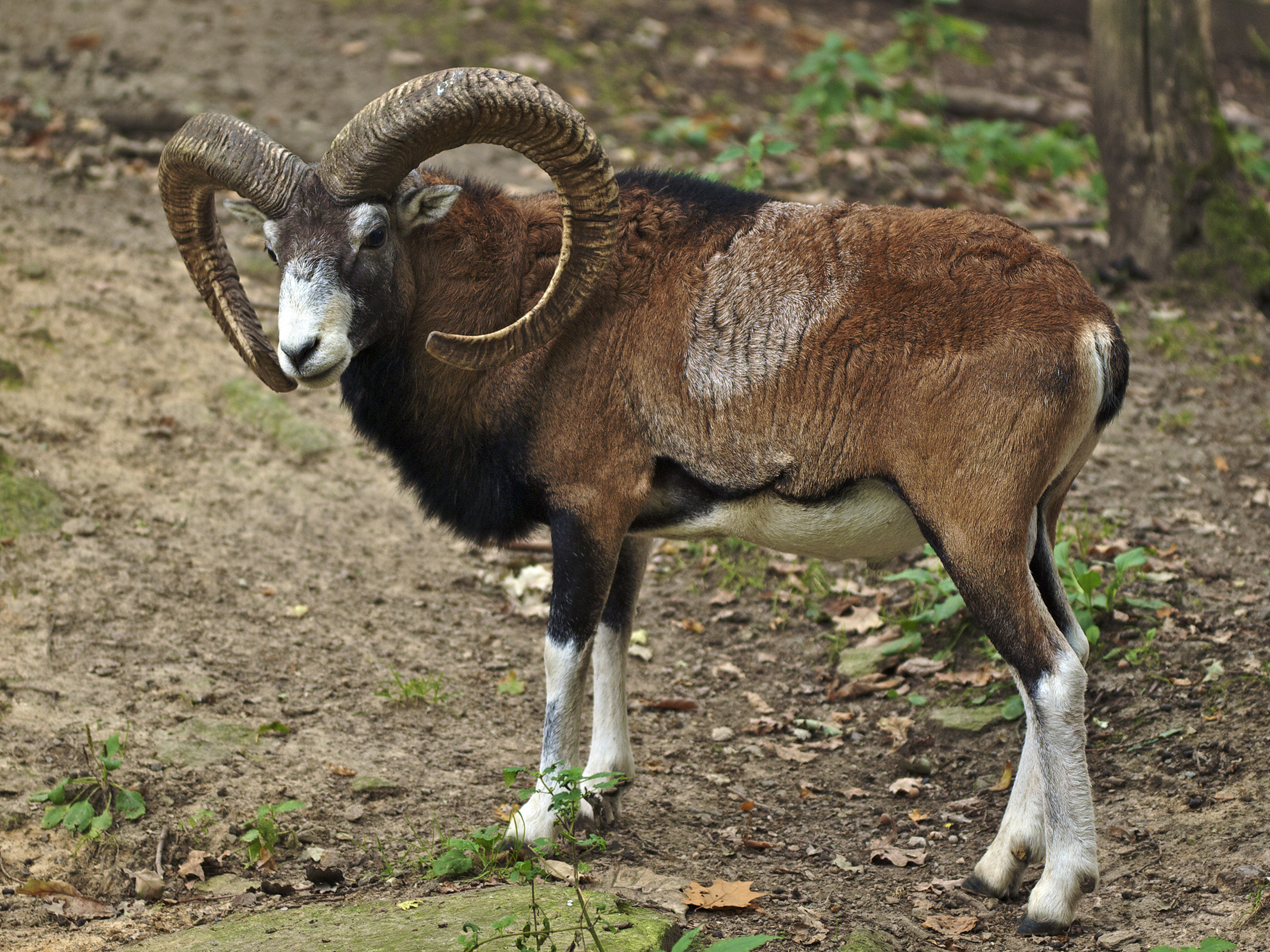
Mouflon

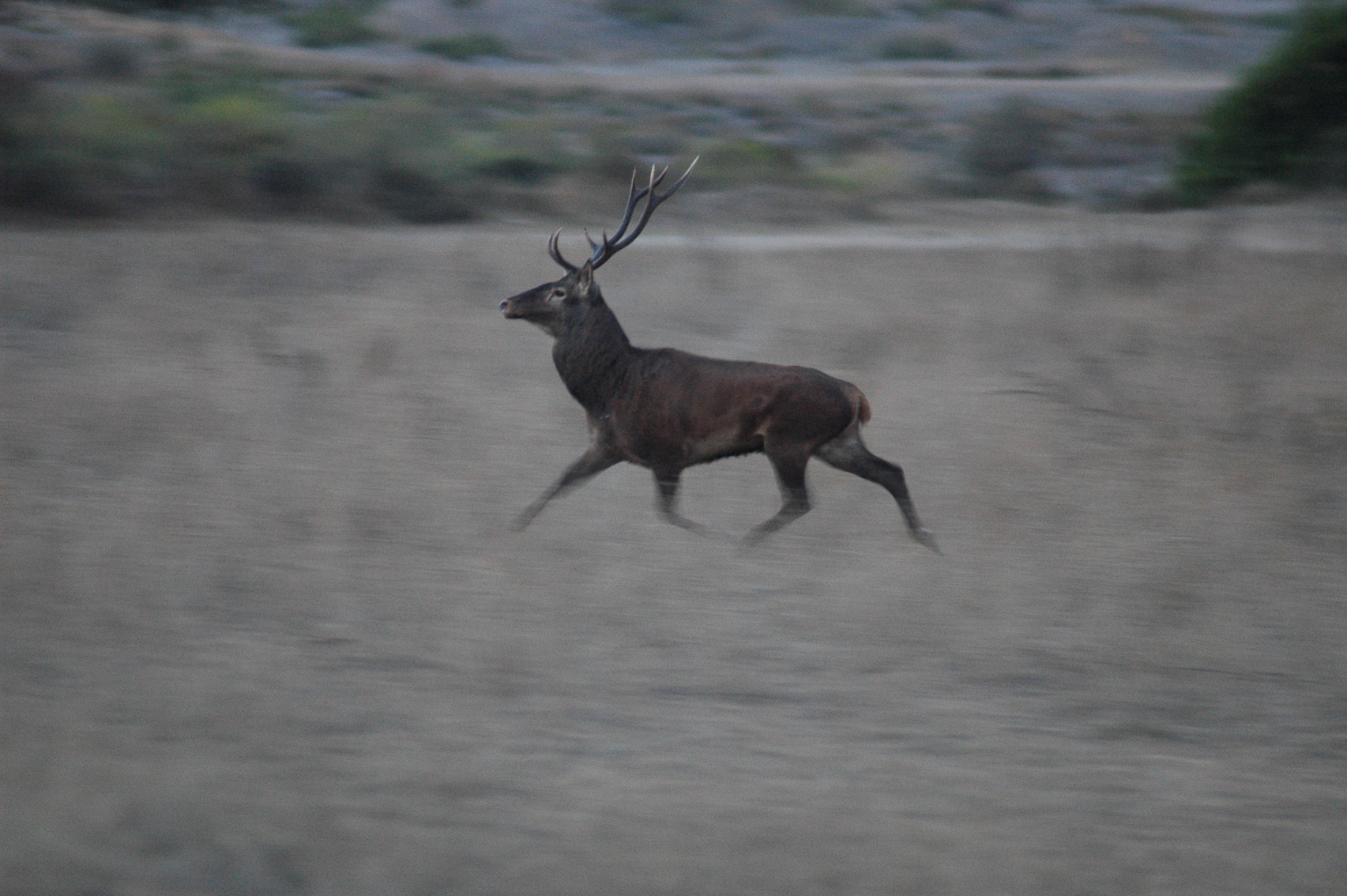
Corsican red deer

The even-toed ungulates are ungulates whose weight is borne about equally by the third and fourth toes, rather than mostly or entirely by the third as in perissodactyls. There are about 220 artiodactyl species, including many that are of great economic importance to humans.

- Family: Suidae (pigs)
  - Subfamily: Suinae
    - Genus: Sus
      - Wild boar, S. scrofa LC introduced
- Family: Cervidae (deer)
  - Subfamily: Cervinae
    - Genus: Cervus
      - Red deer, C. elaphus LC
        - Corsican red deer, C. e. corsicanus introduced
    - Genus: Dama
      - Fallow deer, D. dama LC introduced

== Extinct mammals ==
=== Order: Proboscidea (elephants and kin) ===
- Family: Elephantidae
  - Genus: †Mammuthus (mammoths)
    - Species: †Mammuthus lamarmorai [[Mammuthus lamarmorai|EX]]

=== Order: Rodentia (rodents) ===
- Suborder: Sciuromorpha
  - Family: Muridae (mice and rats)
    - Subfamily: Murinae
      - Genus †Rhagamys
        - †Tyrrhenian field rat, R. orthodon EX
  - Family: Cricetidae
    - Subfamily: Arvicolinae
      - Genus: Microtus
        - †Tyrrhenian vole, M. henseli EX

=== Order: Lagomorpha (lagomorphs) ===
- Family: Ochotonidae (pikas)
  - Genus: †Prolagus
    - †Sardinian pika, P. sardus EX

=== Order: Eulipotyphla ===
- Family: Soricidae (shrews)
  - Subfamily: Soricinae
    - Genus: †Asoriculus
      - †Asoriculus similis EX
- Family: Talpidae (moles)
  - Genus: Talpa
    - †Tyrrhenian mole, T. tyrrhenica EX

=== Order: Carnivora (carnivorans) ===
- Family: Canidae (dogs, foxes, wolves)
  - Genus †Cynotherium
    - †Sardinian dhole, C. sardous EX
- Family: Mustelidae
  - Subfamily: Ictonychinae
    - Genus: †Enhydrictis
      - †Enhydrictis galictoides EX
  - Subfamily:Lutrinae (otters)
    - Genus: †Sardolutra
    - Genus: †Algarolutra
    - Genus: †Megalenhydris

=== Order: Artiodactyla (even-toed ungulates) ===
- Family: Cervidae (deer)
  - Subfamily: Cervinae
    - Genus: †Praemegaceros
      - †Praemegaceros cazioti EX Extinct after 5700 BC

== See also ==
- List of amphibians of Sardinia
- List of chordate orders
- Lists of mammals by region
- List of prehistoric mammals
- Mammal classification
- List of mammals described in the 2000s
