= Lutra simplicidens =

Lutra simplicidens Temporal range: Early Pleistocene

Scientific classification
- Kingdom: Animalia
- Phylum: Chordata
- Class: Mammalia
- Order: Carnivora
- Family: Mustelidae
- Genus: Lutra
- Species: †L. simplicidens

Binomial name
- †Lutra simplicidens Thenius, 1965

Extinct species of otter

Lutra simplicidens, the Hundsheim otter, is an extinct species of otter from the early Pleistocene period, located within the Mediterranean region in Europe. It is considered to be the earliest ancestor of most Middle Pleistocene and Holocene otter species within the Mediterranean area. Most fossil remains found of Lutra simplicidens are scarce, with all reports being within differing locations across Europe.

== Description ==
According to current fossil records, Lutra simplicidens was a medium-sized otter, with an average weight of around 6.5-7.0 kg. Unlike modern day European otters such as the Eurasian otter (Lutra lutra), Lutra simplicidens exhibits traits that display a more specialized adaptation to its aquatic environment. For example, records seem to indicate that Lutra simplicidens had a particularly curved humerus bone, suggesting that it was able to withstand flexing and straining while swimming.

The species also displays signs of well-developed extensor muscles, which allows for better and more efficient dog paddle swimming. Lutra simplicidens has a shorter femur bone, allowing for more precise back swing of the legs during swimming. In terms of diet, the flat dental structure of Lutra simplicidens suggests a fish-feeding diet.

== Fossil remains ==
Fossil remains that pertain to Lutra simplicidens continue to be sparse, with traces of the species having only been found within separate locations which include; Chumbur Kosa, Valdarno, Hundsheim, East Runton, West Runton, Mosbach, and Voigtstedt.

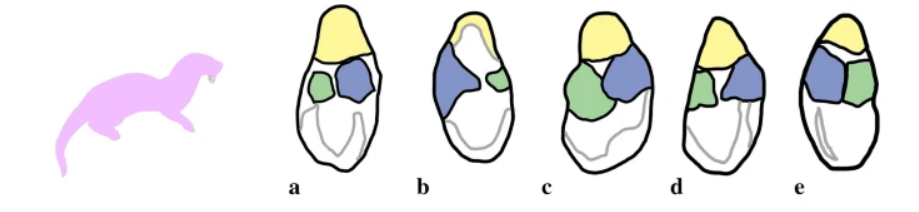
Diagram showcasing the lower carnassial of Lutra simplicidens

Most of what has been discovered regarding Lutra simplicidens has been traces of incomplete mandibles and partially preserved dentition. Specifically, a right mandible and left upper fourth premolar. The overall dental structure of the species points towards a more simple construction compared to modern otter species. In addition, a right femur, left tibia, right calcaneus, left ulna, right astragalus, left metacarpal, and humerus bone have all been recovered in varying locations.

Currently, there have been no official findings of cranial material (complete skull) of Lutra simplicidens.

== Geographical ancestry ==
The remains found within varying sites suggests that the species resided primarily in Central and Western Europe, dominating most other otter species that may have lived within the region. Data suggests that sometime during the Middle Pleistocene period, the species expanded and reached varying parts of Europe, evolving into different otter species that would become commonplace within the middle to late Pleistocene period. Some of these species that evolved from Lutra simplicidens include:

- Sardolutra ichnusae
- Megalenhydris barbaricina
- Algarolutra majori
- Lutra euxena
- Lutra trinacriae
- Lutra castiglionis

The evolutionary ancestry of Lutra simplicidens remains largely unknown. The only possible candidate as an ancestor to the species is Lutra fatimazohrae. The fossilized material of both species share striking similarities to one another. However, the larger size of L. fatimazohrae, as well as further developed metaconids may rule out the possibility of shared ancestry.

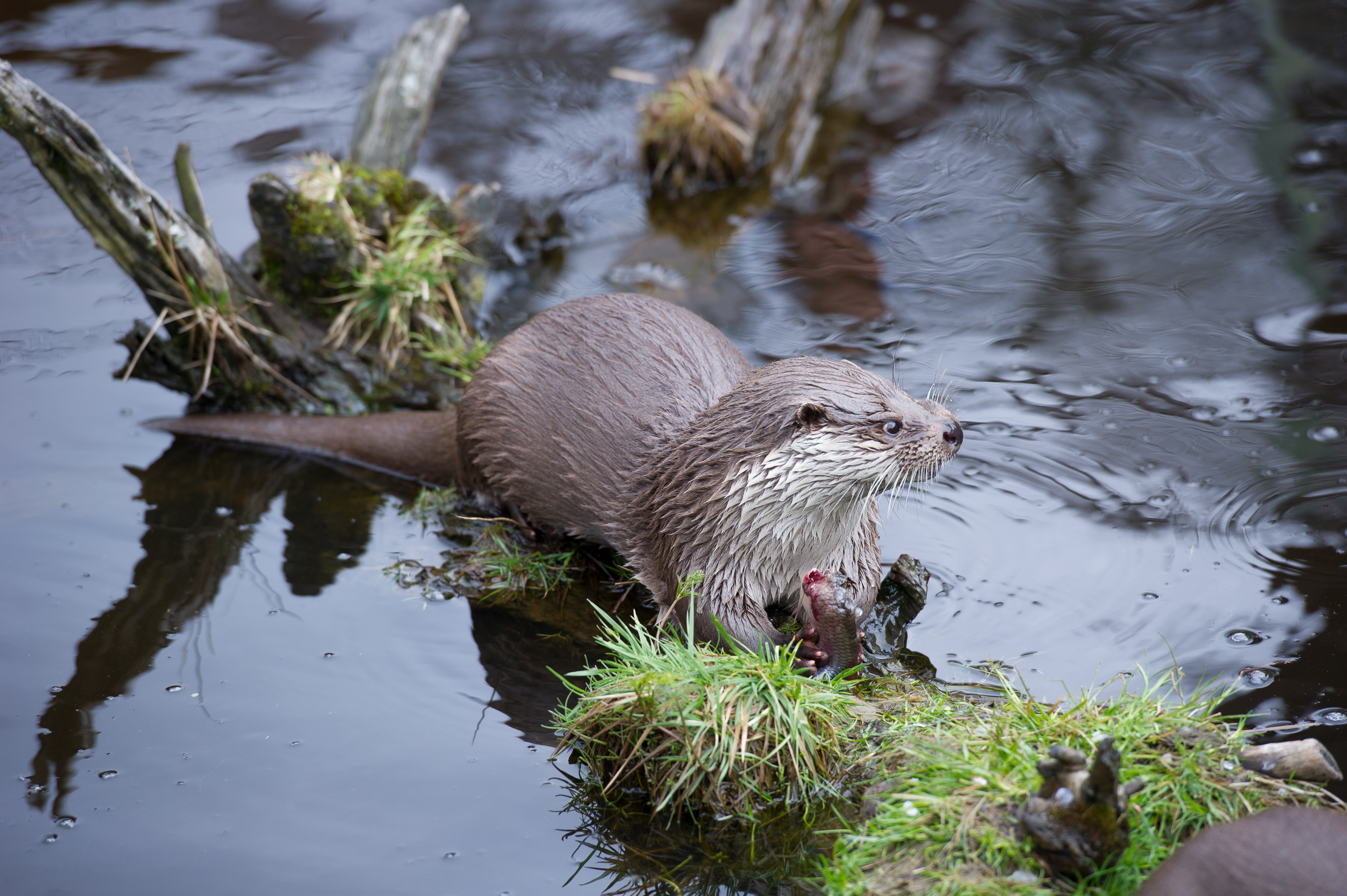
European otter (Lutra lutra)

Towards the late Middle Pleistocene and beginning of the late Pleistocene, Lutra lutra migrated from Asia, dispersing into Europe and essentially replacing Lutra simplicidens as the modern dominating otter species.

== Sources ==
- Cherin, Marco (2017). "New material of Lutra simplicidens (Carnivora, Mustelidae, Lutrinae), a key taxon for understanding the evolution of European otters". Rivista Italiana di Paleontologia e Stratigrafia. 123 (3). Rome: Società Paleontologica Italiana: 433–441. doi:10.13130/2039-4942/9024.
- Kurten, Bjorn (1968). Pleistocene Mammals in Europe (1st ed.). Stockholm, Sweden: Almqvist & Wiksell International. p. 107. ISBN 978-0-202-30953-8.
- Mecozzi, Beniamino (2022). "Rediscovering Lutra lutra from Grotta Romanelli (southern Italy) in the framework of the puzzling evolutionary history of Eurasian otter". Journal of Vertebrate Paleontology. 96 (1). Paläontologische Zeitschrift: Society of Vertebrate Paleontology: 161–174. Bibcode:2022PalZ...96..161M. doi:10.1007/s12542-021-00553-y. hdl:2434/891052.
- Willemsen, Gerard (1992). "A Revision of the Pliocene and Quaternary Lutrinae from Europe". Scripta Geologica. 101. Leiden, the Netherlands: Geological Institute of the University of Leiden: 1–115. ISSN 0375-7633.
- Willemsen, Gerard (2006). "Megalenhydris and its relationship to Lutra Reconsidered". Hellenic Journal of Geosciences. 41. Athens, Greece: National and Kapodistrian University of Athens, Faculty of Geology and Geoenvironment: 83–87. ISSN 1105-0004.
