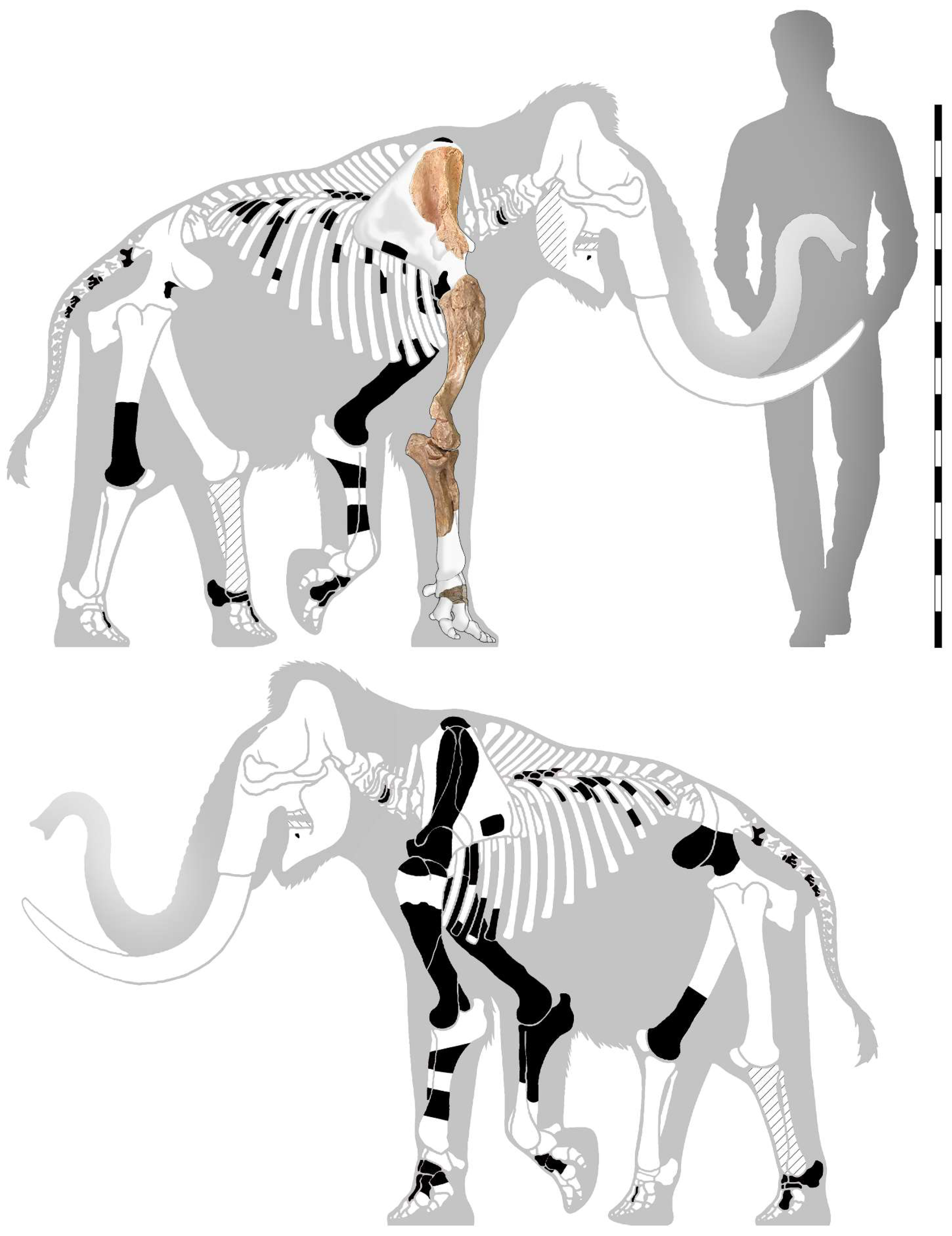
- Composite skeleton of known remains showing size of an adult compared to a human. Full scale bar 150 cm, with each black and white section being 10 cm

Scientific classification
- Kingdom: Animalia
- Phylum: Chordata
- Class: Mammalia
- Order: Proboscidea
- Family: Elephantidae
- Genus: †Mammuthus
- Species: †M. lamarmorai

Binomial name
- †Mammuthus lamarmorai (Forsyth Major, 1883)

Synonyms
- Mammuthus lamarmorae; Elephas lamarmorae

= Mammuthus lamarmorai =

Sardinian mammoth Temporal range: 0.45–0.04 Ma Pleistocene

Extinct species of mammal

Mammuthus lamarmorai is a species of dwarf mammoth which lived during the late Middle and Late Pleistocene (between 450,000 and perhaps 40,000 years ago) on the island of Sardinia in the Mediterranean. It has been estimated to have had a shoulder height of around 1.4 metres (4.6 ft). Remains have been found across the western part of the island.

== Description ==
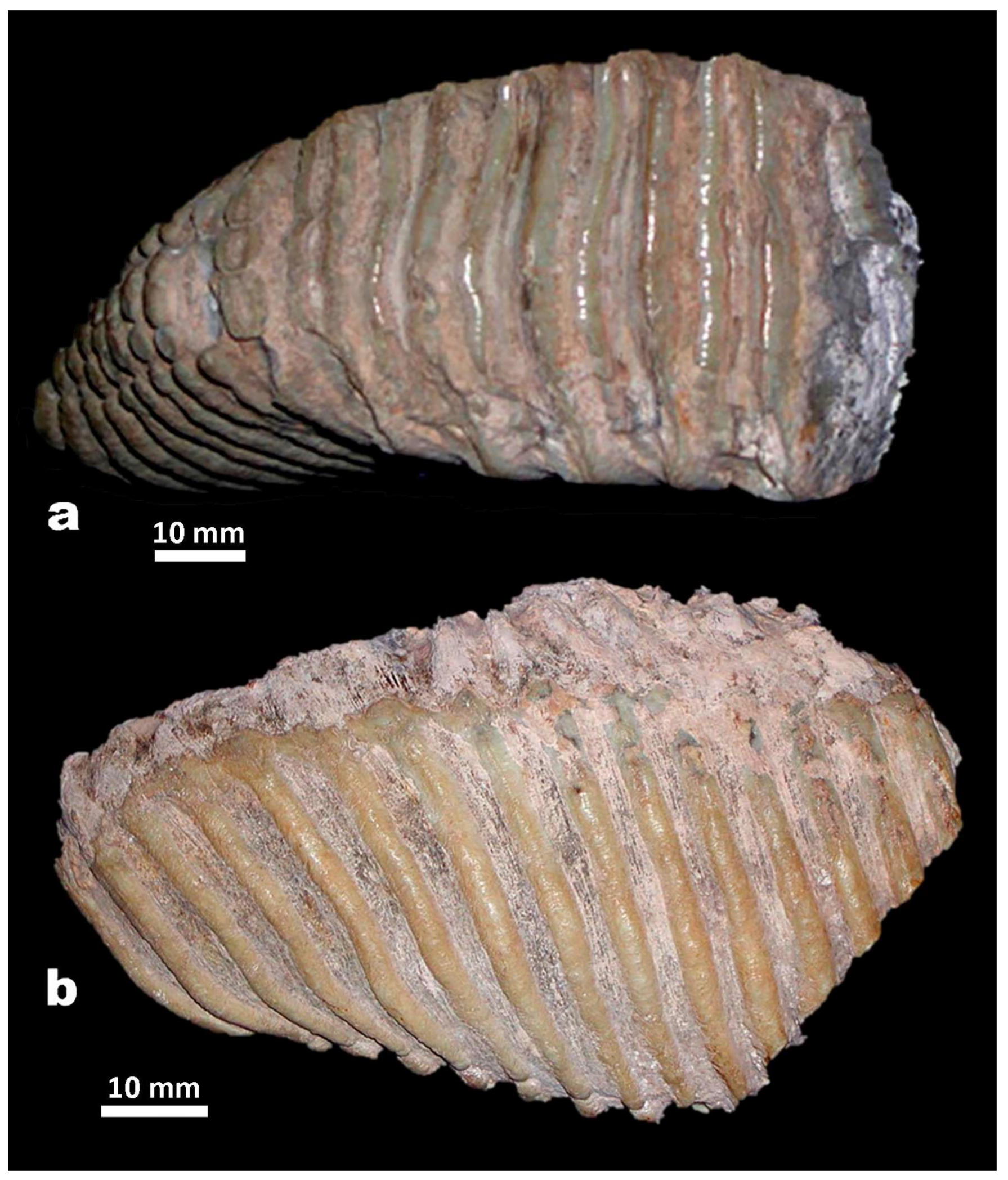
Upper third molar

M. lamaromorai is only known from a small number of remains, including a fragmentary partial skeleton, and isolated finds of other bones. Of the few known molars only one represents the rearmost tooth, which is 13 cm long and 6.9 cm wide, with at least eleven ridges on the enamel. The humerus reaches a length of 45 centimetres (18 in). The few discovered tusk fragments exhibit only a small maximum diameter of 3.5 centimetres (1.4 in). The length of the femur indicates a shoulder height of 1.4 metres (4.6 ft). Weight estimates have varied considerably, from 420 kilograms (930 lb) to 1,650 kilograms (3,640 lb). The small size of M. lamarmorai is attributed to insular dwarfism, which occurred when its larger ancestors reached Sardinia, reducing their size due to lack of potential predators and reduced food supply.

== Discovery ==
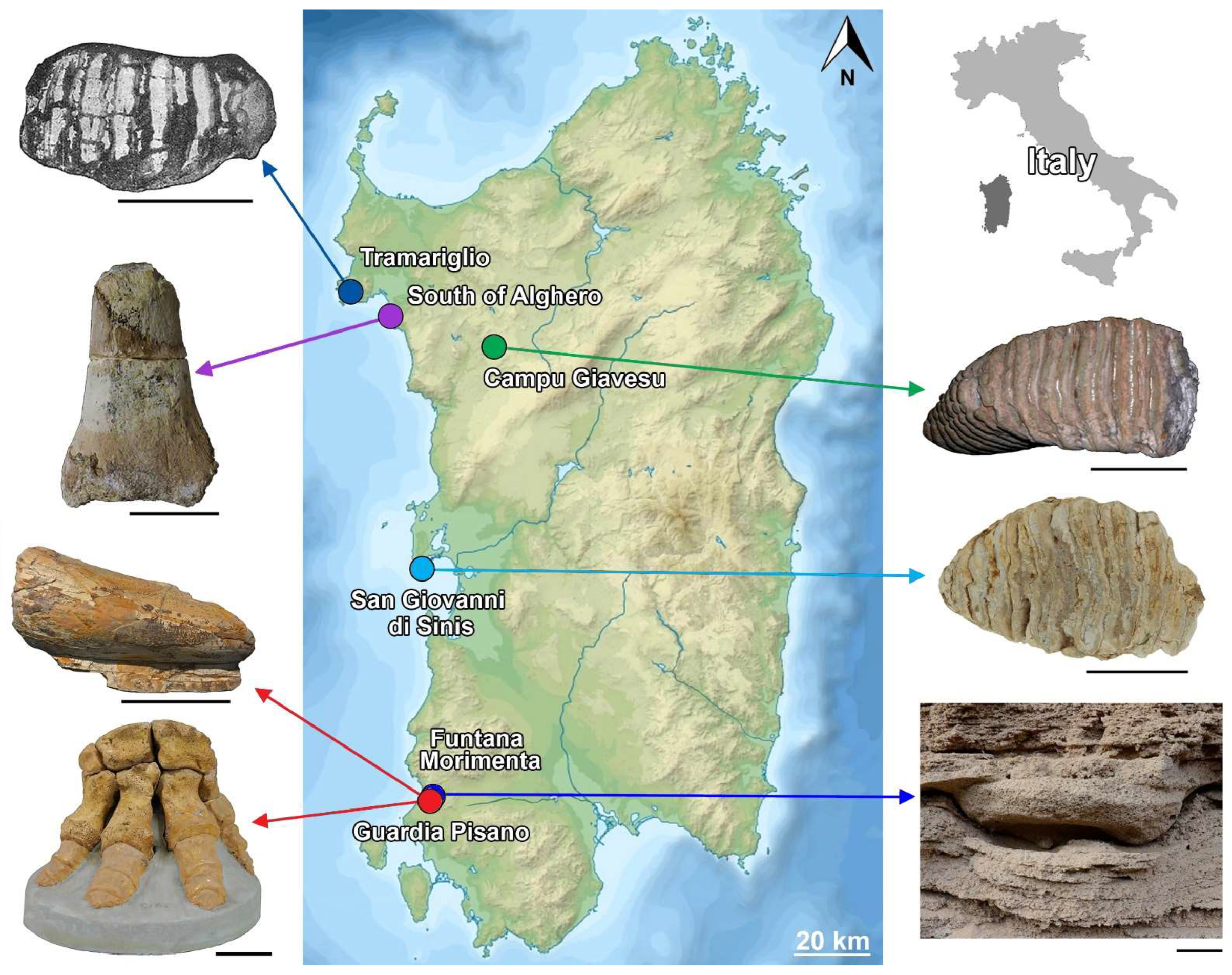
Map of Sardinia showing localities where various specimens have been found

The holotype specimen of M. lamarmorai is a partial skeleton collected during the late 19th century from Guardia Pisano Hill near Gonnesa in southwest Sardinia, which was being excavated as a result of railway construction.

Most finds of M. lamarmorai were discovered on the west coast and in the western part of the island of Sardinia, and mainly comprise individual finds, but also belong to associated skeletal elements. The most important fossils are from Funtana Morimenta, a quarry south-southwest of Gonnesa in the valley of Rio Morimenta where it had already been discovered at the end of the 19th century. These fossils embedded in the Funtana-Morimenta lineup, which is composed of aeolian sedimentary formation that is located below a layer of strata dominated by a rock unit of conglomerates (the Tyrrhenian conglomerate). This rock formation is widely spread all over the west coast of Sardinia and is generally attributed to the last interglacial period that bears in northern Alpine region the term Eemian (126000–115000 years ago). The finds include mainly elements of the spine and musculoskeletal system, so among other things, a full foot, nearly complete hand, humerus and ulna, as well as remains of tusks. All discoveries are most likely to belong to a single individual. Other finds are known from San Giovanni di Sinis near Oristano, where a molar tooth was found in also deposited before the Eemian sediments, as well as an additional molar from Campu Giavesu in Sassari, which is, however, significantly larger. Finds from the Upper Pleistocene, which comprise a plurality of teeth, are mainly from Tramariglio near the city of Alghero.They also came from sediments deposited by wind, but these come from above the Tyrrhenian conglomerate.

== Classification ==
As a mammoth, M. lamarmorai's closest living relative is the modern Asian elephant (Elephas maximus). The occurrence of this mammoth in the late Middle Pleistocene makes descent from the woolly mammoth (M. primigenius) rather unlikely, since the latter species first appeared in Europe during the Upper Pleistocene. Rather, it is thought that the steppe mammoth (M. trogontherii), which lived on the continent, is the likely ancestor of M. lamarmorai. The steppe mammoth's molars possess only eleven ridges, a feature much more archaic than those of the woolly mammoth, which had twenty six ridges. The Cretan pygmy mammoth (M. creticus) and M. lamarmorai are the only known dwarf mammoths on the islands of the Mediterranean Sea, which were otherwise occupied by diminutive members of the genus Palaeoloxodon (also included sometimes in Elephas).

The remains from Guardia Pisano Hill were initially attributed by Luigi Acconci in 1881 to Elephas melitensis. The first proper description was published in 1883 by Charles Immanuel Forsyth Major, who used the name Elephas lamarmorae. He saw a clear link to the Southern mammoth (M. meridionalis), which he in turn called Elephas meridionalis due to similarities. The remains were from the quarry Funtana Morimenta and are now kept in the Natural History Museum of Basel, where Major personally studied them. Because of new tooth finds since the mid-20th century, its close connection to mammoths became clear, allowing the name Mammuthus lamarmorae to prevail. As a result of adaptation to the International Code of Zoological Nomenclature, the name was amended to Mammuthus lamarmorai, which is currently the valid species name. The species name, lamarmorai, honors to the Sardinian General and naturalist Alberto La Marmora (1789–1863), who had already in 1858 investigated the fossils of Funtana Morimenta.

== Chronology ==
The origin of M. lamarmorai is still relatively unclear – the earliest finds date from the latter part of the Middle Pleistocene, and it is thought that they colonised the island sometime after 450,000 years ago. This colonisation likely occurred during a glacial period in which the global sea level was much lower due to the continental ice sheets and the animals could reach the island by swimming. A securely dated tusk-remnant found in sandstone near Alghero is thought to date to around 100,000 years ago, during the early Late Pleistocene. A partial tibia likely referrable to the species found near Alghero in NW Sardinia has been suggested to date to MIS 3-4, around 57,000–29,000 years Before Present, though the bones were found out of stratigraphic context, and the date is based on correlation between the matrix surrounding the bones and the beach deposits.

== Paleoenvironment ==
During the Middle-Late Pleistocene Corsica and Sardinia had their own highly endemic depauperate terrestrial mammal fauna which besides M. lamarmorai included the Tyrrhenian field rat, (Rhagamys orthodon) the Tyrrhenian vole (Microtus henseli), the Sardinian pika (Prolagus sardus), a shrew (Asoriculus similis), a mole (Talpa tyrrhenica), the Sardinian dhole (Cynotherium sardous), a galictine mustelid (Enhydrictis galictoides), three species of otter (Algarolutra majori, Sardolutra ichnusae, Megalenhydris barbaricina) and a deer (Praemegaceros cazioti).

== See also ==
- Mammuthus exilis, a dwarf mammoth species known from the Channel Islands of California
