= Microtus henseli =

Microtus henseli Temporal range: Middle Pleistocene-Holocene

Scientific classification
- Kingdom: Animalia
- Phylum: Chordata
- Class: Mammalia
- Infraclass: Placentalia
- Order: Rodentia
- Family: Cricetidae
- Subfamily: Arvicolinae
- Genus: Microtus
- Species: †M. henseli

Binomial name
- †Microtus henseli ( F. Major, 1905)

Synonyms
- Tyrrhenicola henseli F. Major, 1905

Extinct species of rodent

Microtus (Tyrrhenicola) henseli is an extinct species of vole belonging to the genus Microtus that was endemic to Sardinia and Corsica during the Pleistocene and Holocene.

== Taxonomy and evolution ==
It is placed in the subgenus Tyrrhenicola, alongside its probable ancestor, the early Middle Pleistocene species Microtus (Tyrrhenicola) sondaari, which probably descended from a population of Allophaiomys that arrived in Sardinia between 1.2 million and 0.8 million years ago. The arrival of Microtus (Tyrrhenicola) on Sardinia marks a faunal turnover event from the Early Pleistocene Nesogoral faunal complex and the Middle-Late Pleistocene Microtus (Tyrrhenicola) faunal complex. The oldest dates for M. henseli are over 500,000 years old. The youngest dates for the species on Sardinia around 1300 BC, while in Corsica the species is suggested to have become extinct between 393 BC and the 6th century AD. It may have become extinct as a result of introductions of invasive species to the islands by humans.

== Description ==
Microtus (Tyrrhenicola) henseli had an estimated body mass of approximately 277 grams (9.8 oz), substantially larger than its mainland ancestors, an example of island gigantism.

== Paleoenviroment ==
During the Middle-Late Pleistocene Corsica and Sardinia had their own highly endemic depauperate terrestrial mammal fauna which besides M. henseli included the Tyrrhenian field rat (Rhagamys orthodon), the Sardinian pika (Prolagus sardus), a shrew (Asoriculus similis), a mole (Talpa tyrrhenica), the Sardinian dhole (Cynotherium sardous), a galictine mustelid (Enhydrictis galictoides), a dwarf mammoth (Mammuthus lamarmorai), three species of otter (Algarolutra majori, Sardolutra ichnusae, Megalenhydris barbaricina) and a deer (Praemegaceros cazioti).
