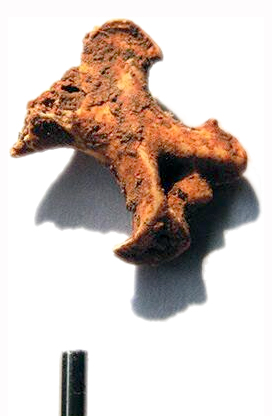
- Fossil humerus of the Tyrrhenian mole (Talpa tyrrhenica)

Conservation status
- Extinct

Scientific classification
- Kingdom: Animalia
- Phylum: Chordata
- Class: Mammalia
- Infraclass: Placentalia
- Order: Eulipotyphla
- Family: Talpidae
- Genus: Talpa
- Species: †T. tyrrhenica

Binomial name
- †Talpa tyrrhenica Bate, 1945

= Talpa tyrrhenica =

Tyrrhenian mole Temporal range: Pleistocene

Extinct species of mammal

Talpa tyrrhenica, also known as the Tyrrhenian mole, is an extinct species of mole belonging to the genus Talpa. It was endemic to the Mediterranean islands of Corsica and Sardinia during the Pleistocene epoch.

It was first described in 1945 by Dorothea Bate, Remains with affinities to the species extend back to around 2 to 2.1 million years ago on the archipelago, during the Early Pleistocene. It is suggested to have evolved from the mainland European species Talpa minor, which is known from the archipelago during the Pliocene. It is estimated to have been around 15% larger than its mainland ancestor. The species survived into the Late Pleistocene, but the timing of its extinction is uncertain due to a lack of radiocarbon dates.

== Paleoenviroment ==
During the Middle-Late Pleistocene Corsica and Sardinia had their own highly endemic depauperate terrestrial mammal fauna which besides T. tyrrhenica included the Tyrrhenian field rat (Rhagamys orthodon), the Sardinian pika (Prolagus sardus), a shrew (Asoriculus similis), the Tyrrhenian vole (Microtus henseli), the Sardinian dhole (Cynotherium sardous), a galictine mustelid (Enhydrictis galictoides), a dwarf mammoth (Mammuthus lamarmorai), three species of otter (Algarolutra majori, Sardolutra ichnusae, Megalenhydris barbaricina) and a deer (Praemegaceros cazioti).

== See also ==
- List of extinct animals of Europe
