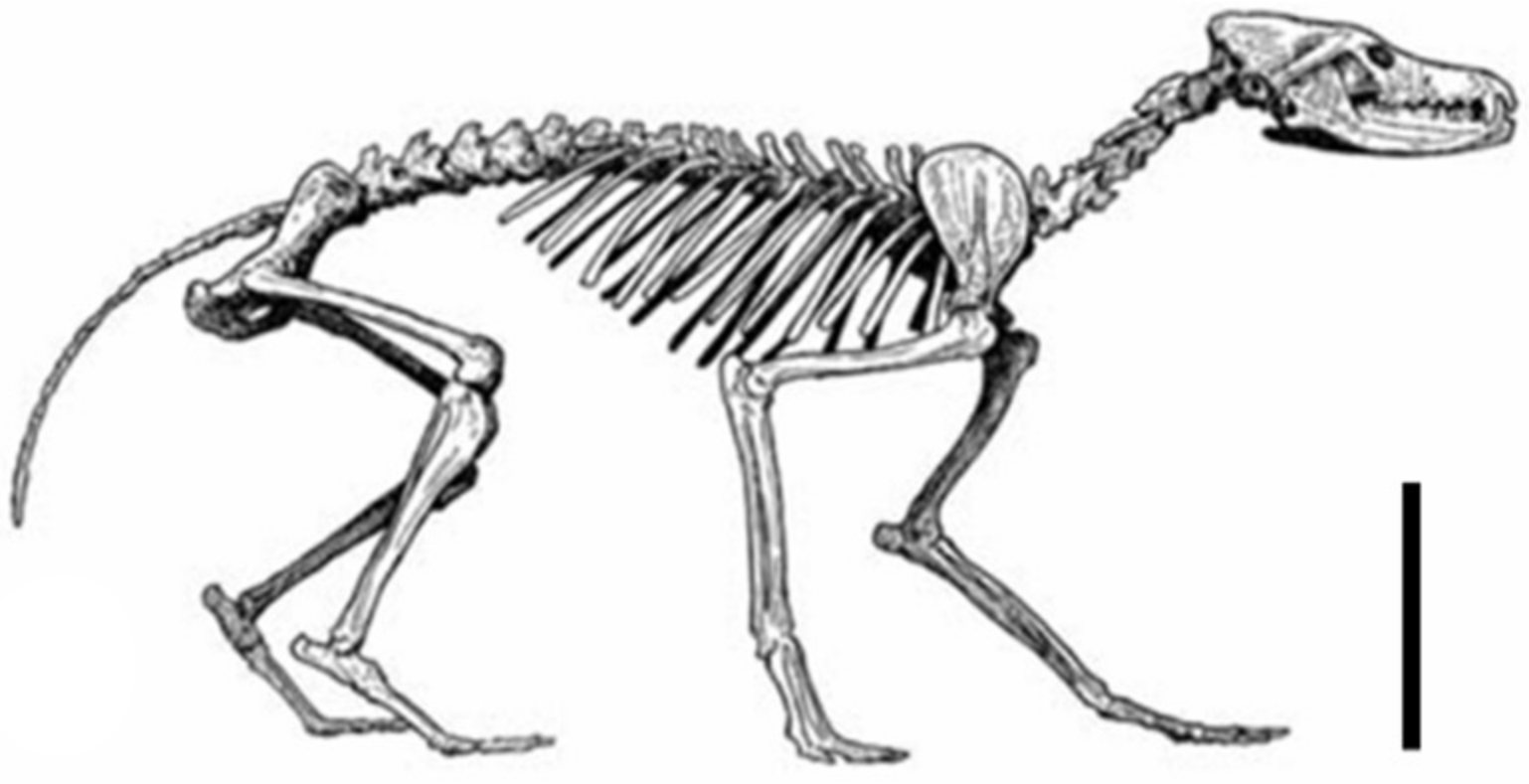
- Drawing of the skeleton of C. sardous scale bar = 20 cm

Scientific classification
- Kingdom: Animalia
- Phylum: Chordata
- Class: Mammalia
- Infraclass: Placentalia
- Order: Carnivora
- Family: Canidae
- Subfamily: Caninae
- Tribe: Canini
- Genus: †Cynotherium; Studiati, 1857

Type species
- Cynotherium sardous Studiati, 1857

Other species
- Cynotherium malatestai Madurell-Malapeira, Palombo & Sotnikova, 2015
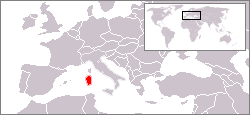
- Former range (in red)

= Sardinian dhole =

Sardinian dhole Temporal range: Middle Pleistocene-Holocene

Extinct species of carnivore

The Sardinian dhole (genus Cynotherium especially C. sardous) is an extinct insular canid which was endemic to what is now the Mediterranean islands of Sardinia and Corsica during the Middle-Late Pleistocene. It went extinct at the end of the Pleistocene around the time of human settlement of the islands.

Its scientific name means "dog-beast of Sardinia", the genus name from the Ancient Greek: θήρ, romanized: thḗr, lit. 'beast', 'wild animal' and κύων, kyōn, 'dog' and the specific name from the Latin: Sardous, lit. 'of Sardinia', alt. form of Latin: Sardus.

Around the size of a jackal, morphological studies indicate it was a specialised stalking predator of small mammals and birds, with a probable preference for the endemic Sardinian pika.

== Evolution ==
The oldest remains of Cynotherium on Sardinia date to around the early-Middle Pleistocene transition around 800,000 years ago, associated with a faunal turnover event on Sardinia likely caused by low sea levels allowing dispersal to Sardinia-Corsica from mainland Italy. Cynotherium is suggested to have originated from the species Xenocyon lycaonoides of mainland Europe. Some of the older Cynotherium remains are assigned to the separate species Cynotherium malatestai, which is larger than C. sardous and shows intermediate features between it and X. lycaonoides. A 2021 genetic study found that its closest living relative is the dhole, from which it diverged approximately 885,000 years ago. The study found that the lineage of the Sardinan dhole and dhole emerged from the hybridisation between a lineage closely related to the genus Canis and a lineage related to the African wild dog (Lycaon pictus) in proportions of roughly 65% and 35% respectively. The modern dhole was also found to have additional African wild dog related ancestry (making up around 25% of its genome) not found in the Sardinan dhole.

== Description ==
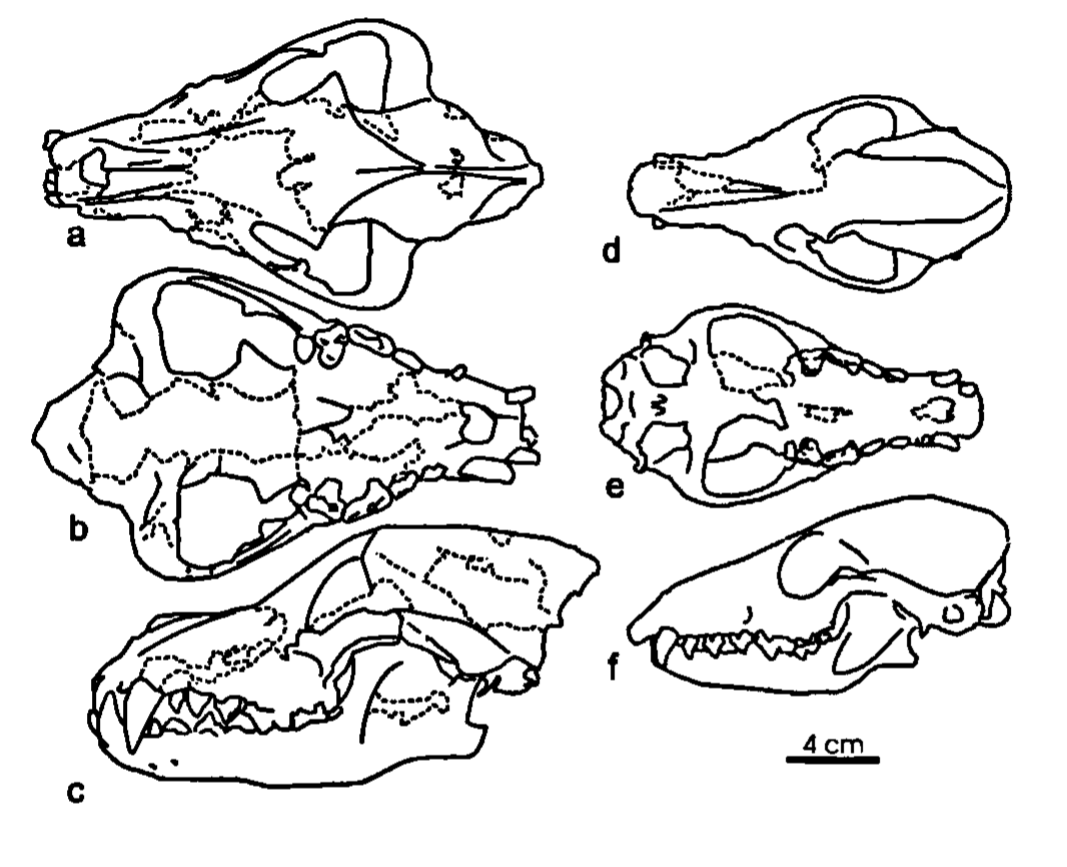
Skull of the Sardinian dhole (right) compared to its presumed ancestor Xenocyon lycaonoides

Size comparison of the Sardinian dhole to a human

C. sardous was relatively small in size, with a weight around 10 kilograms (22 lb), comparable to a jackal. The skull is slender and wedge-shaped in lateral view. The snout is narrower than in extant dholes, but broader than those of foxes. The postorbital region of the skull is broad, and the zygomatic arches only modestly project outwards. The mastoid is very enlarged and projects outwards. The sagittal crest is weakly developed. The mandible is slender. The attachment sites for the triceps on the scapula, ulna and humerus are large, indicating the muscle, along with the anconeus, was well developed. The scar for the deltoid muscle at the posterior of the deltoid ridge on the humerus is high, large and rugose, indicating this muscle was also well developed. Analysis of its ear morpology, including the significant reduction in the number of cochlear turns, suggests a specialisation towards the hearing of high-frequency sounds, but suggests it was poor at detecting low frequency sounds, and completely unable to detect sounds lower than 250 Hz.

== Paleobiology and paleoecology ==
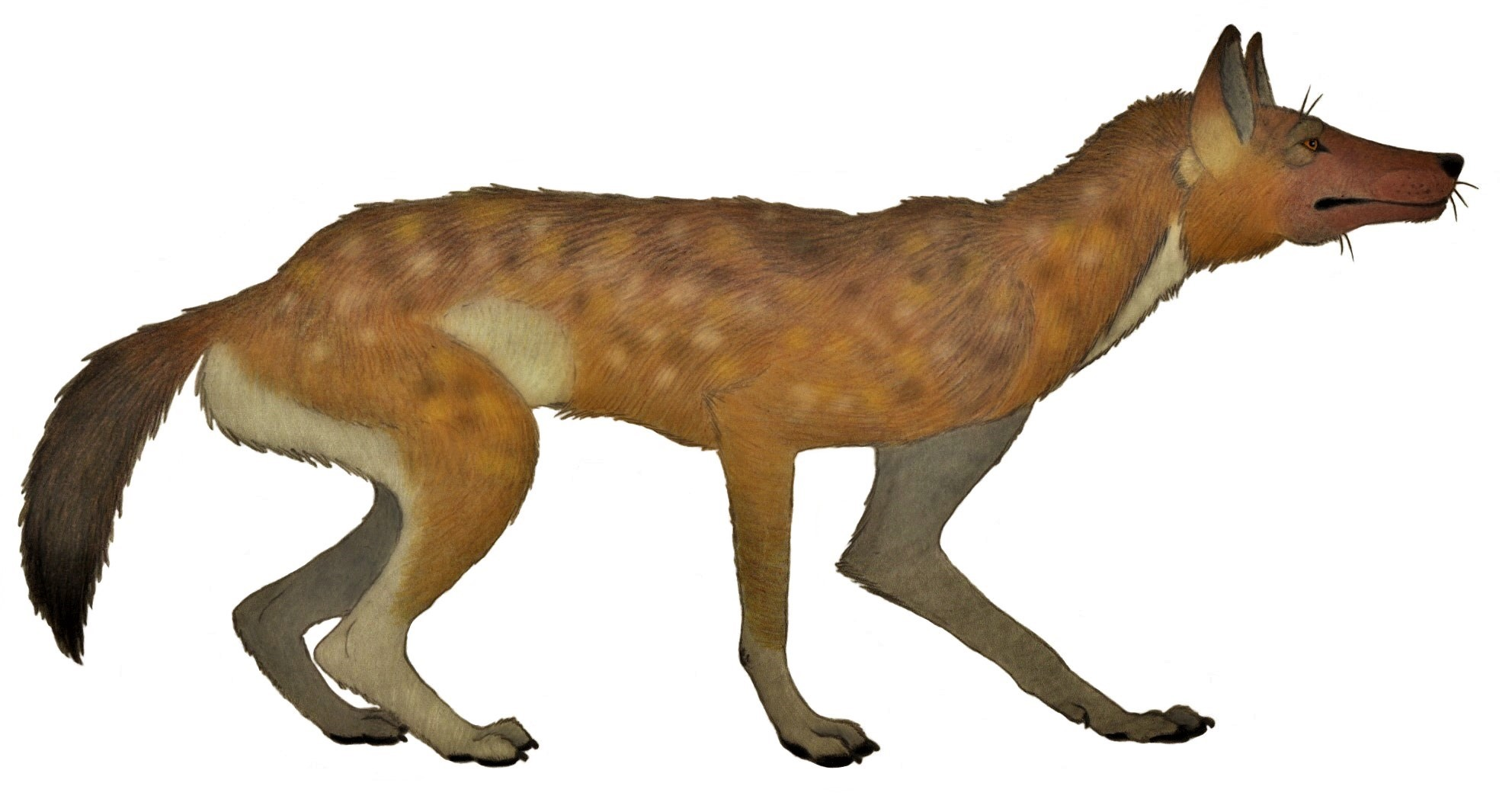
Life restoration

When the ancestor of this canid became confined to the island, its diet became limited to small prey. Cynotherium as a predator specializing in small, fast moving prey is supported by an examination of the animal's anatomy. The evolution of short, powerful limbs, a low neck carriage and increased head and neck mobility suggests an animal specialised for stalking low to the ground, and then quickly pouncing on or running down prey. A suggested preferred prey item of the Sardinian dhole is the Sardinian pika (Prolagus sardus), a large lagomorph that was also endemic and abundant on the island, with birds also being likely targets.

During the Middle and Late Pleistocene Corsica and Sardinia had their own highly endemic depauperate terrestrial mammal fauna which besides the Sardinian dhole and Sardinian pika, included the Tyrrhenian field rat, (Rhagamys orthodon) the Tyrrhenian vole (Microtus henseli), a shrew (Asoriculus similis), a mole (Talpa tyrrhenica), a dwarf mammoth (Mammuthus lamarmorai), a galictine mustelid (Enhydrictis galictoides), three species of otter (Algarolutra majori, Sardolutra ichnusae, Megalenhydris barbaricina) and a deer (Praemegaceros cazioti).

== Extinction ==
The youngest radiocarbon dates for the Sardinan dhole are around 11,500 years BC/13,500 years Before Present (BP), only a few thousand years before the first confirmed human presence on Sardian-Corsica around 8,000 BC/10,000 years BP, and it is assumed that the species was alive when humans arrived on the island. The causes of its extinction are uncertain. The low genetic diversity of sampled individuals suggests that the population size had been small but stable for a long period of time prior to extinction.

== See also ==
- List of extinct animals of Europe
- Insular dwarfism
