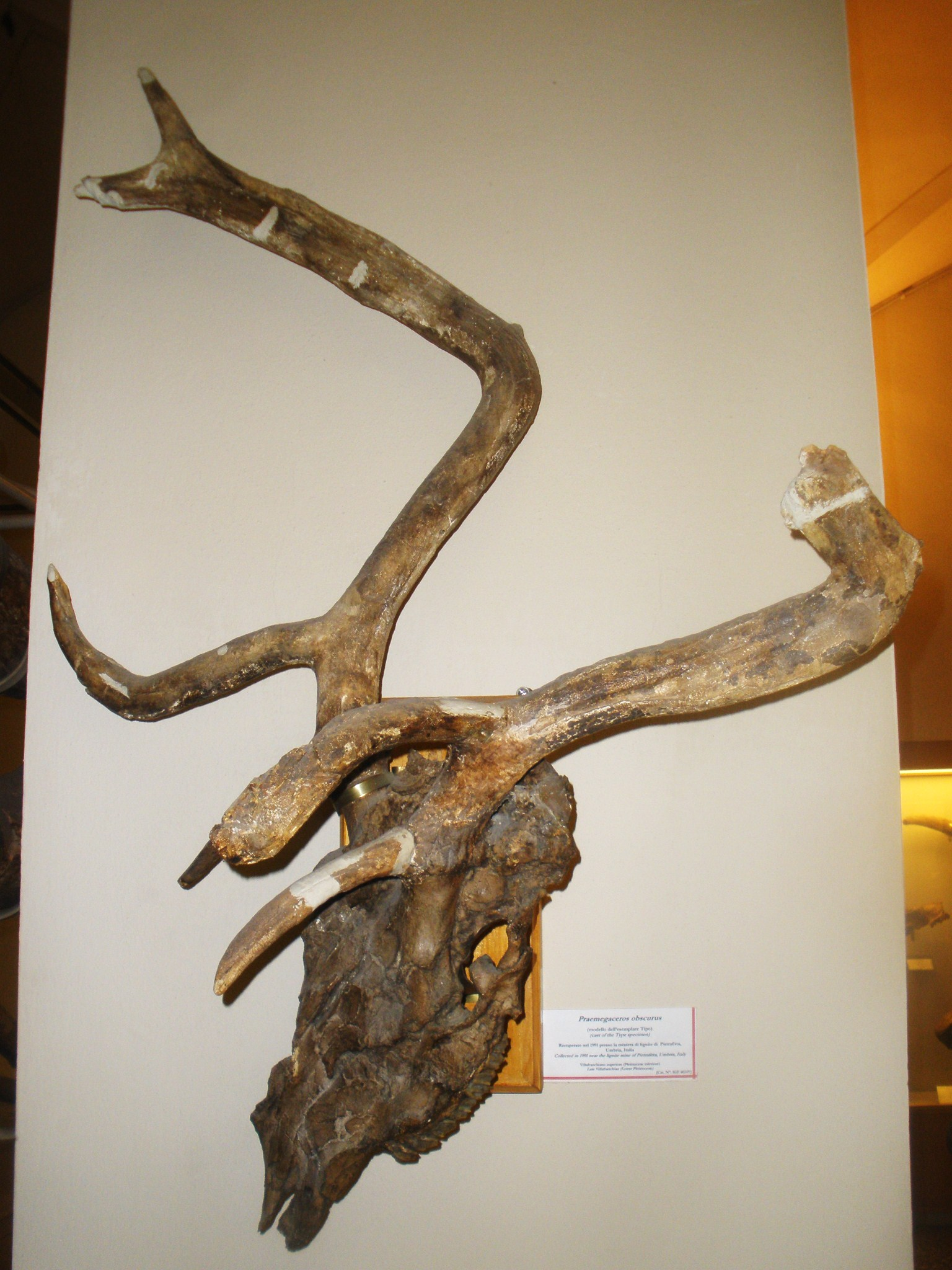
- Skull of P. obscurus
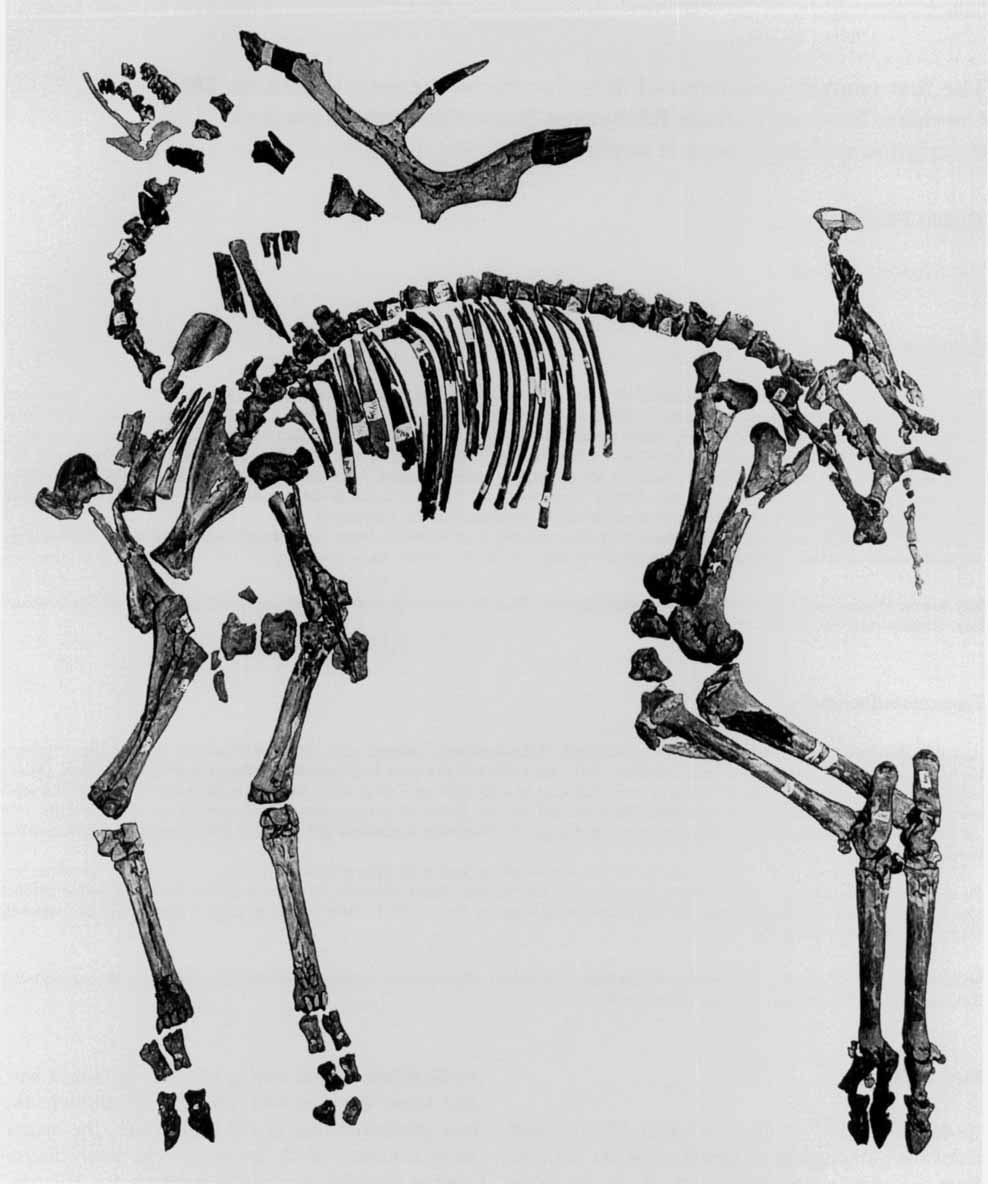
- Skeleton of P. verticornis

Scientific classification
- Kingdom: Animalia
- Phylum: Chordata
- Class: Mammalia
- Order: Artiodactyla
- Family: Cervidae
- Subfamily: Cervinae
- Genus: †Praemegaceros; Portis, 1920

Species
- †P. dawkinsi (type); †P. cazioti; †P. obscurus; †P. pliotarandoides; †P. solilhacus; †P. verticornis

Synonyms
- Praerangifer; Orthogonoceros; Tamanalces

= Praemegaceros =

Praemegaceros Temporal range: Early Pleistocene to Holocene

Extinct genus of deer

Praemegaceros is an extinct genus of deer, known from the Pleistocene and Holocene of Western Eurasia. Praemegaceros is considered to be a genus of "giant deer", with many species having an estimated body mass of around 400 kilograms (880 lb), considerably larger than most living deer.

The genus contains the subgenera Praemegaceros, Orthogonoceros and Nesoleipoceros. It has sometimes been synonymised with Megaloceros and Megaceroides, but is regarded as a distinct genus by most studies. Some authors have considered the genus closely related to Megaloceros, but this has been disputed by others.

The earliest species like P. obscurus and P. verticornis appeared in Europe between 2 and 1.5 million years ago. The genus was widely distributed across Europe, West and Central Asia during the Early Pleistocene and early Middle Pleistocene, with fossils having been discovered in France, Georgia, Germany, England, Greece, Israel, Italy, Romania, Russia Spain, Syria, and Tajikistan. The genus was extinct in mainland Europe and Asia by end of the Middle Pleistocene. An insular species, P. cazioti survived into the Late Pleistocene and Holocene in isolation on the Sardinia-Corsica archipelago until around 5500 BCE (~7500 years ago).

== Taxonomy ==
Praemegaceros was first described as a subgenus of Cervus by Portis in 1920, to include Cervus (Praemegaceros) dawkinsi. Kalkhe in 1956 named Orthogonoceros with the type species of Orthogonoceros (previously Cervus) verticornis. Kalkhe in 1965 recognised that these genera were synonyms, with Praemegaceros having priority. Radulesco & Samson in 1967 designated P. dawkinsi as the type species of the genus, while also naming the new genera Allocaenelaphus, Psecupsoceros, and Nesoleipoceros which are now recognised as synonyms of the genus. Some authors have used the genus "Megaceroides" to include the species usually placed in Praemegaceros, but the type species of Megaceroides, the North African Megaceroides algericus is morphologically distinct from Praemegaceros. Praemegaceros is widely agreed to be belong to the subfamily Cervinae. Praemegaceros is considered a genus of "giant deer", and has often been placed in the tribe Megacerini, alongside genera like Megaloceros and Sinomegaceros, though other authors have disputed the close relationship between Praemegaceros and Megaloceros, alternatively suggesting that the two genera obtained their large size independently, and instead propose a close relationship of Praemegaceros with the (also large-sized) deer Eucladoceros.

Classification according to Croitor, 2018.

=== Subgenus Orthogonoceros ===
==== Praemegaceros pliotarandoides ====
Known from the late Early Pleistocene and Middle Pleistocene of Italy, North Greece, Moldova, South Ukraine and the Azov Sea Region. It was named by De Alessandri in 1903 for remains found in North Italy. Psekupsoceros orientalis is a junior synonym of the taxon. Estimated body mass of around 400 kilograms (880 lb).

==== Praemegaceros verticornis ====
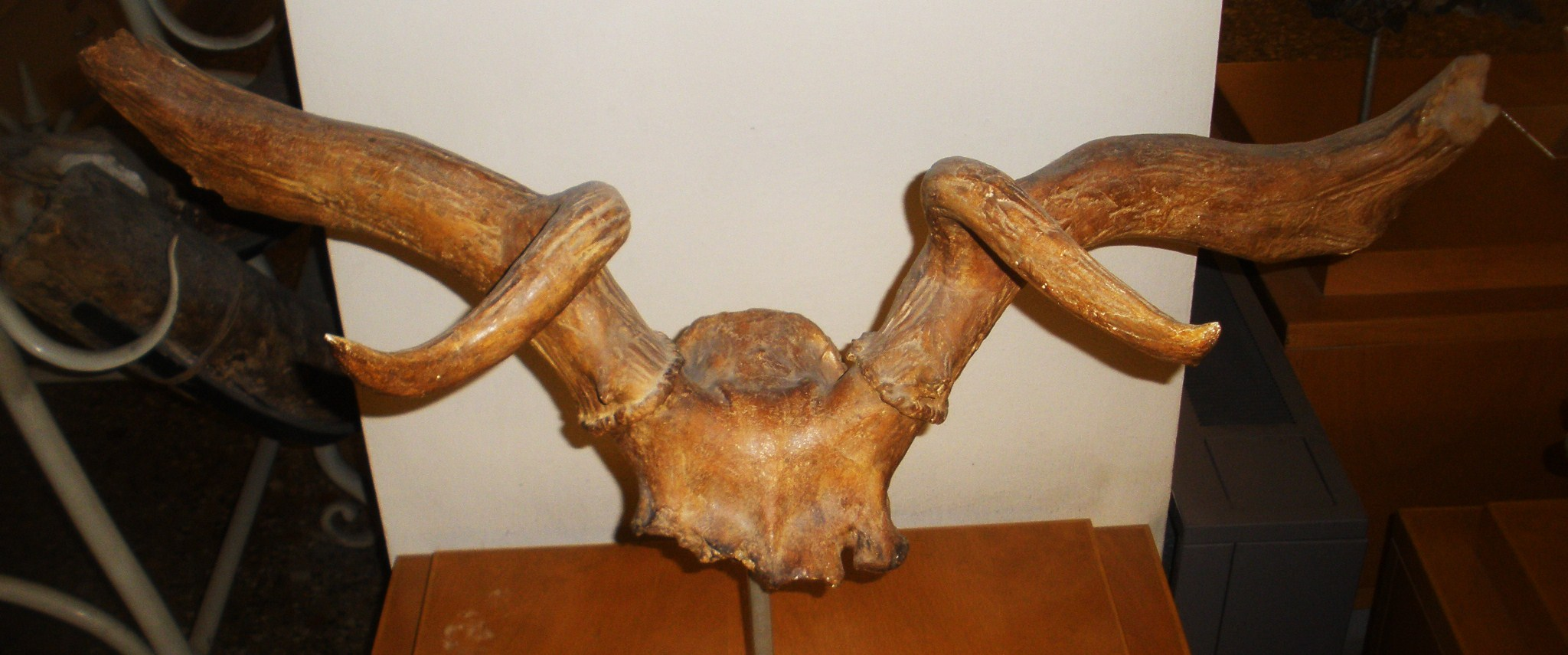
Antlers of P. verticornis

Named by William Boyd Dawkins in 1872 on the basis of a partial antler from the Cromer Forest Bed. Croitor suggests that Cervus belgrandi is a junior synonym. Known from late Early Pleistocene to Middle Pleistocene localities in England, Spain, France, Germany and Italy. Estimated body mass of around 380 kilograms (840 lb).

Isotopic analysis of specimens from the Early Pleistocene (about 1.6 million years ago) Venta Micena locality of southern Spain, suggests that at this locality the species was almost exclusively browsing (feeding on leaves and twigs of high growing plants like shrubs and trees) in forested environments. The species is thought to have gone extinct during Marine Isotope Stage 12 glacial period, around 475-425,000 years ago.^{307}

=== Subgenus Nesoleipoceros ===
==== Praemegaceros solilhacus ====
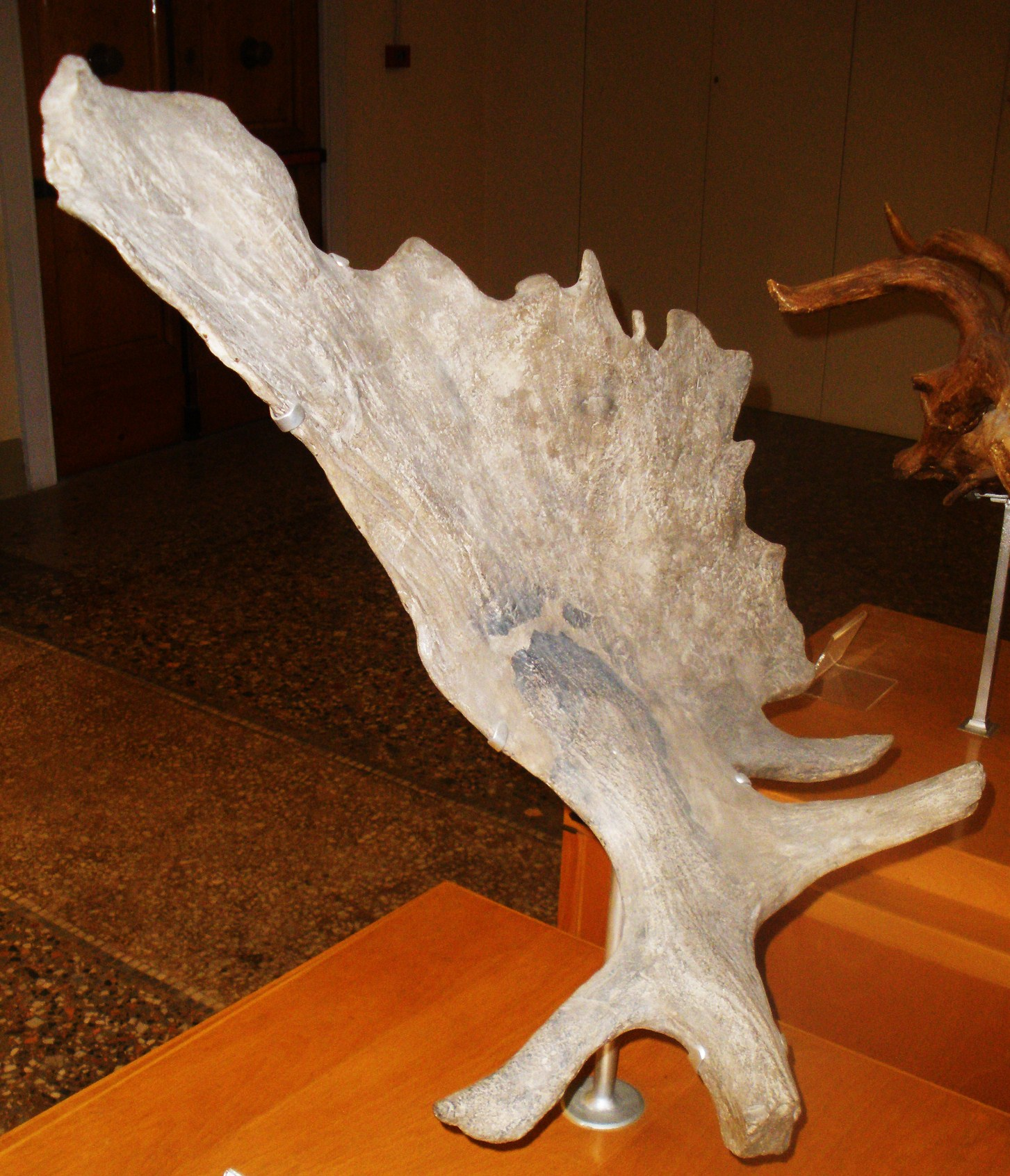
P. solilhacus antler

The species was named by Robert in 1930 for remains from Soleilhac, an early Middle Pleistocene site located in the Massif Central, France. The neotype specimen consists of a partial left frontal with an attached partial antler. The morphology of the preserved antler strongly resembles that of P. cazioti, which suggests a close relationship. Other known sites are from the early Middle Pleistocene of France, Germany, Italy, South Russia and Moldova. This taxon is suggested to be the largest species of Praemegaceros, with an estimated mass of 420 kilograms (930 lb). The taxon appears to have been extinct by the late Middle Pleistocene.

==== Praemegaceros sardous–Praemegaceros cazioti ====
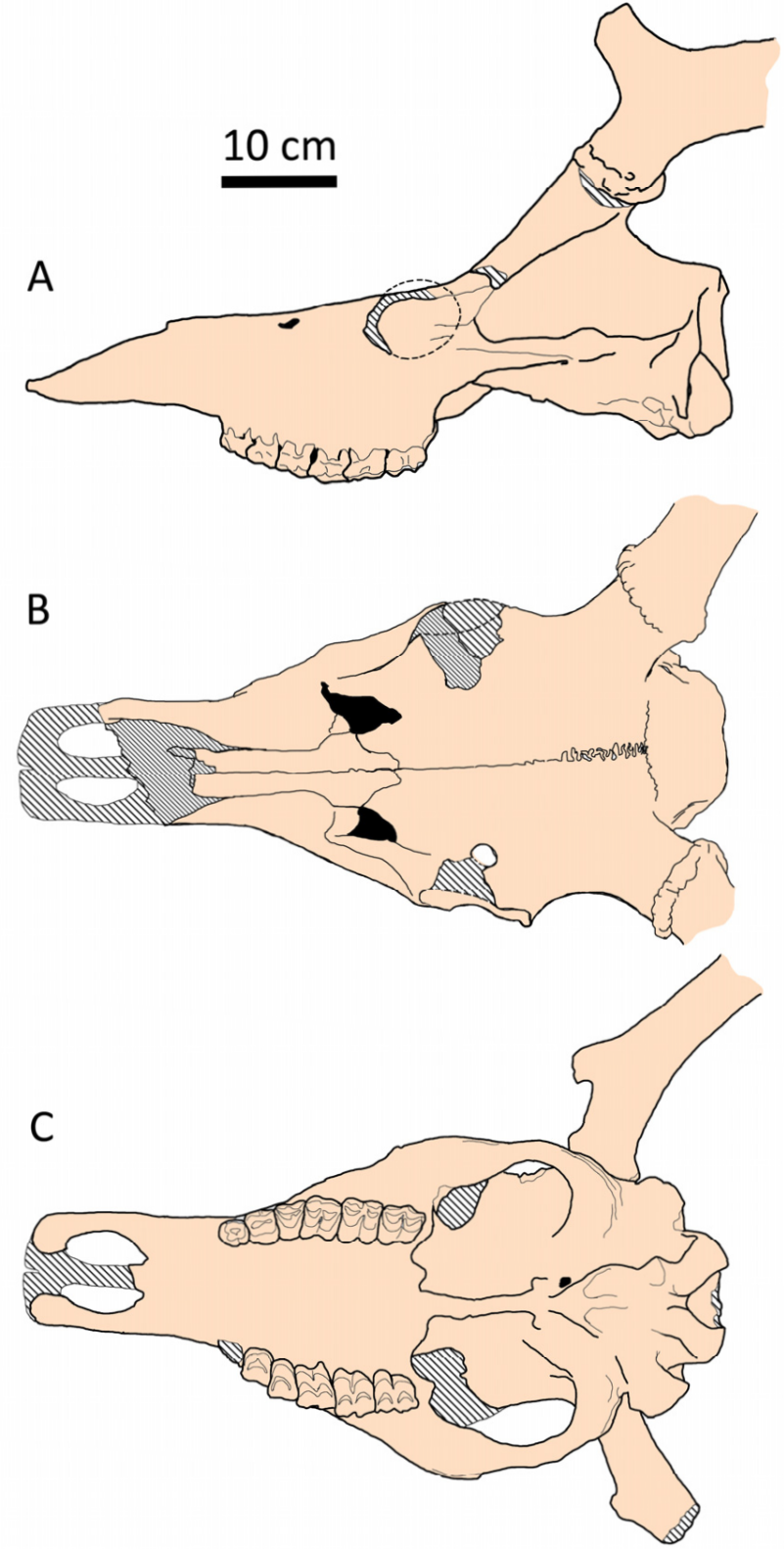
Skull of P. cazioti in various views

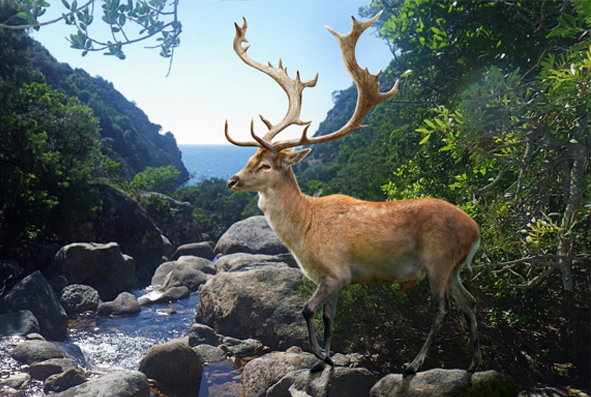
Life restoration of the Sardinian Praemegaceros cazioti by Roman Uchytel

Endemic to the Sardinia-Corsica archipelago from the late Middle Pleistocene to the Early Holocene, the ancestor of P. cazioti appears to have dispersed to the islands during the Middle Pleistocene, with the earliest well dated records of Praemegaceros at Su Fossu de Cannas in Sardinia being over 450,000 years in age. Other early remains of the genus in Sardinia are referred to the species P. sardus/sardous. The oldest remains assigned to P. cazioti date to approximately 300,000 years ago. P. cazioti is smaller than P. sardus, being slightly larger than a fallow deer, with an estimated body mass of around 70–90 kilograms (150–200 lb), exhibiting an over 75% size reduction from its presumed mainland ancestor Praemegaceros solilhacus, an example of insular dwarfism. The cranial morphology appears to be unaffected by the insular dwarfism. Two chronologically separated subspecies are known, which are suggested to be chronospecies. P. cazioti cazioti dates to the late Middle Pleistocene and Late Pleistocene and is characterised by smaller brachyodont teeth and P. cazioti algarensis from the end of the Late Pleistocene is larger than P. cazioti cazioti and is characterised by large mesodont upper cheek teeth, and a long premolar series, which are suggested to be adaptions for a grazing diet. The youngest date for P. cazioti is around 5500 BCE, making it the latest surviving Praemegaceros species.

=== Subgenus Praemegaceros ===
==== Praemegaceros obscurus ====
Known from the late Villafranchian of Europe (including Central Italy, Central Romania and Moldova) and the Near East, extending from the Cromer Forest Bed in England to Ubeidiya, Israel, Dmanisi, Georgia and the Azov region, Russia. Croitor suggests an origin in South Asia for this species, descended from taxa possibly referrable to Panolia sp. from the Siwaliks. Estimated body mass of around 400 kilograms (880 lb).

==== Praemegaceros dawkinsi ====
Named in 1882 from remains from the Middle Pleistocene Cromer Forest Bed in Norfolk by Edwin Tulley Newton which were originally described in 1872 as belonging to P. verticornis by William Boyd Dawkins. The body mass is estimated to be around 220 kilograms (490 lb), with a mesodont dentition. Croitor suggests that because the pedicles (base of the antlers) are robust and similar to those of giant deer, that P. dawkinsi represents a dwarfed form. The species is considered to be endemic to Britain, with the antler morphology simplified relative to other Praemegaceros species. One of the latest records of the species is from the Boxgrove Palaeolithic site. The species is thought to have gone extinct during Marine Isotope Stage 12 (Anglian Glaciation), around 475-425,000 years ago.^{307}

==== Praemegaceros mosbachensis ====
Named by Wolfgang Soergel in 1927 for the species found in the lowest level of the Middle Pleistocene Mosbach locality in Germany. It was included in the “verticornis” group of Azzaroli's 1953 classification. It has been suggested to a be synonym of P. verticornis. However, Croitor suggests that these similarities are the result of parallel evolution, and proposes that P. mosbachensis represents an intermediate form between P. obscurus and P. dawkinsi.

== Ecology ==
During the Early-Middle Pleistocene, mainland species of Praemegaceros are suggested to have been preyed upon by the sabertooth cats Megantereon and Homotherium, and the "European jaguar" Panthera gombaszogensis. Other species present alongside Praemegaceros in the late Early Pleistocene of Europe include the giant hyena Pachycrocuta, the deer Pseudodama and Eucladoceros, the rhinoceros Stephanorhinus, the mammoth Mammuthus meridionalis, the hippo Hippopotamus antiquus, the equines Equus suessenbornensis and Equus altidens.

On Corsica-Sardinia, the Praemegaceros sardous–Praemegaceros cazioti lineage lived in a highly endemic island fauna with no large terrestrial predators, also including the dwarf mammoth Mammuthus lamarmorai, the Sardinian dhole (a small canid), the Sardinian pika, the mustelid Enhydrictis, several otters (Algarolutra majori, Sardolutra ichnusae, and the giant Megalenhydris barbaricina), the vole Microtus henseli,the shrew Asoriculus similis, a mole (Talpa tyrrhenica), and the Tyrrhenian field rat.

== Relationship with humans ==
At the Fuente Nueva 3 site in southern Spain, dating to around 1.4 million years ago, bones of P. verticornis show marks indicating butchery by archaic humans. It is unclear whether this is from scavenging or hunting. At the later Boxgrove site in England, dating to around 480,000 years ago, teeth of P. cf. verticornis have cut marks, suggested to have been made by archaic humans (probably "Boxgrove Man", which has been found at the same site). These are thought to have been made as part of the butchery of the head, including to remove the lower jaw.^{410} At the same site, there is evidence for the shed antlers of P. dawkinsi being modified to be used as tools, perhaps "soft hammers" to work stone.^{395}
