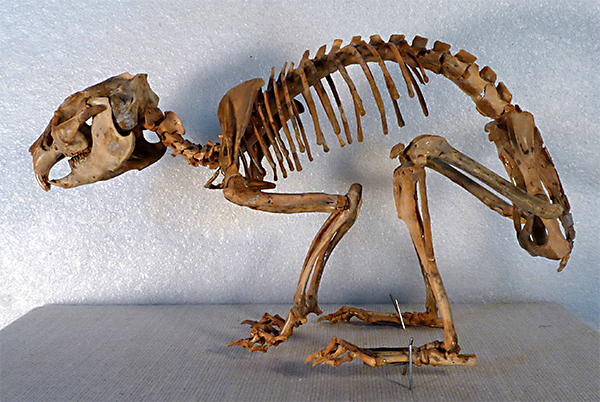
- Skeleton
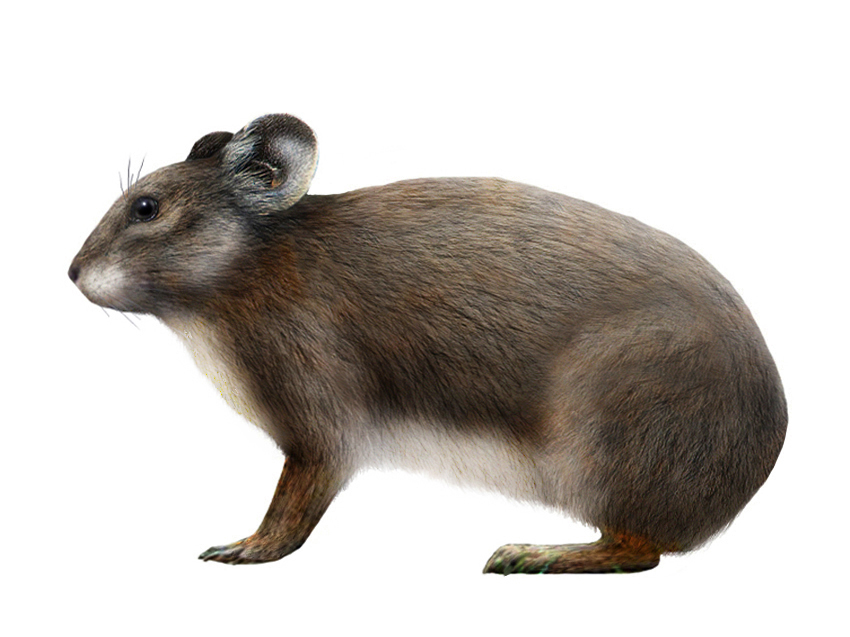
- Life restoration

Conservation status
- Extinct (IUCN 3.1)

Scientific classification
- Kingdom: Animalia
- Phylum: Chordata
- Class: Mammalia
- Infraclass: Placentalia
- Order: Lagomorpha
- Family: †Prolagidae
- Genus: †Prolagus
- Species: †P. sardus

Binomial name
- †Prolagus sardus (Wagner, 1829)

Synonyms
- Prolagus corsicanus

= Sardinian pika =

Sardinian pika Temporal range: Middle Pleistocene - Holocene 0.8–0.0002 Ma

Extinct species of mammal

The Sardinian pika (Prolagus sardus) is an extinct species of lagomorph that was endemic to the Corsica-Sardinia archipelago in the Western Mediterranean. It was the last surviving member of Prolagus, a genus of lagomorph with a fossil record spanning 20 million years once widespread throughout Europe during the Miocene and Pliocene epochs. Its closest living relatives are modern pikas (which all belong to the genus Ochotona), from which it is estimated to have diverged around 30 million years ago.

The abundance of remains suggests that the species was once common on the islands, probably forming a main prey item of the extinct Sardinian dhole. Evidence has been found indicating Sardinian pikas were consumed as food by the island's early inhabitants following human colonisation of the islands around 10,000 years ago. The species likely became extinct during the Roman occupation of the islands (sometime between around 400 BC to 600 AD) probably due to the introduction of invasive species, though it has been suggested that it may have survived until the 18th century on the island of Tavolara based on a written account, but this has alternately been argued to refer to brown rats.

== Anatomy ==
The full skeletal structure of the Sardinian pika was reconstructed in 1967, thanks to the numerous finds of bones in Corbeddu Cave, which is near Oliena, Sardinia. Some years later, from these remains, the same researchers led by the American paleontologist Mary R. Dawson were able to create a plaster reconstruction with good accuracy, and provide a thorough description of the skeleton's morphology published in 1969. The Sardinian pika was probably much stockier and more robust than extant species of pikas, and it probably resembled a sort of cross between a large wild rabbit and a pika. The first articulated skeletons of P. sardus were reported in 2016.

Prolagus sardus weighed about 504–525 g (17.8–18.5 oz). This is more than its ancestor Prolagus figaro, which is the only other member of Prolagus that was found in Sardinia and weighed about 398–436 g (14.0–15.4 oz), and is larger than most mainland species of Prolagus.

Compared to mainland species of Prolagus, P. sardus had larger and more hypsodont (high crowned) teeth. The Sardinian pika experienced anagenic evolution, with an increasing body size and shifting dental morphology over time.

== Ecology ==
Abundant fossil and subfossil remains of P. sardus are known from several localities across Corsica and Sardinia hint at the once broad geographical range of this Prolagus species: it lived from sea level up to at least 800 m (2,624 ft.) in a variety of habitats (grasslands, shrublands). Its morphology suggests that it was capable of traversing rocky terrain, and was probably a proficient jumper and capable of digging, but was not adapted for running. The tooth hypsodonty has been suggested to have been an adaptation to an abrasive diet. The abundance of mass accumulations of broken bones (bone beds) suggest that the population density was high. A sample of Late Pleistocene specimens from Medusa Cave, Sardinia found that they had a high incidience rate of arthritis relative to extant lagomorphs. This is suggested to be the result of ageing due to having a longer lifespan than mainland lagomorphs. Skeletochronology suggests that individuals of Prolagus sardus reached a lifespan of approximately 8 years, which is longer than mainland lagomorphs of equivalent size.

During the Pleistocene, the Sardinian pika lived as part of a highly endemic island ecosystem where only a small number (~12) of terrestrial mammal were present, including the dwarf mammoth Mammuthus lamarmorai, the medium-sized deer Praemegaceros cazioti the shrew Asoriculus similis, the field-rat Rhagamys orthodon, the vole Microtus (Tyrrhenicola) henseli, the mole Talpa tyrrhenica and three species of otters (Algarolutra, Sardolutra and the giant Megalenhydris). The Sardinian pika was likely preyed on by the two native species of terrestrial carnivores, a canine (the Sardinian dhole), and a mustelid (Enhydrictis galictoides) which were specialized for hunting small prey. Other likely predators include birds of prey such as the endemic owl species Bubo insularis.

== Evolution and extinction ==
The taxonomy of Prolagus has been the subject of controversy. It is either considered a member of the family Ochotonidae, which includes living pikas (which all belong to the genus Ochotona), or the only member of the family Prolagidae. A partial mitochondrial genome from Prolagus sardus suggests that Prolagus is more closely related to living pikas than to Leporidae, which contains rabbits and hares, with an estimated divergence between living pikas and Prolagus about 30 million years ago.

- Glires
  - Rodentia
  - Lagomorpha
    - Leporidae (rabbits and hares)
    - - †Prolagus
      - Ochotona (living pikas)

The earliest species of Prolagus appeared in Europe during the Early Miocene, around 20 million years ago. The ancestor of the Sardinian pika, Prolagus figaro, arrived in the Corsican-Sardinian microcontinent at the early-late Pliocene boundary around 3.6 million years ago, likely due to an emergent land connection with Italy caused by a sea level drop. Amongst mainland species, the P. figaro-P. sardus lineage was previously thought to be most closely related to the species P. depereti known from the Pliocene of France, which was originally described as a subspecies of P. figaro. However, the oldest known remains of Prolagus from Sardinia, referred to as P. aff. figaro, show closer affinities to the species P. sorbinii, a species of Eastern European origin, which expanded westwards during the Messinian, the last stage of the Miocene, with well known remains from central Italy from the latest Miocene and early Pliocene. The oldest unambiguous remains of Prolagus sardus date back from the Middle Pleistocene, a time when both islands were periodically connected due to sea level changes. Reassessment of palaeontological data has shown that the distinction made by early authors between two contemporaneous taxa (P. sardus and P. corsicanus) is probably unfounded, as the Sardinian pika exhibits only subtle anagenetic evolution of its anatomy and body size through time.

Humans first arrived in Corsica-Sardinia around 10,000 years Before Present (BP). The presence of Prolagus facilitated the establishment of the first human communities of the islands. Jean-Denis Vigne found clear evidence that the Sardinian pika was hunted and eaten by people. He found that many of the Sardinian pikas' limb bones were broken and burnt at one end, suggesting that this animal had been roasted and eaten by the Neolithic colonists of Corsica.

The Sardinian pika became extinct in Sardinia sometime after 810 BC (based on radiocarbon dating), with records from Corsica suggesting that species survived there until sometime between 393 BC and the 6th century AD (overlapping with the period of Carthaginian and Roman Corsica). Its extinction was possibly due to agricultural practices, the introduction of predators (dogs, cats and small mustelids) and ecological competitors (rodents, rabbits and hares). Transmission of pathogens by rabbits and hares introduced to Sardinia and Corsica by the Romans may have also played a role in the species's extinction. Other endemic small mammals like the shrew Asoriculus similis, the Tyrrhenian field rat, and the Tyrrhenian vole, probably also disappeared from Corsica and Sardinia around the same time.

== Potential historical references ==
The 2nd century BCE Greek historian Polybius described in The Histories the presence of an animal in Corsica locally called the kyniklos which "when seen from a distance looks like a small hare, but when captured it differs much from a hare in appearance and taste" and which "lives for the most part under the ground". This animal may have been the Sardinian pika, because Corsica at that time was not characterized by the occurrence of any species of hare.

Survival of the Sardinian pika up into modern history has been hypothesised from the description of unknown mammals by later Sardinian authors; however, this interpretation remains dubious owing to anatomical discrepancies. In 1774, Francesco Cetti wrote that the island of Tavolara off the coast of Sardinia had "giant rats whose burrows are so abundant that one might think the surface of the soil had been recently turned over by pigs", which has often been taken as a reference to the Sardinian pika. However, this was questioned by Barbara Wilkens in a 2000 publication, who suggested that it was more likely that the animals mentioned by Cetti were brown rats.
