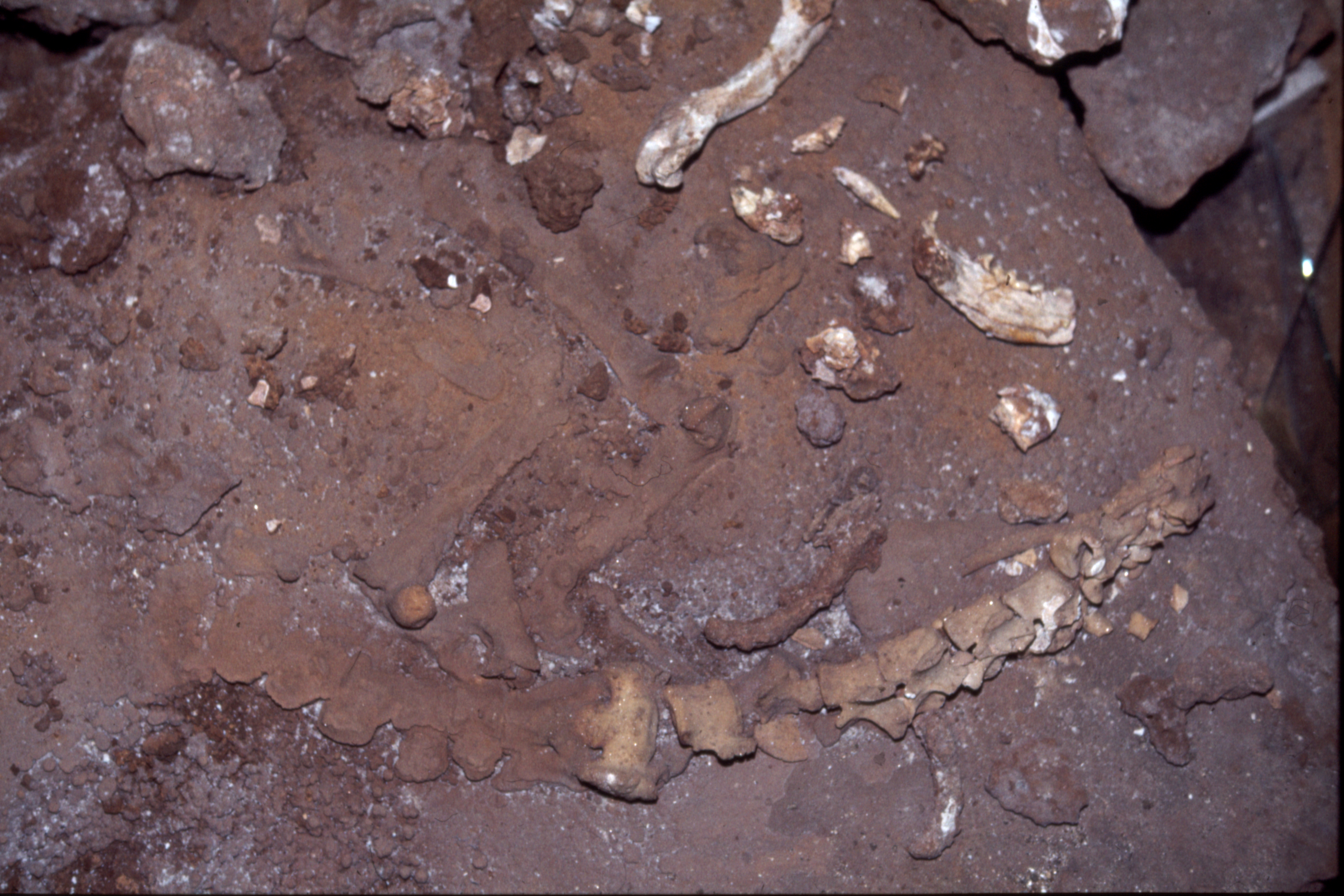
- The holotype (name-bearing) specimen in situ.

Scientific classification
- Kingdom: Animalia
- Phylum: Chordata
- Class: Mammalia
- Order: Carnivora
- Family: Mustelidae
- Subfamily: Lutrinae
- Genus: †Megalenhydris; Willemsen & Maletesta, 1987

Type species
- Megalenhydris barbaricina Willemsen & Maletesta, 1987

= Megalenhydris =

Megalenhydris Temporal range: Pleistocene, 68050-8050 BCE 0.068050–0.008050 Ma

Extinct genus of giant otter

Megalenhydris barbaricina is an extinct species of giant otter from the Late Pleistocene of Sardinia. It is known from a single partial skeleton, discovered in the Grotta di Ispinigoli near Dorgali, and was described in 1987. It was larger than any living otter, exceeding the size of South American giant otters (Pteronura), which can reach two meters in length. The species is the largest of four extinct otter species from Sardinia and Corsica. The others are Algarolutra majori, Lutra castiglionis and Sardolutra ichnusae. It is suggested to have ultimately originated from the much smaller European mainland species "Lutra" simplicidens, which may be more closely related to Lutrogale than to modern Lutra species. The structure of the teeth points to a diet of bottom dwelling fish and crustaceans. A special characteristic of the species is the flattening of the first few caudal vertebrae (the remainder of the caudal vertebrae are not known). This might point to a slightly flattened tail.

== Paleoenvironment ==
During the Middle-Late Pleistocene Corsica and Sardinia had their own highly endemic depauperate terrestrial mammal fauna which besides Megalenhydris included the Tyrrhenian field rat (Rhagamys orthodon), the Tyrrhenian vole (Microtus henseli), the Sardinian pika (Prolagus sardus), a shrew (Asoriculus similis), a mole (Talpa tyrrhenica), a dwarf mammoth (Mammuthus lamarmorai), the Sardinian dhole (Cynotherium sardous), a galictine mustelid (Enhydrictis galictoides), two other species of otter (Algarolutra majori and Sardolutra ichnusae) and a deer (Praemegaceros cazioti).
