= Cyrnaonyx =

Cyrnaonyx Temporal range: Pleistocene

Scientific classification
- Domain: Eukaryota
- Kingdom: Animalia
- Phylum: Chordata
- Class: Mammalia
- Order: Carnivora
- Family: Mustelidae
- Genus: †Cyrnaonyx; Helbing, 1935
- Species: †C. antiqua

Binomial name
- †Cyrnaonyx antiqua (de Blainville, 1841)

Extinct genus of carnivores

Cyrnaonyx is an extinct genus of Lutrinae, otters from the Pleistocene. It was originally described by Helbing based on materials from France and he also attributed material from Corsica to it. The latter appeared to belong to another species and genus, Algarolutra majori. The only species of Cyrnaonyx is C. antiqua. It is known from the Pleistocene (Holsteinian to Eemian/Weichselian) of Europe: France, Germany, Netherlands, Southern England and probably Italy.

The dentition is more robust than in the common otter Lutra and the diet probably consisted of more crustaceans and less fish, like in modern Aonyx. The skull was however not arched as in the latter which points to a more aquatic, swimming behaviour.

== Sources ==
- Malatesta, A. & Willemsen, G. F.: Algarolutra g.n. established for a fossil otter of the Sardinia island. Geologica Romana 25: 285-286 (1986)
- Willemsen, G. F.: A revision of the Pliocene and Quaternary Lutrinae from Europe. Scripta Geologica vol 101 (1992).
