= Teruelictis =

Teruelictis Temporal range: Late Miocene (10 MYA)

Scientific classification
- Domain: Eukaryota
- Kingdom: Animalia
- Phylum: Chordata
- Class: Mammalia
- Order: Carnivora
- Family: Mustelidae
- Genus: †Teruelictis; Salesa, 2013
- Species: †T. riparius

Binomial name
- †Teruelictis riparius Salesa, 2013

Extinct genus of carnivores

Teruelictis riparius is an extinct mammalian carnivoran, belonging to the family Mustelidae and was probably related to otters. The animal lived in the Upper Miocene and its fossils have been found in Spain. The animal was probably a terrestrial predator.

The animal is about 60 centimeters long and its dentition is very otter-like. However, the animal does not appear to have been semi-aquatic. Its skeleton was slender and long-legged, unlike that of otters. These conflicting features suggest that the evolutionairy line of otters originated in the Miocene (or even the lower Oligocene) and that the dental morphology of otters developed before the other characteristics of the skeleton did.
