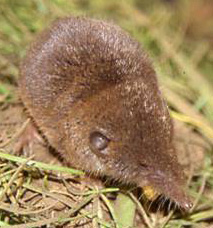

Conservation status
- Least Concern (IUCN 3.1)

Scientific classification
- Kingdom: Animalia
- Phylum: Chordata
- Class: Mammalia
- Order: Eulipotyphla
- Family: Soricidae
- Genus: Crocidura
- Species: C. pachyura

Binomial name
- Crocidura pachyura Küster, 1835
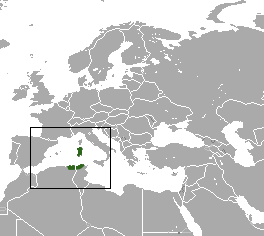
- North African white-toothed shrew range

Synonyms
- Crocidura cossyrensis Contoli, 1989; Crocidura ichnusae Festa, 1912

= North African white-toothed shrew =

Species of mammal

The North African white-toothed shrew (Crocidura pachyura) is a species of mammal in the family Soricidae. It is found on the islands of Ibiza, Sardinia, and Pantelleria in the Mediterranean Sea, in northern Algeria, and in northern Tunisia.
