= Lutra euxena =

Lutra euxena Temporal range: 2.588 to 0.012 Ma

Scientific classification
- Kingdom: Animalia
- Phylum: Chordata
- Class: Mammalia
- Order: Carnivora
- Family: Mustelidae
- Genus: Lutra
- Species: †L. euxena

Binomial name
- †Lutra euxena (Bate 1935)

Synonyms
- †Nesolutra euxena Bate 1935

Extinct species of otter

Lutra euxena is an extinct species of otter that was endemic to Malta. Initially described under the genus Nesolutra by Dorothea Bate in 1835, it was reclassified to the current taxon in 1992. It inhabited the island during the middle to late Pleistocene era between 2.588 and 0.012 million years ago. The species likely crossed over from the mainland and later adopted a land based lifestyle in the islands. The otters likely went extinct because of the activity of early humans.

== Taxonomy ==
Lutra euxena is classified under the otter family Mustelidae. It was named as Nesolutra euxena by Dorothea Bate in 1935, and was recombined as Lutra euxena by Willemsen in 1992. As per Willemsen, Lutra simplicidens was a common ancestor to many of the otters from the Pleistocene and Holocene era that were endemic to the Mediterranean islands.

== Distribution ==
Lutra euxena was endemic to Malta and lived the middle to late Pleistocene era between 2.588 and 0.012 million years ago. It likely went extinct because of human activity.

== Morphology ==
Lutra euxena is described as relatively similar in size to other otters found in the Mediterranean region. The species had strong forelimbs, evident from well developed grooves and lateral development of the muscles from fossilized specimens. It probably colonized the islands of Malta by crossing the sea channels from the mainland. Later these otters adopted a land-based lifestyle, as there were few large mammals inhabiting the islands. The otters consumed small mammals on the islands alongside fish and shellfish.
