= Lutra castiglionis =

Lutra castiglionis Temporal range: Mid Pleistocene

Scientific classification
- Kingdom: Animalia
- Phylum: Chordata
- Class: Mammalia
- Infraclass: Placentalia
- Order: Carnivora
- Family: Mustelidae
- Genus: Lutra
- Species: †L. castiglionis

Binomial name
- †Lutra castiglionis (Pereira & Salotti, 2000)

Synonyms
- Cyrnolutra castiglionis

Extinct species of otter

Lutra castiglionis, the Castiglione otter or Corsican otter, is an extinct species of otter that was endemic to Corsica during the Pleistocene.

== Taxonomy ==
Lutra castiglionis was described in 2000, originally under a new genus, Cyrnolutra. In 2006, it was transferred into the genus Lutra. A possible ancestor of this species is Lutra simplicidens, known from mainland Europe.

== Description ==
The Castiglione otter was probably very well adapted to a riverine aquatic way of life. Remains show a flattening of the sacrum, indicating it had a much stronger tail than most other otters, which would allow it to propel itself more efficiently in aquatic environments.

Remains of the Castiglione otter are known from Castiglione Cave in Corsica. These fossils have been dated to the Mid Pleistocene, approximately 157,500 BP (+22,200/-17,300).
