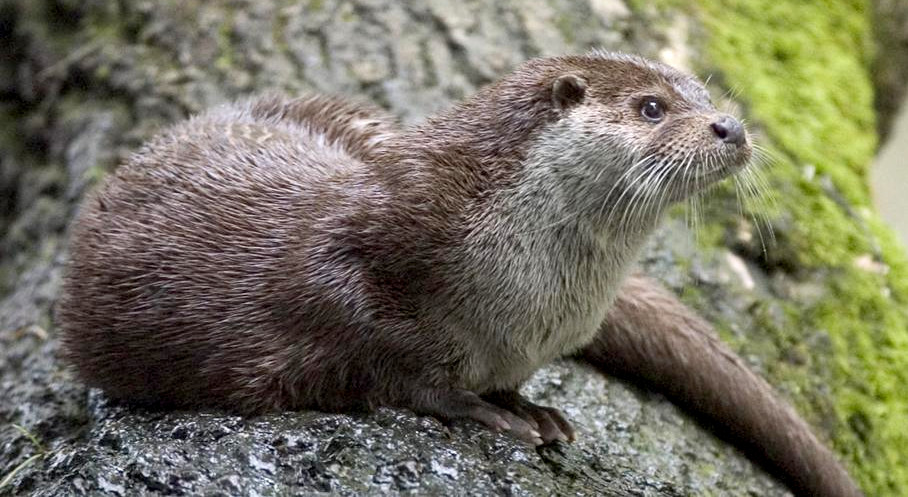
- Eurasian otter (Lutra lutra)

Scientific classification
- Kingdom: Animalia
- Phylum: Chordata
- Class: Mammalia
- Infraclass: Placentalia
- Order: Carnivora
- Family: Mustelidae
- Subfamily: Lutrinae; Bonaparte, 1838

Type genus
- Lutra Brünnich, 1771

Genera
- Aonyx; Enhydra; Hydrictis; Lontra; Lutra; Lutrogale; Pteronura; †Enhydriodon; †Algarolutra; †Cyrnaonyx; †Megalenhydris; †Sardolutra; †Siamogale; †Teruelictis; †Satherium; †Enhydritherium

= Otter =

Otter Temporal range: Middle Miocene to present

Subfamily of mammals (Lutrinae)

Otters are carnivorous mammals in the subfamily Lutrinae. The 14 extant otter species are all semiaquatic, both freshwater and marine. Lutrinae is a branch of the Mustelidae family, which includes weasels, badgers, mink, and wolverines, among other animals.

Otters are distinguished by their long, slim bodies, powerful webbed feet for swimming, and their dense fur, which keeps them warm and buoyant in water. They are playful animals, engaging in activities like sliding into water on natural slides and playing with stones.

Otters exhibit a varied life cycle with a gestation period of about 60–86 days, and offspring typically stay with their family for a year. They can live up to 16 years, with their diet mainly consisting of fish and sometimes frogs, birds, or shellfish, depending on the species.

There are 14 known species of otters, ranging in size and habitat preferences, with some species adapted to cold waters requiring a high metabolic rate for warmth. Otter-human interactions have varied over time, with otters being hunted for their pelts, used in fishing practices in southern Bangladesh, and occasionally attacking humans, though such incidents are rare and often a result of provocation. Otters hold a place in various cultures' mythology and religion, symbolizing different attributes and stories, from Norse mythology to Native American totems and Asian folklore, where they are sometimes believed to possess shapeshifting abilities.

== Etymology ==
The word otter derives from the Old English word otor or oter. This and cognate words in other Indo-European languages ultimately stem from the Proto-Indo-European word *wódr̥, which also gave rise to the English word "water".

== Life cycle ==
A sea otter playing in captivity.

The gestation period in otters is about 60 to 86 days. The newborn pup is cared for by the female, male, and older offspring. Females reach sexual maturity at approximately two years of age, and males at approximately three years. The den or "holt" is built under tree roots or a rocky cairn, more common in Scotland. It is lined with moss and grass.

After one month, the pup can leave the den, and after two months, it can swim. The pup lives with its family for approximately one year. Otters live up to 16 years; they are by nature playful and frolic in the water with their pups. Its usual food is fish, and further downriver, eels, but it may also sample frogs and birds.

== Description ==
Otters have long, slim bodies and relatively short limbs. Their most striking anatomical features are the powerful webbed feet used to swim, and their seal-like abilities for holding breath underwater. Most have sharp claws on their feet and all except the sea otter have long, muscular tails. The 13 species range in adult size from 0.6 to 1.8 m (2.0 to 5.9 ft) in length and 1 to 45 kg (2.2 to 99.2 lb) in weight. The Asian small-clawed otter is the smallest otter species and the giant otter and sea otter are the largest. They have very soft, insulated underfur, which is protected by an outer layer of long guard hairs. This traps a layer of air which keeps them dry, warm, and somewhat buoyant under water.

Several otter species live in cold waters and have high metabolic rates to help keep them warm. Eurasian otters must eat 15% of their body weight each day, and sea otters 20 to 25%, depending on the temperature. In water as warm as 10 °C (50 °F), an otter needs to catch 100 g (3.5 oz) of fish per hour to survive. Most species hunt for three to five hours each day and nursing mothers up to eight hours each day.

== Feeding ==
For most otters, fish is the staple of their diet. This is often supplemented by frogs, crayfish and crabs. Some otters are experts at opening shellfish, and others will feed on available small mammals or birds. Prey-dependence leaves otters very vulnerable to prey depletion. Sea otters are hunters of clams, sea urchins and other shelled creatures. They are notable for their ability to use stones to break open shellfish on their bellies. This skill must be learned by the young.

Otters are active hunters, chasing prey in the water or searching the beds of rivers, lakes or the seas. Most species live beside water, but river otters usually enter it only to hunt or travel, otherwise spending much of their time on land to prevent their fur becoming waterlogged. Sea otters are considerably more aquatic and live in the ocean for most of their lives.

== Behaviour ==
Otters are playful animals and appear to engage in various behaviors for sheer enjoyment, such as making waterslides and sliding on them into the water. They may also find and play with small stones.

In 1990, an otter was observed belly-sliding in Singapore, likely as a form of amusement.

Different species vary in their social structure, some being largely solitary, while others live in groups – in a few species these groups may be fairly large.

== Species ==
The 13 species of otter form the subfamily Lutrinae, which is part of the Mustelidae family, which also includes badgers, weasels, martens, and minks. They are closely related to the Mustelinae subfamily, which shares their elongated body shape, which is helpful for living in water.

The first genus of otter, Mionictis, evolved in the Early Miocene from badgers that adapted to semi-aquatic life.

- Lutrinae
  - Giant otter (Pteronura brasiliensis)
  - - - North American river otter (Lontra canadensis)
      - - - Marine otter (Lontra felina)
          - Southern river otter (Lontra provocax)
        - - Neotropical otter (Lontra longicaudis)
          - Mesoamerican otter (Lontra annectens)
    - - Sea otter (Enhydra lutris)
      - Spotted-necked otter (Hydrictis maculicollis)
      - - - Eurasian otter (Lutra lutra)
          - Hairy-nosed otter (Lutra sumatrana)
          - Japanese otter† (Lutra nippon)
          - Lutra euxena†
          - Lutra castiglionis†
          - Lutra simplicidens†
          - Lutra trinacriae†
        - - - African clawless otter (Aonyx capensis)
            - Asian small-clawed otter (Aonyx cinerea)
            - Congo clawless otter (Aonyx congicus)
          - - Smooth-coated otter (Lutrogale perspicillata)

Cladogram, after Koepfli et al. 2008, Bininda-Emonds et al. 1999, and de Ferran et al. 2024

=== Extant species ===
Image	Genus	Species
	Lutra Brisson, 1762	Eurasian otter (Lutra lutra); Hairy-nosed otter (Lutra sumatrana)
	Hydrictis Pocock, 1921	Spotted-necked otter (Hydrictis maculicollis)
	Lutrogale (Gray, 1865)	Smooth-coated otter (Lutrogale perspicillata)
	Lontra Gray, 1843	North American river otter (Lontra canadensis); Southern river otter (Lontra provocax); Neotropical otter (Lontra longicaudis); Mesoamerican otter (Lontra annectens); Marine otter (Lontra felina)
	Pteronura Gray, 1837	Giant otter (Pteronura brasiliensis)
	Aonyx Lesson, 1827	African clawless otter (Aonyx capensis); Asian small-clawed otter (Aonyx cinereus); Congo clawless otter (Aonyx congicus)
	Enhydra Fleming, 1828	Sea otter (Enhydra lutris)

=== Extinct taxa ===
Subfamily Lutrinae

- Genus Lutra
  - †Lutra castiglionis – Corsica, Pleistocene
  - †Lutra euxena – Malta, Pleistocene
  - †Japanese otter (Lutra nippon) – Japan, extinct c. 1979
- Genus Lutrogale
  - †Lutrogale cretensis
- Genus Enhydra
  - †Enhydra macrodonta
  - †Enhydra reevei
- Genus †Algarolutra – Corsica and Sardinia, Pleistocene
- Genus †Cyrnaonyx – Europe, Pleistocene
- Genus †Enhydriodon – Asia and Africa, Late Miocene to Early Pleistocene
- Genus †Enhydritherium – North America, Late Miocene to Early Pliocene
- Genus †Lutraeximia – Italy, Pleistocene
- Genus †Limnonyx – Germany, Late Miocene
- Genus †Megalenhydris – Sardinia, Pleistocene
- Genus †Paludolutra – Italy, Late Miocene
- Genus †Sardolutra – Sardinia, Pleistocene
- Genus †Siamogale – eastern Asia, Late Miocene to Early Pliocene
- Genus †Sivaonyx – Asia and Africa, Late Miocene to Early Pliocene
- Genus †Teruelictis – Spain, Late Miocene
- Genus †Torolutra – Africa, Pliocene
- Genus †Tyrrhenolutra – Italy, Late Miocene
- Genus †Vishnuonyx – Europe, Asia and Africa, Late Miocene to Early Pliocene

== Relation with humans ==
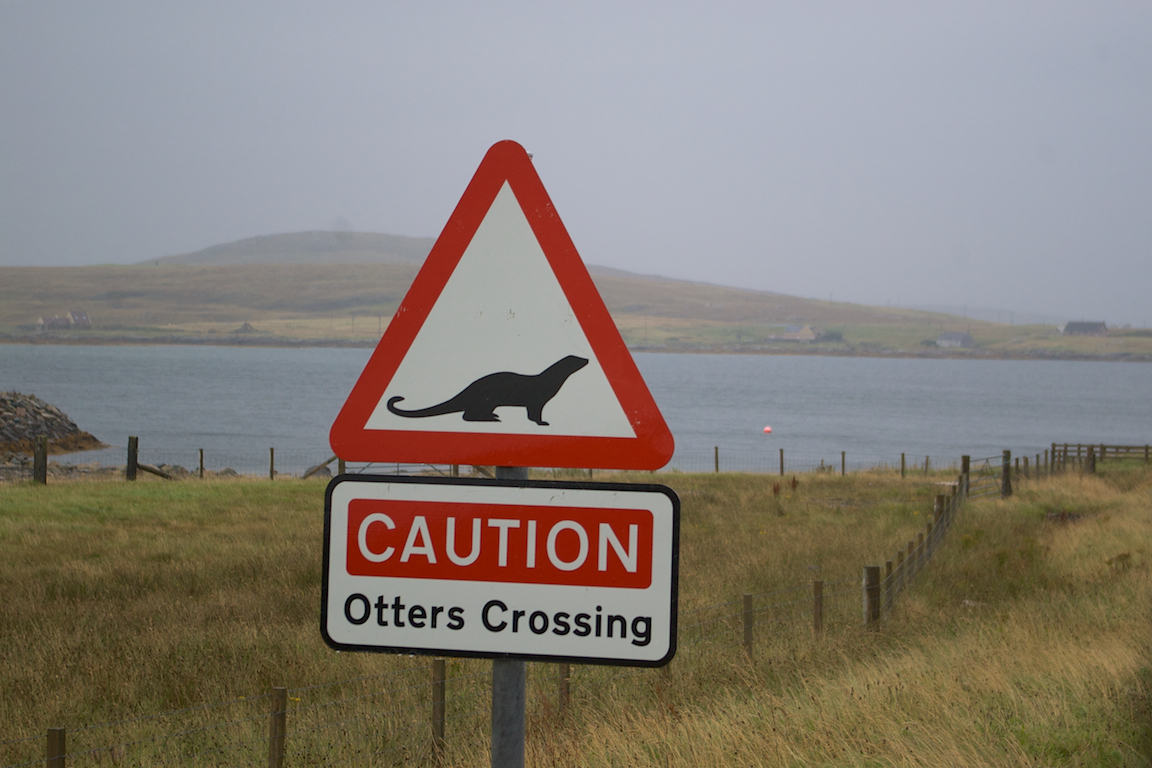
Sign warning drivers in Benbecula in the Outer Hebrides to beware of otters on the road

=== Hunting ===
Otters have been hunted for their pelts from at least the 1700s, although it may have begun well before then. Early hunting methods included darts, arrows, nets and snares but later, traps were set on land and guns used.

There has been a long history of otter pelts being worn around the world. In China it was standard for the royalty to wear robes made from them. People that were financially high in status also wore them. The tails of otters were often made into items for men to wear. These included hats and belts. Even some types of mittens for children have been made from the fur of otters.

Otters have also been hunted using dogs, especially the otterhound. From 1958 to 1963, the 11 otter hunts in England and Wales killed 1,065 otters between them. In such hunts, the hunters notched their poles after every kill. The prized trophy that hunters would take from the otters was the baculum, which would be worn as a tie-pin.

Traffic (the wildlife trade monitoring network) reported that otters are at serious risk in Southeast Asia and have disappeared from parts of their former range. This decline in populations is due to hunting to supply the demand for skins.

=== Fishing for humans ===
For many generations, fishermen in southern Bangladesh have bred smooth-coated otters and used them to chase fish into their nets. Once a widespread practice, passed down from father to son throughout many communities in Asia, this traditional use of domesticated wild animals is still in practice in the district of Narail, Bangladesh.

=== Attacks on humans ===
A 2011 review by the IUCN/SSC Otter Specialist Group showed that otter attacks reported between 1875 and 2010 occurred most often in Florida, where human and otter populations have substantially increased since 2000, with the majority involving the North American river otter. At least 42 instances of attack were found, including one resulting in death and another case of serious injury. Attacking otters had rabies in 36% of anecdotal reports. 80% of otter bite victims do not seek medical treatment.

Animal welfare groups say that, unless threatened, otters rarely attack humans. In November 2021, about 20 river otters ambushed a British man in his 60s during an early morning walk in Singapore Botanic Gardens. Despite weighing over 200 pounds, he was trampled and bitten and could not stand up without help from a nearby rescuer. The man speculated that another runner might have stepped on one of the animals earlier, and wished that there could be more lighting installed at that location.

=== Religion and mythology ===
Norse mythology tells of the dwarf Ótr habitually taking the form of an otter. The myth of "Otter's Ransom" is the starting point of the Volsunga saga.

In Irish mythology, the character Lí Ban was turned from a woman into a mermaid, half human and half salmon, and given three hundred years of life to roam the oceans. Her lapdog assumed the form of an otter and shared her prolonged lifetime and her extensive wanderings.

In some Native American cultures, otters are considered totem animals.

The otter is held to be a clean animal belonging to Ahura Mazda in Zoroastrian belief, and taboo to kill.

In popular Korean mythology, it is told that people who see an otter (soodal) will attract 'rain clouds' for the rest of their lives.

In the Buddhist Jataka tales, The Otters and The Wolf, two otters agreed to let a wolf settle their dispute in dividing their caught fish but it was taken away by the cunning wolf.

==== Japanese folklore ====
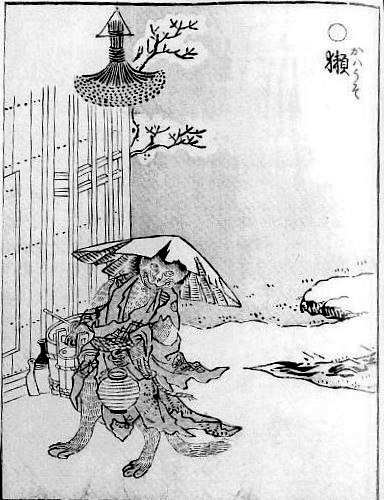
Kawauso (獺) from the Gazu Hyakki Yagyō by Sekien Toriyama

In Japanese, otters are called "kawauso" (獺、川獺). In Japanese folklore, they fool humans in the same way as foxes (kitsune) and tanuki.

In the Noto region, Ishikawa Prefecture, there are stories where they shapeshift into beautiful women or children wearing checker-patterned clothing. If a human attempts to speak to one, they will answer "oraya" and then answer "araya," and if anybody asks them anything, they say cryptic things like "kawai." There are darker stories, such as one from Kaga Province (now Ishikawa Prefecture) in which an otter that lives in the castle's moat shapeshifts into a woman, invites males, and then kills and eats them.

In the kaidan, essays, and legends of the Edo period like the "Urami Kanawa" (裏見寒話), "Taihei Hyaku Monogatari" (太平百物語), and the "Shifu Goroku" (四不語録), there are tales about strange occurrences like otters that shapeshift into beautiful women and kill men.

In the town of Numatachi, Asa District, Hiroshima Prefecture (now Hiroshima), they are called "tomo no kawauso" (伴のカワウソ) and "ato no kawauso" (阿戸のカワウソ). It is said that they shapeshift into bōzu (a kind of monk) and appear before passers-by, and if the passer-by tries to get close and look up, its height steadily increases until it becomes a large bōzu.

In the Tsugaru region, Aomori Prefecture, they are said to possess humans. It is said that those possessed by otters lose their stamina as if their soul has been extracted. They are also said to shapeshift into severed heads and get caught in fishing nets.

In the Kashima District and the Hakui District in Ishikawa Prefecture, they are seen as a yōkai under the name kabuso or kawaso. They perform pranks like extinguishing the fire of the paper lanterns of people who walk on roads at night, shapeshifting into a beautiful woman of 18 or 19 years of age and fooling people, or tricking people and making them try to engage in sumo against a rock or a tree stump. It is said that they speak human words, and sometimes people are called and stopped while walking on roads.

In the Ishikawa and Kochi Prefectures, they are said to be a type of kappa, and there are stories told about how they engage in sumo with otters. In places like the Hokuriku region, Kii, and Shikoku, the otters are seen as a type of kappa. In the Kagakushū, a dictionary from the Muromachi period, an otter that grew old becomes a kappa.

In an Ainu folktale, in Urashibetsu (in Abashiri, Hokkaido), there are stories where monster otters shapeshift into humans, go into homes where there are beautiful girls, and try to kill the girl and make her its wife.

In China, like in Japan, there are stories where otters shapeshift into beautiful women in old books like In Search of the Supernatural and the Zhenyizhi (甄異志).

== See also ==
- Reniculate kidney
