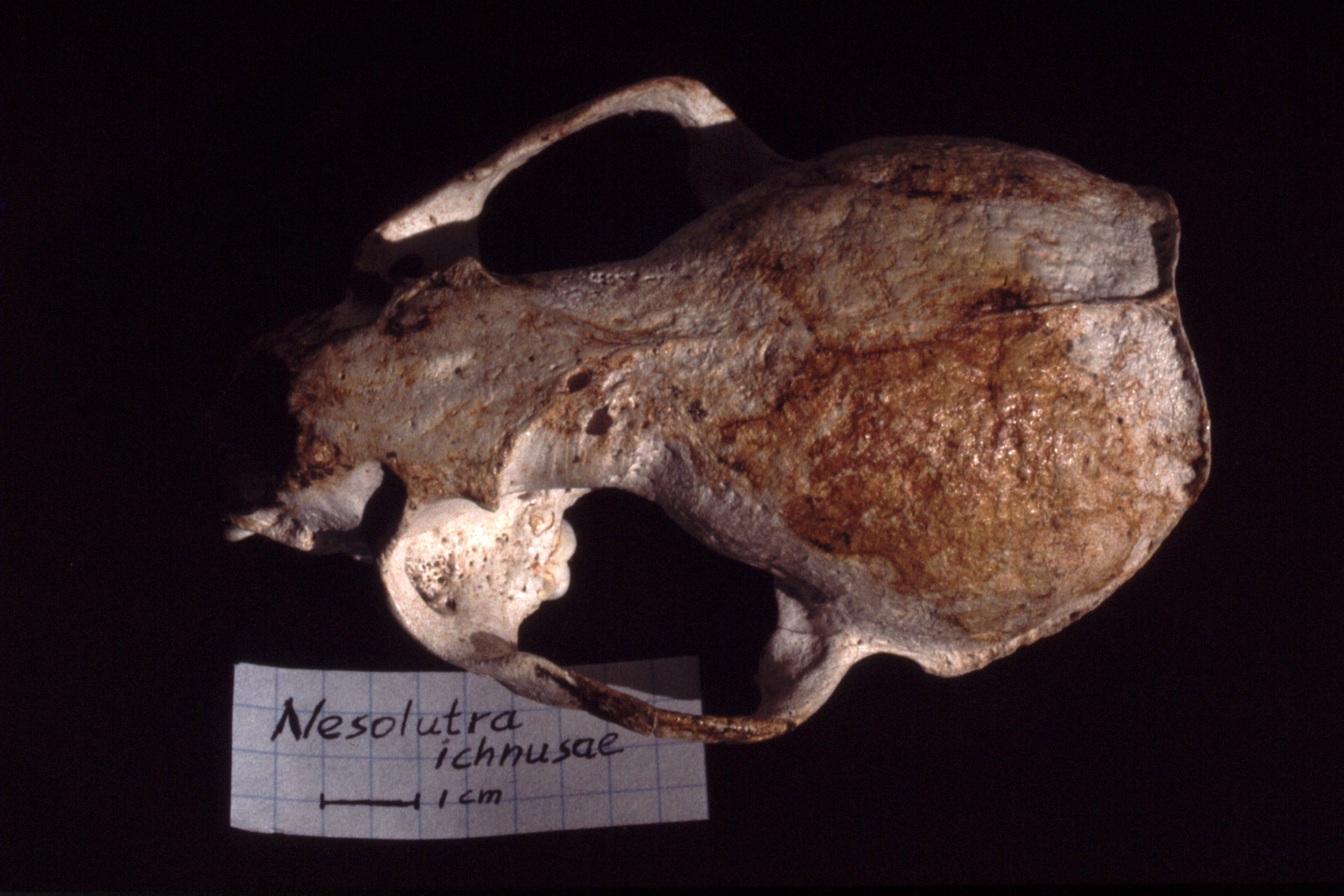
- Skull of the Sardolutra ichnusae holotype

Scientific classification
- Kingdom: Animalia
- Phylum: Chordata
- Class: Mammalia
- Infraclass: Placentalia
- Order: Carnivora
- Family: Mustelidae
- Genus: †Sardolutra; Willemsen, 1992
- Species: †S. ichnusae

Binomial name
- †Sardolutra ichnusae (Malatesta, 1977)

Synonyms
- Nesolutra ichnusae

= Sardolutra =

Sardolutra Temporal range: Late Pleistocene

Extinct genus of otter

Sardolutra ichnusae is an extinct species of otter from the Late Pleistocene of Sardinia. It was originally described as Nesolutra ichnusae. It was a rather small species of otter, probably living in the sea. Among its characteristics is a relatively very large baculum, larger than in any living otter. The species probably evolved from a species of Lutra, maybe L. castiglionis.
