= Algarolutra =

Algarolutra Temporal range: Pleistocene

Scientific classification
- Kingdom: Animalia
- Phylum: Chordata
- Class: Mammalia
- Infraclass: Placentalia
- Order: Carnivora
- Family: Mustelidae
- Genus: †Algarolutra; Malatesta & Willemsen, 1986
- Species: †A. majori

Binomial name
- †Algarolutra majori (Malatesta, 1978)

Extinct genus of carnivores

Algarolutra is an extinct endemic genus of otter from the Pleistocene of Corsica and Sardinia. The single species A. majori was originally attributed to the genus Cyrnaonyx and its type species C. antiqua, which was based on fossils from Corsica and also from mainland France. From mainland Europe, only lower dentition was known, whereas from Corsica and Sardinia only upper dentition was known. When a Cyrnaonyx antiqua fossil with both upper and lower dentition was found in England, it became clear that the species majori was too different to keep even in the same genus and the genus Algarolutra was described. appearing to belong to separate genera. A. majori is known only from very sparse evidence.

== Sources ==
- Malatesta, A. & Willemsen, G. F. 'Algarolutra g.n. established for a fossil otter of the Sardinia island'. Geologica Romana 25: 285-286 (1986)
- Willemsen, G. F., 'A revision of the Pliocene and Quaternary Lutrinae from Europe', Scripta Geologica vol. 101 (1992).
