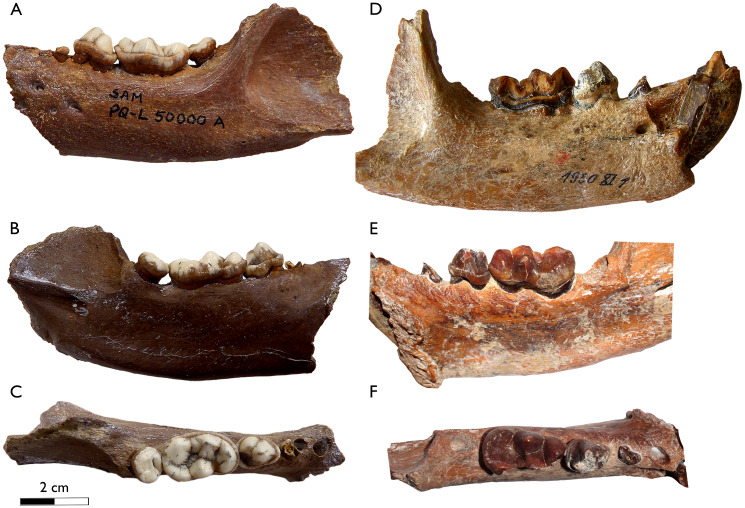
- Lower jaw dentitions of Enhydriodon hendeyi (A-C) and Enhydriodon africanus (D-F)

Scientific classification
- Kingdom: Animalia
- Phylum: Chordata
- Class: Mammalia
- Order: Carnivora
- Family: Mustelidae
- Subfamily: Lutrinae
- Tribe: †Enhydriodontini
- Genus: †Enhydriodon; Falconer, 1868

Type species
- †Enhydriodon sivalensis Falconer, 1868

Other species
- †E. africanus Stromer, 1931; †E. falconeri Pilgrim, 1931; †E? latipes Pilgrim, 1931; †E. ekecaman Werdelin, 2003; †E. hendeyi Morales, Pickford & Soria, 2005; †E. kamuhangirei Morales & Pickford, 2005; †E? soriae Morales & Pickford, 2005; †E. dikikae Geraads et al., 2011; †E. afman Werdelin & Lewis, 2013; †E. omoensis Grohé, Uno, & Boisserie, 2022

Synonyms
- Genus synonymy: Amyxodon Falconer & Cautley, 1835; Synonyms of E. sivalensis: Amyxodon sivalensis Falconer & Cautley, 1835; Synonyms of E. ekecaman: E. pattersoni Savage, 1978

= Enhydriodon =

Enhydriodon Temporal range: Late Miocene to Early Pleistocene, 10.1–1.8 Ma

Extinct genus of carnivorans

Enhydriodon is an extinct genus of otters known from Africa and South Asia that lived from the late Miocene to the early Pleistocene. It contains nine confirmed species, two debated species, and at least a few other undescribed species from Africa. The genus name means "otter tooth" in Ancient Greek and is a reference to its dentition rather than to the Enhydra genus, which includes the modern sea otter and its two prehistoric relatives. Enhydriodon belongs to the tribe Enhydriodontini (which also contains Sivaonyx and Vishnuonyx) in the otter subfamily Lutrinae.

The exact sizes and lengths of Enhydriodon species are unknown given the lack of complete fossils of it and most related fossil lutrines. Indian subcontinental species are estimated to be of weights similar to that of the extant sea otter, but African species are estimated to be heavier than extant lutrines. In particular, several species such as E. kamuhangirei, E. dikikae, and E. omoensis were estimated to weigh over 100 kg (220 lb). Given these weight estimates, the three species likely reached sizes comparable to extant bears or lions, making them the largest known mustelids to exist, although a lack of complete specimens makes precise estimates impossible.

Its advanced dentition is well-known, its broad, bunodont carnassials allowing the lutrine to consume prey by crushing them rather than shearing them like the modern sea otter and unlike most other extant otters. As such, it is grouped among the bunodont otters, a categorical term referring to fossil lutrines with non-bladelike carnassials in the premolars or molars of the Miocene to Pleistocene and the sea otter of the sole extant Enhydra genus. Its I^{3} teeth (or third incisors) are canine-like and much larger than its other incisors (although shorter than its canines), a trait not seen in extant and extinct lutrine genera. It is hypothesized that Indian species of Enhydriodon were semiaquatic and consumed bivalves because their bunodont dentitions would have allowed them to consume hard-shelled invertebrates. It is unknown whether African species were generally aquatic, semiaquatic, or terrestrial, but their potential diets suitable for bunodont dentitions include bivalves, catfish, reptiles, eggs, and carrion. E. omoensis of Ethiopia in particular could have been a terrestrial locomotor that at least semiregularly hunted or scavenged terrestrial prey with C_{4} plant diets which if true makes its behaviour unlike any extant otters. It is unknown whether the species is an outlier amongst African bunodont otter species, but it has been suggested that Enhydriodon dikikae and Sivaonyx beyi were both large terrestrial bunodont otters of Africa as well.

The taxonomic status of Enhydriodon species have been complicated by its affinities and similarities with other bunodont lutrine genera like Sivaonyx and Paludolutra up to the modern day, although Paludolutra is presently considered a distinct genus not closely related to Enhydriodon. Currently, the Enhydriodontini tribe is considered evolutionarily closer to the modern Enhydra genus than any other known bunodont otter genus that may have gained bunodont dentition as a result of parallel evolution, but the extent to which they are closely related remains unresolved.

== Taxonomy ==
=== Early history ===
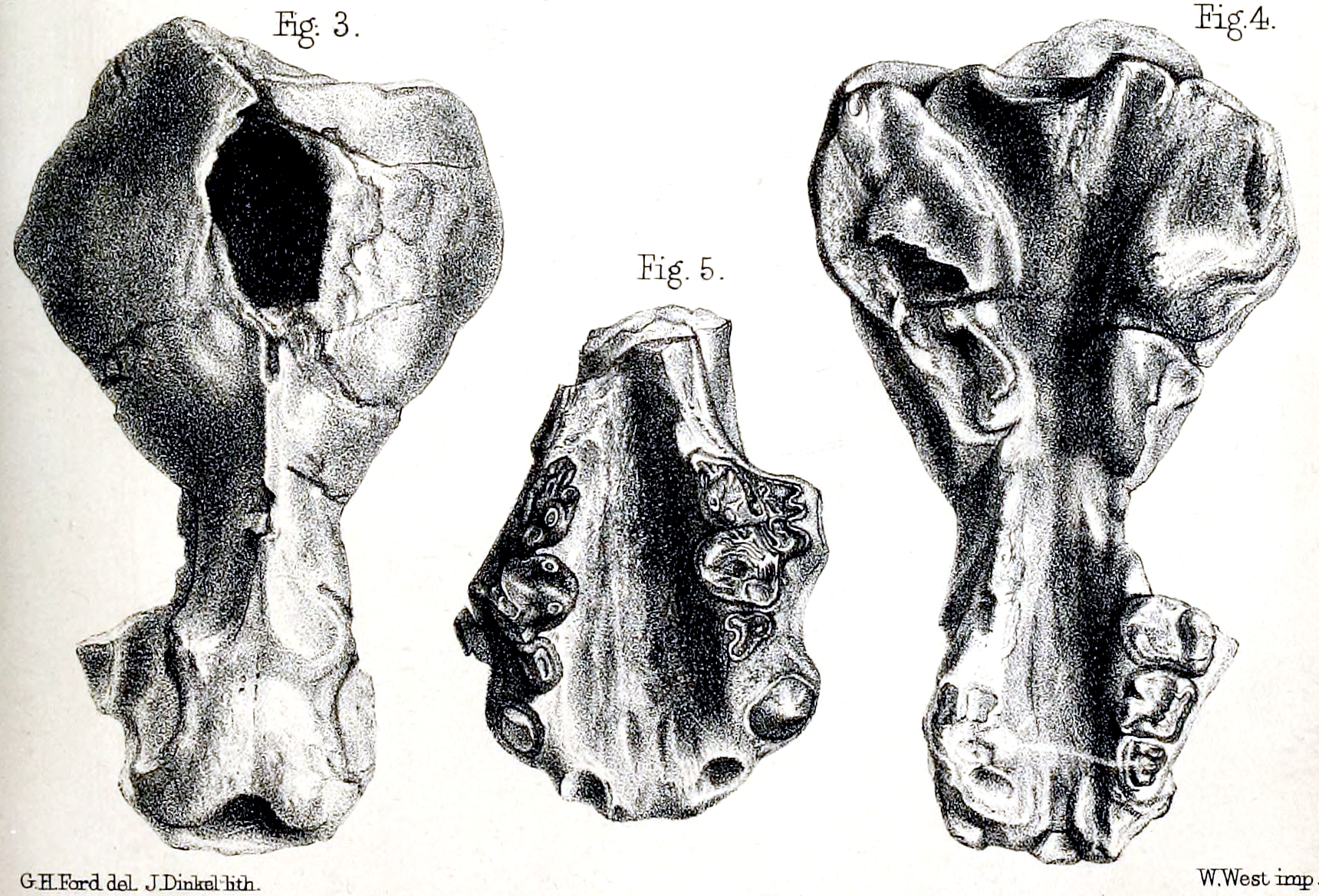
1868 Illustrations of the 2 crania of E. sivalensis (Figure 3-4 are different views of the same specimen). The drawings were based on specimens at the British Museum.

Enhydriodon was first erected in 1868 by Hugh Falconer based on several crania from Siwalik Hills, India that he attributed to E. sivalensis. He explained that the scientific name, meaning "otter tooth", is derived from the Ancient Greek terms ἐνυδρίς (otter) and ὀδούς (tooth) and is not a reference to the genus Enhydra, which includes the modern sea otter (Enhydra lutris). According to Falconer, the Siwalik Hill fossils belonging to E. sivalensis were previously classified by Falconer and Proby Cautley under the genus and species name Amyxodon sivalensis in an 1835 synopsis of the fossil genera in the Siwalik Hills that the two palaeontologists found, in which the fossil taxon was considered to be a carnivoran of an unknown family, although no holotype or diagnostic descriptions were attributed to it. As a result of the rename, Amyxodon had been considered a "dead name" or synonym of Enhydriodon despite being the older genus name. Using the available specimens of E. sivalensis, Falconer calculated that there were four premolars and molars in the species's upper jaw (the dental formula was calculated as 3.1.42.1.5), one less than in the extant genus Lutra but matching the total count of Enhydra. He described the upper carnassial of E. sivalensis as the most unique feature of its upper jaw, being nearly square and its coronal lobes being developed from conical mamelons unlike the two extant lutrine genera.

During the 19th and 20th centuries, more species of Enhydriodon such as E. campanii were introduced and more lutrine genera with bunodont dentition such as Sivaonyx and Vishnuonyx were described, creating a particularly complicated history for the earliest-described prehistoric otter genus. In 1931, Guy Pilgrim described more fossils discovered in the Siwalik Hills, including a newer species named E. falconeri. He also implied that Enhydriodon and Sivaonyx, despite their similarities, were differentiated by the structure of the maxillary 4th premolar (P^{4}) and apparent lack of the anterior upper premolar (P^{1}) that is presumed to be reflected at the bottom jaw as well (both of which are debated up to today). In the same year that E. falconeri was described, Ernst Stromer described E. africanus of the late Pliocene, its fossil teeth being located in South Africa and the first described species from the continent of Africa.

=== Perceived relationships with Paludolutra and Enhydra ===
In 1976, Charles Repenning brought about the idea that Enhydriodon was related to the extant Enhydra genus due to the supposed species of the former being an evolutionary "branch" of "crab-eating otters" in Italy, Spain, and California, eventually leading to the modern sea otter. He correctly introduced the idea that Enhydra was related to Enhydriodon given their bunodont dentitions, but the supposed European "branch" of the Enhydriodon genus was later reclassified by Johannes Hürzeler and Burkart Engesser into the newer genus Paludolutra in 1976, although it remained relatively obscure in the palaeontological record until later research revised its taxonomic state.

The taxonomies of individual lutrine species and genera continued to be revised into the 21st century as more prehistoric otter species were described while palaeontologists continually revised the fossil bunodont lutrine species to different genera. Paludolutra was originally reclassified as a subgenus of Enhydriodon by Gerard F. Willemsen in 1992. However, in January 2005, Martin Pickford and colleagues diagnosed Paludolutra as a synonym of Sivaonyx on the basis of Pilgrim's diagnosis of the latter, rejecting Willemsen's synonymy of Paludolutra to Enhydriodon. Additionally, they erected a species of Enhydriodon named E. hendeyi from the type locality of Langebaanweg, South Africa, which dates to the lower Pliocene and was named after the palaeontologist Quinton B. Hendey, who they said described the first known specimens that were since attributed to the species. In December of the same year, Jorge Morales and Pickford instead described Paludolutra as a distinct genus that might be related to Sivaonyx based on dentition convergences. In 2007, the two palaeontologists reaffirmed that the dental morphology of Paludolutra was distinct enough to be reclassified as a genus based on full generic differentiation, suggesting that the species P. campanii, P. lluecai, and P. maremmana would no longer be classified under Enhydriodon under the basis of Paludolutra being a subgenus.

=== Modern revisions of African species ===
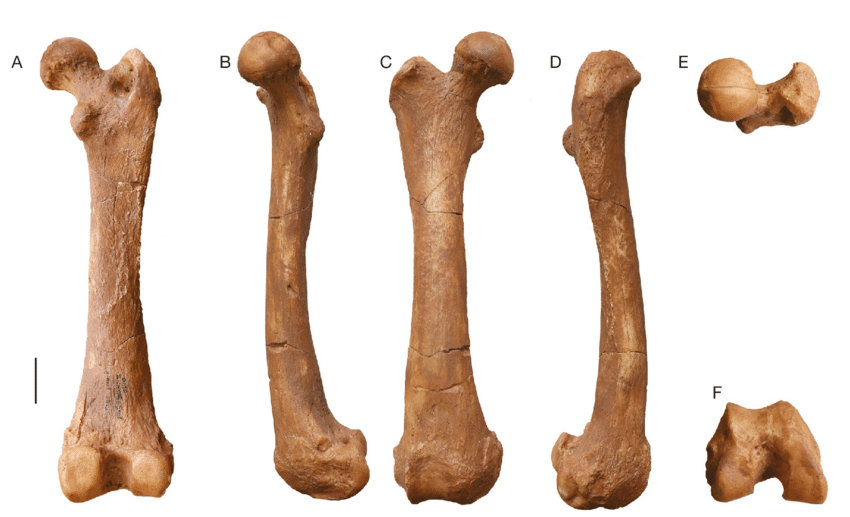
E. omoensis right femur faced at different sides

In 2003, Lars Werdelin erected the species E. ekecaman from the Kanapoi palaeontological site of the Turkana Basin in Kenya (early Pliocene, ca. 5.2-4.0 Ma), describing it as one of the earliest members of the African Enhydriodon lineage. The species was named after the Turkana language term "ekecaman", which means "fisherman" because he suggested that fish may have been a diet for the species. He also declared the species "E. pattersoni ", described by R. J. G. Savage in 1978, as a nomen nudum of E. ekecaman since no type specimen or valid diagnosis was designated to it, a view supported by Morales and Pickford in December 2005.

E. africanus, E. ekecaman, and E. hendeyi were reclassified into Sivaonyx by Pickford and Morales in December 2005, where they additionally described a new species named Sivaonyx kamuhangirei. The reclassification of African fossil bunodont otters into Sivaonyx had brought about continuous debate regarding the practicality of the differences between Enhydriodon and Sivaonyx, with some researchers claiming neutrality due to preferred focuses on researching the individual species instead of their genus placements. In 2022, the four species were eventually reclassified into Enhydriodon in a research paper by Camille Grohé et al. E. soriae was also initially sorted unto Sivaonyx but was eventually assigned to Enhydriodon, although its genus placement remains disputed. In 2005, Morales and Pickford sorted Enhydriodon into the newly created Enhydriodontini tribe, which they described as hosting genera of extinct bunodont otters from the Siwalik Hills and Africa including Vishnuonyx, Sivaonyx, and Enhydriodon. In 2007, Pickford synonymized the species "E. aethiopicus ", previously described by Denis Geraads et al. in 2004, to Pseudocivetta ingens, an extinct member of the Viverridae family. In 2017, Enhydra was explicitly excluded from the Enhydriodontini tribe despite its similarities, and Paludolutra was reclassified as a sister taxon to the tribe.

In 2011, Denis Geraads and colleagues described E. dikikae based on its remains of a partial skull and femurs in the Lower Awash of Dikika, Ethiopia, the locality dating to the middle Pliocene. It was described as having a notably heavier skull (albeit broken) than other Enhydriodon species or the modern sea otter. The species named was based directly on the site of Dikika. It was deemed as the largest species of Enhydriodon until another species also from Ethiopia, E. omoensis, was described from the Lower Omo Valley in 2022, dating from the late Pliocene up to the Plio-Pleistocene boundary (3.44-2.53 Ma). Similar to E. dikikae, the species name was derived directly from the site in which it was recovered. Similarly, the youngest known possible fossils of Enhydriodon from eastern Africa are also dated to the Early Pleistocene, circa 1.8-1.6 million years ago. In a September 2022 conference by Alberto Valenciano, Morales, and Pickford (the same month as the research paper on E. omoensis), however, they referred to certain lutrine species previously reclassified to Enhydriodon as Sivaonyx, namely S. hendeyi and S. africana.

=== Classification ===
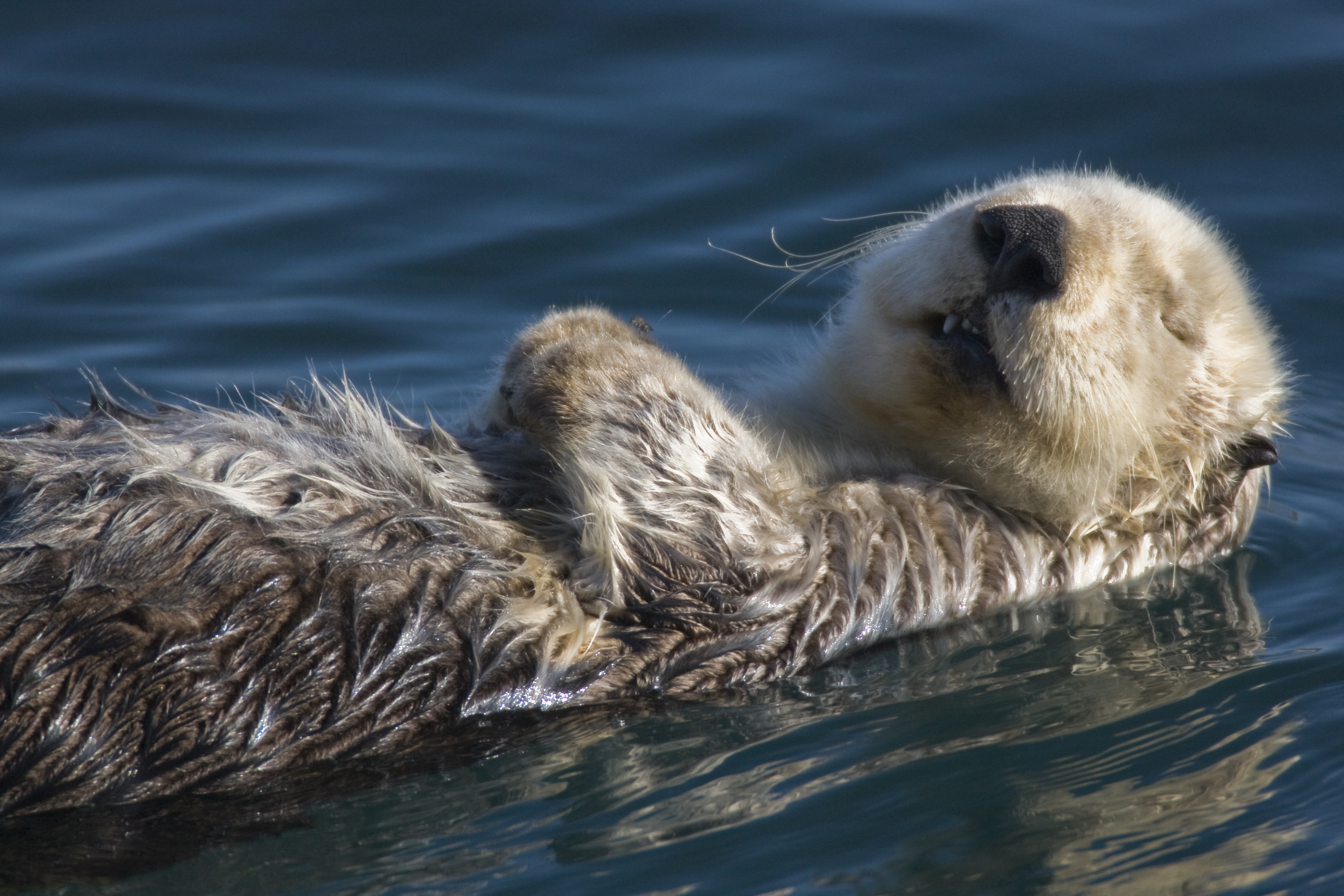
Enhydriodon's closest extant relative, the sea otter. It is the only extant bunodont otter.

Enhydriodon belongs to the tribe Enhydriodontini in the subfamily Lutrinae, which first appeared in Eurasia and Africa during the late Miocene epoch. It is perhaps the most well-known prehistoric otter given its old taxonomic history and it being a primary source of comparisons to other bunodont otter genera. It is generally thought that Enhydriodon was a result of a Miocene-Pleistocene trend that gave prehistoric lutrines bunodont teeth and large sizes compared to their extant relatives. It is classified as a member of the bunodont otters group, a categorical term commonly used by researchers that also includes Sivaonyx, Paludolutra, Vishnuonyx, Torolutra, Enhydritherium, Djourabus, Paralutra, Tyrrhenolutra, Siamogale and Enhydra. Bunodont otters are defined as large to very large mustelids of North America, Eurasia, and Africa that had robust dentition compared to most of the extant otters, generally allowing them to prey upon hard-armored creatures. (Note: Bunodont dentition refers to molars with round rather than sharp cusps, features that the sea otter and extinct lutrine relatives ("bunodont otters") have.) Despite sharing the feature of bunodont dentition, there are at least several clades of lutrines belonging to this category rather than one, so the term "bunodont otters" therefore is categorical rather than taxonomic and covers lutrines during the same periods with similar dentitions rather than one that directly defines their taxonomic state.

The following cladogram by Xiaoming Wang et al. in 2018 defines some of the following extant and extinct otter species and genera within the subfamily Lutrinae based on a 50% majority consensus (the bunodont otter genera are bolded beginning from "Paralutra jaegeri"):

- Lutrinae
  - Pteronura brasiliensis (giant river otter)
  - - - Lontra canadensis (North American river otter)
      - Lontra felina (marine otter)
    - - - Lutra lutra (Eurasian otter)
        - Aonyx capensis (African clawless otter)
      - - - †**Paralutra jaegeri**
          - - †**Siamogale melilutra**
            - †**Siamogale thailandica**
        - - - - **Enhydra lutris** (sea otter)
              - †**Enhydriodon**
            - - †**Vishnuonyx**
              - †**Sivaonyx**
          - - †**Tyrrhenolutra helbingi**
            - - †**Paralutra garganensis**
              - - †**Enhydritherium terranovae**
                - †**Paludolutra**
      - - †**Lutra aonychoides**

As shown in the above phylogeny, Enhydriodon shared a closer morphology with its other extinct relatives and Enhydra than the other extant lutrines that lack bunodont carnassial teeth (Lutra aonychoides was described as not being related to Lutra). Although the majority consensus tree displays a close morphological relation between Enhydriodon and Enhydra, the authors of the consensus tree also created a Bayesian inference tree proposing that Enhydra as an isolated clade separate from typical members of Enhydriodontini ("Paralutra" jaegeri was proposed as an isolated clade from Siamogale as well). Regardless, they argued that Enhydra is closer to the clade composing of Enhydriodon, Sivaonyx, and Vishnuonyx than any other bunodont otter genus. The researchers explained that the acquisition of bunodont dentition occurred at least three times in the evolution of lutrines, reflected by the phylogeny tree's clades: in Sivaonyx-Enhydriodon-Enhydra, in Paludolutra-Enhydritherium, and in Siamogale. Non-bunodont otters likely branched out separately from bunodont otters during or before the Pliocene epoch, but their poor fossil records and restriction to Plio-Pleistocene deposits in comparison leave little understanding in their evolutionary phylogenies.

== Description ==
=== Skull ===
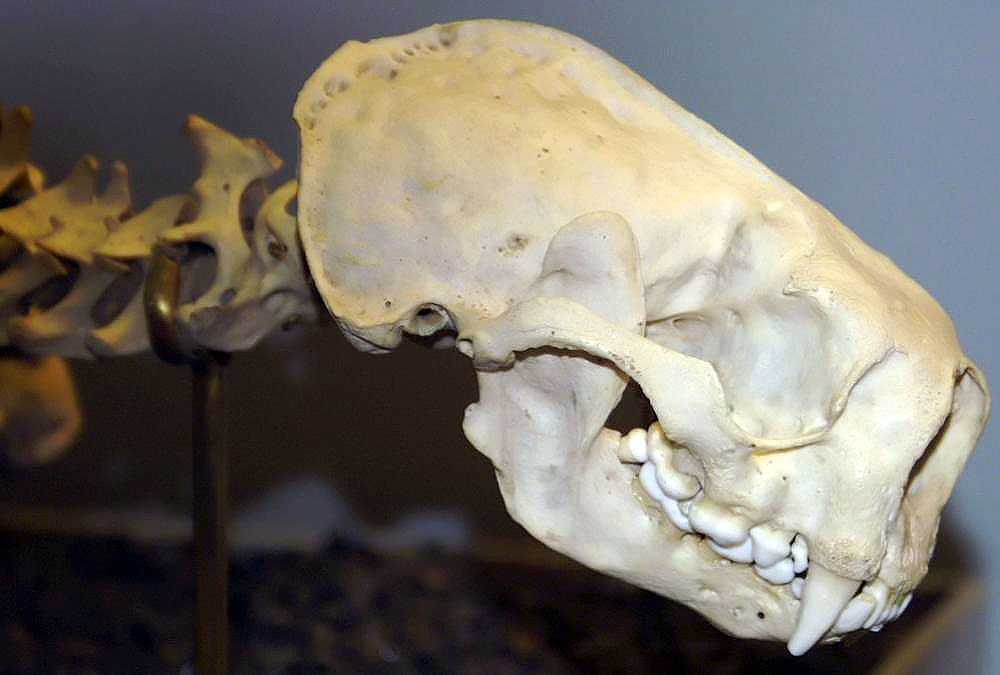
Skull of Enhydra lutris. Its I^{3}, while larger than its other incisors, is not hypertrophied in size unlike the Enhydriodon's I^{3}.

There are currently only two known partial skulls that are attributed to Enhydriodon: one of E. sivalensis of the Siwalik Hills and the other of E. dikikae of the Awash Valley. It is currently unknown whether the skulls' features of either species are well-representative of other species of Enhydriodon, but the known E. dikikae and E. sivalensis skulls have somewhat different features from each other.

The E. sivalensis skull, identified as belonging to a fully-grown individual, is relatively well-preserved with identifiable temporal crests, frontal, maxillae, premaxillae, nasal, muzzle, and palatine bone parts. However, it has also suffered from wear and being slightly twisted clockwise. Most notably, the dental arch is complete, although the left M^{1} and left I^{1} are both missing and most of the teeth are broken from their crowns. It has a large brain case, a broad and short muzzle, and a large nasal opening. Outlines of the orbits around the skull's frontals can also be identified.

The broken skull belonging to E. dikikae contains a short and non-prognathic snout, parts of the orbits, a nearly complete upper dental arch that is missing both I^{1}s and a right I^{2}, and part of the lower jaw. The muzzle on the E. dikikae skull is short, a small anterior orbital border positioned just above the posterior side of the canine. The front part of the snout is identified as short, thereby comparable with the snout of Enhydra. Although the evolution of bunodont otters like Enhydriodon is unclear, it is proposed that E. dikikae's short snout and very large canine size both clearly make the species different-looking and more evolutionarily derived (or evolutionarily recent) than E. sivalensis.

=== Dentition ===
Enhydriodon's dentition is well-defined by its extremely broad, bunodont carnassials in the molars and premolars similar to the modern sea otter. The Enhydriodon and Sivaonyx species differences are usually attributed to dentition, so the premolar teeth or molar teeth fossils are examined to discern the two bunodont otter genera. The generic differences (larger P^{4} hypocone, conical post-protocone cusps, and apparent lack of anterior upper premolars for Enhydriodon) by tooth measurements have been difficult to prove due to the fragmentary nature of the fossils and relative inconsistencies of tooth measurements/dimensions by species. The reclassification of all "African Sivaonyx" species other than S. beyi to Enhydriodon in 2022 has been attributed to "[a] metaconid higher than the protoconid on M_{1}, presence of a carnassial notch and one or more cusps between the protocone and the hypocone on P^{4}, and/or distolingual expansion on M^{1}."

Enhydriodon as the latest-appearing genus is suggested to have the most bunodont dentition of the Enhydriodontini tribe, which includes the earliest-appearing Vishnuonyx and then Sivaonyx. Enhydriodon's dentition suggests a near suppression of carnassial functions in favour of crushing as the predominant function. The I^{3} (or third upper incisor) of Enhydriodon is much larger than its I^{1} (smallest incisor) and I^{2}, appearing larger and more canine-like in comparison to Paludolutra and Enhydra. In comparison to other bunodont lutrine genera where the upper incisor is known, its third incisors are only marginally larger than their first and second incisors. The right I^{1} of a skull of E. sivalensis, for instance, measures 3 mm (0.12 in) in anteroposterior diameter (APD) and 4.5 mm (0.18 in) in transverse diameter (TD). The skull's right I^{2} measures 5.2 mm (0.20 in) in APD and 5.5 mm (0.22 in) in TD. In comparison, the right I^{3} is the largest incisor of the holotype, with measurements of 10.5 mm (0.41 in) in APD and 8 mm (0.31 in) in TD (the canines are larger than the incisors, measuring 17.1 mm (0.67 in) in APD and 13.8 mm (0.54 in) in TD). The large I^{3} trait also applies to E. dikikae, which was described after Pickford's general description of the Enhydriodon genus as having a much larger I^{3} than I^{1} - I^{2} and being more conical in shape. DIK-56's I^{3} tooth measures 12.4 mm (0.49 in) in mesiodistal width (MD) and 11.6 mm (0.46 in) in buccolingual width (BL) compared to its I^{2} measurements of 5.5 mm (0.22 in) in MD and 9.7 mm (0.38 in) in BL. Like E. sivalensis, the I^{3} is shorter than the canines, with C^{1} measuring 16.9 mm (0.67 in) in MD plus 15 mm (0.59 in) in BL and C_{1} measuring 19.5 mm (0.77 in) in MD and 15.3 mm (0.60 in) in BL.

=== Limbs ===
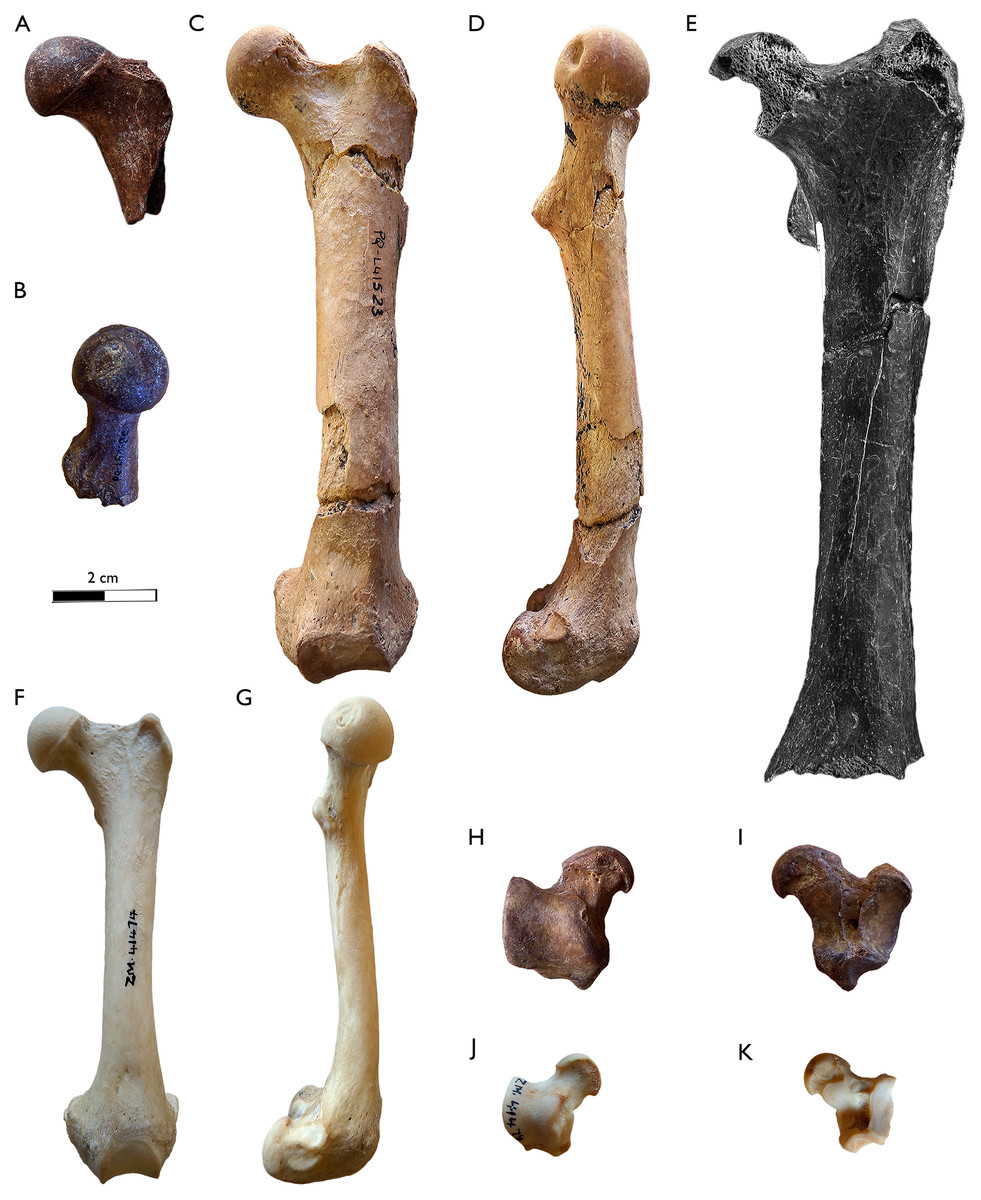
Views of the left proximal epiphysis of the femur (A-B), complete left femur (C-D), and astragalus (H-I) of Enhydriodon hendeyi in comparison to a Sivaonyx beyi left femur (E) plus a left femur (F-G) and left astragalus (J-K) of the African clawless otter.

Postcranial remains of bunodont otters, including Enhydriodon, are scarce, leaving too little information on the overall anatomies of many genera. The only known species of Enhydriodon with postcranial remains are E. hendeyi, E. dikikae, and E. omoensis.

E. hendeyi fossil remains include a fragmentary humerus, an ulna, two femurs, and an astragalus (also known as a talus bone). The femora of E. hendeyi are smaller than those of S. beyi and E. dikikae but also larger than those of Enydritherium, Satherium, and the extant African clawless otter. The astragalus is similar to E. omoensis but differs by the smaller head and thinner neck as well as a larger distal projection of the bone's tubercle. The talus bone's trochlea (grooved surface forming the joints of bones) is shallow and mediolaterally wide while its tubercle is projected in the approximate center, both of which produce a robust and deep groove (or furrow) of the tendons of the plantar flexion muscles for extension of the foot at the ankle compared to the African clawless otter.

The postcranial remains of E. dikikae are known by the proximal (upper part) left femur, distal (lower part) right femur, and a humerus. The proximal left femur is known by a large tubercle along the posterior area of the neck, middle-aligning lesser trochanter, and a similar position of the medial condyle of the femur. The femur specimens indicate large overall sizes of the femurs of E. dikikae compared with even the largest extant otters. The humerus (complete but weathered and cracked) is much longer and slightly robust compared to that of Sivaonyx beyi, and its deltoid tuberosity is well-formed. The lateral supracondylar crest is longer compared to S. beyi while the medial epicondyle is not as prominent in size. The olecranon fossa is small and more circular compared to S. beyi.

E. omoensis is represented only by a single complete left femur which has a short neck and a round head that is oriented in a proximal direction (close to the center) rather than a medial direction (in the center), the former being shifted at 40° relative to the longitude of the diaphysis section of the bone. The lateromedial width of the epiphysis is narrow. The femur also has a large femoral head located on the ventromedial head (aligning to the middle underside of it), a greater trochanter that bends on the back and is lower than the femoral head, a short and deep trochanteric fossa, and a strong lesser trochanter that is centered more in the middle than on the ventral (or underside) and is thereby visible in a back view. The medial condyle of the femur is larger than the lateral condyle of the same bone. The intercondylar fossa of the femur is rectangular and wide.

=== Body Mass ===
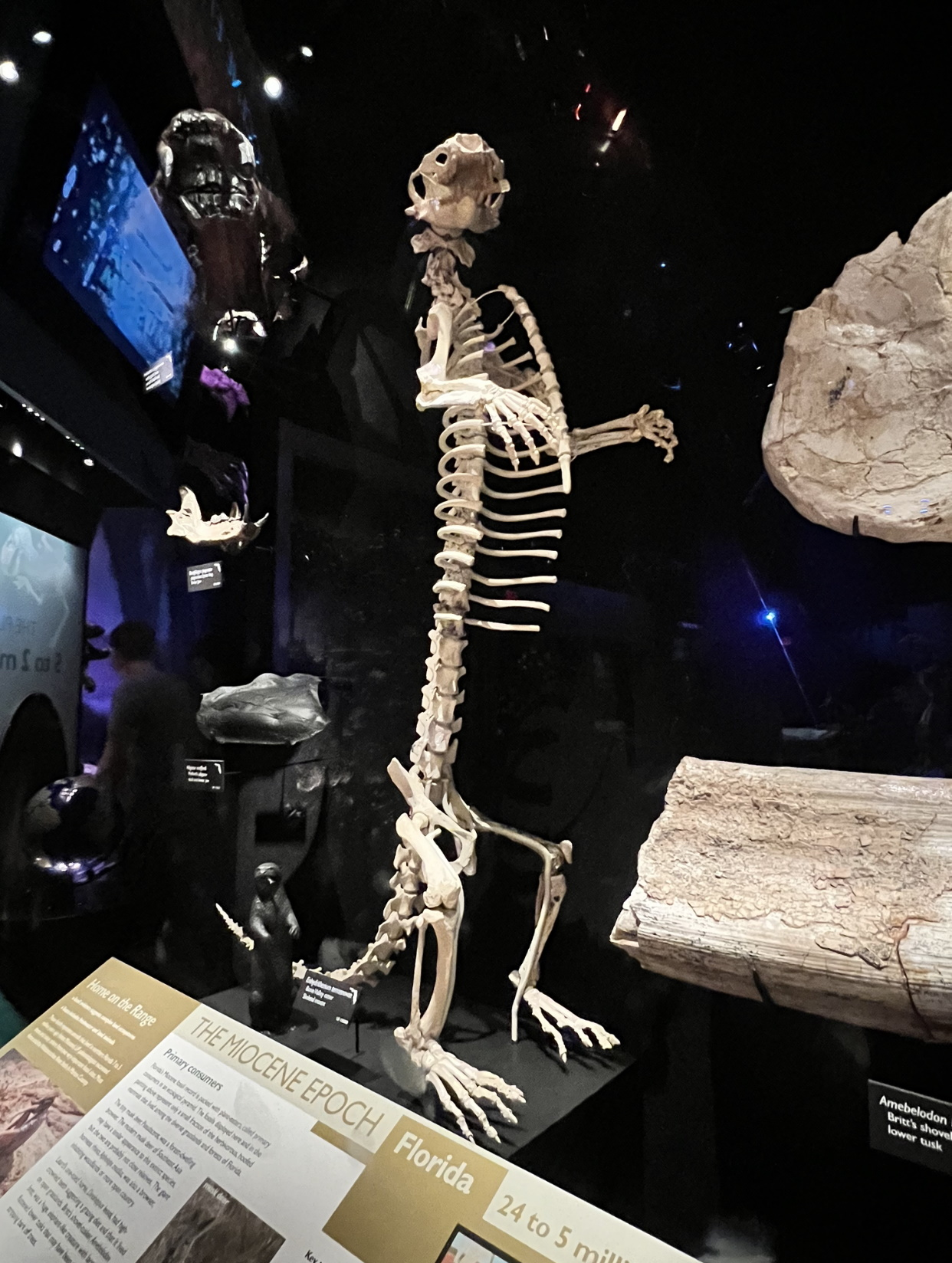
Skeleton of Enhydritherium, a bunodont otter genus, in a bipedal position. Bunodont otters including Enhydra, Enhydritherium and Enhydriodon are typically estimated to be larger/heavier than non-bunodont otters.

Some Enhydriodon species, particularly a few that had resided in Africa, are the largest known mustelids to have ever existed based on weight estimates, but their precise sizes and weights remain unknown given the lack of complete specimens in their fossil records. Some species like E. latipes(?) are poorly studied compared to others and therefore lack confirmed size or weight estimates. It is generally estimated that some species of Enhydriodon are similar in weight to modern large-sized otters while others are estimated as much larger than them (It should also be noted that weight estimates are more often made for bunodont otters like Enhydriodon than size estimates, although size comparisons to modern animals may be referenced).

The two species of Enhydriodon native to the subcontinent of India had modest weight estimates, comparable with most other bunodont otter genera as well as extant otter genera. Falconer's 1868 memoir described E. sivalensis as a lutrine the size of a panther. In 1932, Pilgrim diagnosed E. falconeri as being smaller than E. sivalensis, although no size or weight estimates were offered for it by him. In 2007, Pickford estimated E. sivalensis to be the largest prehistoric otter in India, ranging from 22 kg (49 lb) minimum to 25 kg (55 lb) maximum in body weight, its skull possibly being wolf-sized. He also estimated the body of E. falconeri based on its lower M_{1} teeth dimensions to be similar to the African clawless otter (A. capensis), averaging to 16 kg (35 lb).

Africa's Enhydriodon species are estimated to be some of the largest species of otters to ever exist, reflecting on the Miocene-Pleistocene trend of bunodont otters growing larger than their non-bunodont cousins. Pickford described E. kamuhangirei of the Western Rift Valley, Uganda (at the time Sivaonyx kamuhangirei) to possibly exceed 100 kg (220 lb) in weight, making it the largest-known prehistoric otter at the time, although he mentioned that the undescribed fossil otters in Ethiopia (likely sorted later under E. dikikae and/or E. omoensis) could have possibly been larger than it. E. hendeyi (then Sivaonyx hendeyi) was estimated to be wolf-sized and around 40 kg (88 lb), whileE. africanus and E. ekecaman are thought to be of similar sizes. E. dikikae of Ethiopia was estimated to have weighed 100 kg (220 lb) minimum and 200 kg (440 lb) maximum (the latter mentioned to be more likely), its holotype suggesting a bearlike size. Compared with most other Enhydriodon or Enhydra species, it had an estimated skull length of about 25 cm (9.8 in). E. omoensis was later estimated to weigh more than 200 kg (440 lb), making it heavier than E. dikikae and modern lions. According to Grohé et al., E. omoensis was potentially "lion-sized", making it the largest mustelid species to ever exist.

== Palaeobiology ==
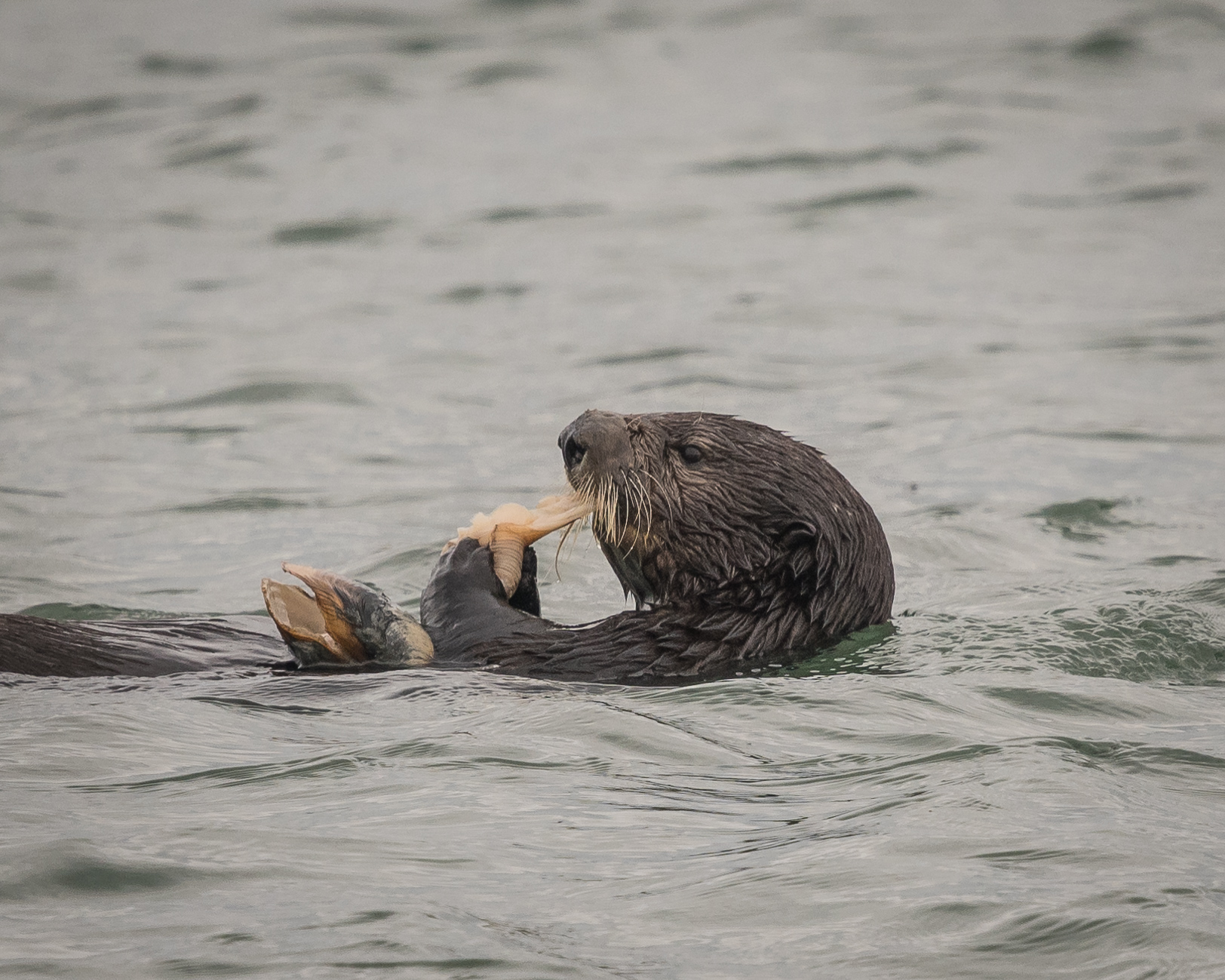
A sea otter eating a clam, similar to suggested diets of certain Enhydriodon species

As fossil bunodont otter genera including Enhydriodon generally lack complete specimens and postcranial elements, their locomotion and ecological niches remain uncertain. A common theory of the Indian subcontinental species of Enhydriodon is that based on their robust, bunodont dentition similar to Enhydra, E. falconeri and E. sivalensis were both specialized for commonly eating shellfish. This claim was made first by Willemsen from analogies of the diet of Enhydra (abalones and marine bivales) and Aonyx (freshwater crabs), but there is little palaeontological evidence to directly support this claim. Regardless, it is suggested that the thick enamel in the posterior dentition of Indian Enhydriodon species makes them more molluscivorous than cancrivorous (in contrast, Indian Sivaonyx species are suggested to have combined shearing functions of the carnassials with overall bunodont crowns to prey more on crustaceans, although bivalves could potentially have been secondary prey for it). The possibility of Enhydriodon preying on bivalves is supported by the presence of fossilized freshwater bivalve genera Parreysia and Lamellidens in the same locations as them, both of which are common throughout the entire Siwalik sedimentary column which spans from 15-2 mya, ranging with the presence of the Enhydriodontini tribe in the Indian subcontinent (India and Pakistan).

The larger Enhydriodon species in the African continent are suggested to have preyed upon a wider variety of foods in addition to their primary prey including softer prey despite their bunodont dentitions, making their potential diets distinct from those of their Indian subcontinental counterparts. One suggested type of prey was large fish with hard external coverings such as catfish. Several catfish genera were present in Africa starting from their first appearances during the late Miocene coinciding with the presence of Enhydriodon, including the extant genera Clarotes, Bagrus, Auchenoglanis, and Chrysichthys and the extinct genus Nkondobagrus. In contrast to the slow-moving, abundant catfish, crabs in Africa were excluded as potential prey for African species of Enhydriodon given the lack of fossilized crabs at Dikika, unlikeliness for biomasses of crabs to support populations of large otters, and apparent incompatibility for enamel dentition. Fast-swimming fish might have been unlikely to have been regular food sources due to the specialized dentition for crushing hard food in addition to large animals likely not having the ability to catch fast prey. Other armored prey, such as juvenile crocodiles, turtles, and ostrich eggs, were also suggested prey of E. dikikae.

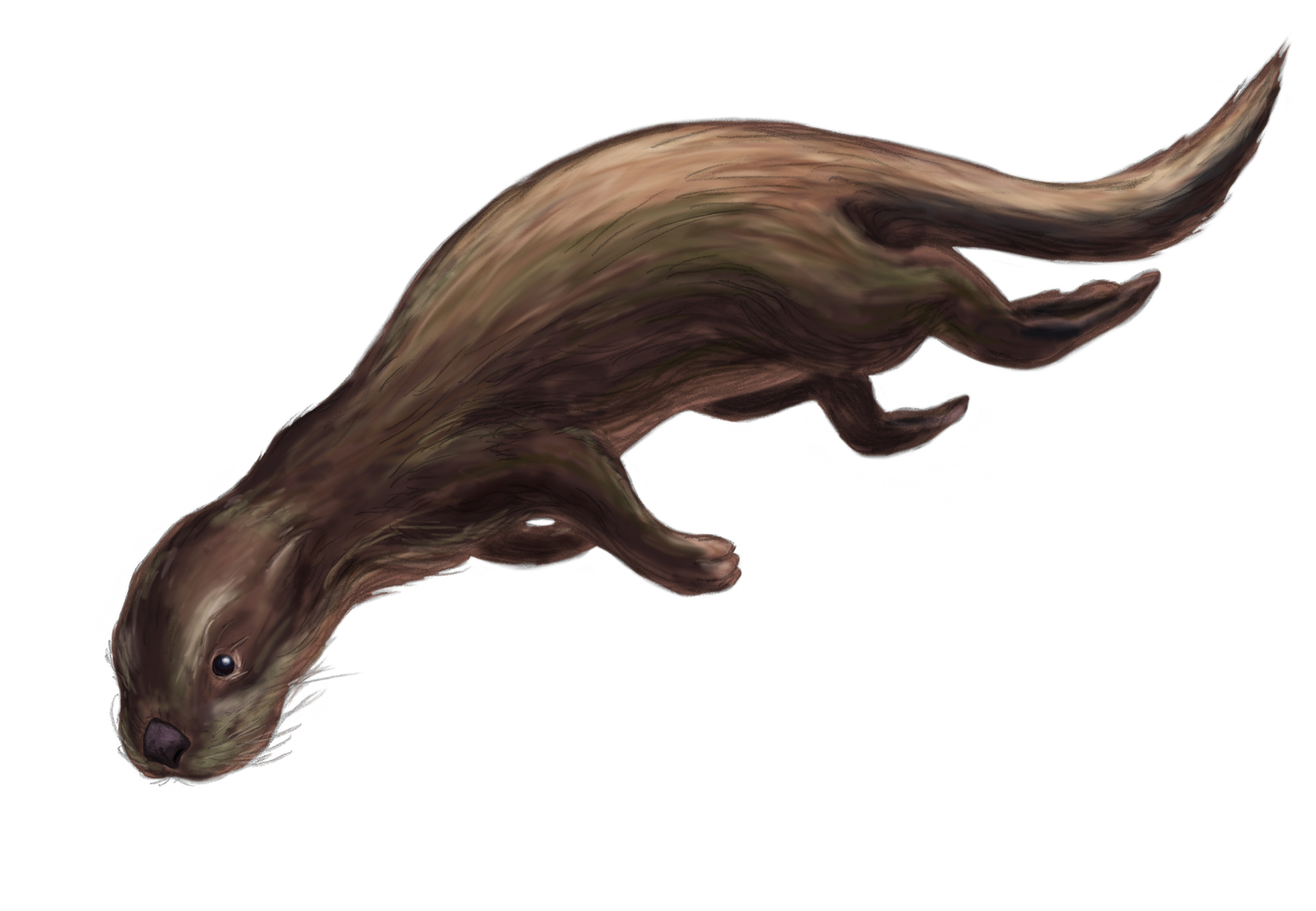
Hypothetical life restoration of E. sivalensis swimming, its appearance being similar to its relative, the sea otter

Femora and dental remains of African Enhydriodon could possibly hint at a semiaquatic as well as terrestrial lifestyle, meaning that it could have eaten both aquatic prey and terrestrial prey. The speculations of Enhydriodon's lifestyle, however, have been contradictory to each other, so there is, therefore, no majority consensus on it. In 2008, it was speculated that smaller African species of Enhydriodon based on their smaller femur sizes were more locomotor generalists similar to most mustelids while larger species were fully aquatic since their femur structures shared similarities to Enhydra. However, the Omo and Hadar femoras' proximal ends pointed to a more aquatic nature than most lutrines, while their relative lengths resembled that of terrestrial generalist mustelids, including semiaquatic otters. Sivaonyx beyi of Chad, speculated to weigh 56.4 kg (124 lb) to 60.1 kg (132 lb), had non-specialized limb proportions that implied generalist-terrestrial locomotion and poor aquatic adaptations. Because of the hypothesis that S. beyi was a terrestrial predator, E. dikikae is speculated to have been mostly terrestrial based on its shared fossil location with both aquatic and terrestrial fauna at Dikika. The palaeobiologies and niche partitionings of E. ekecaman and E. cf. dikikae in Kanapoi, Kenya remain unclear as their fossil materials, uncovered in the 1960s, were not specifically pronounced beyond "Kanapoi", which future research would have to cover. It is also pointed out that African species of bunodont otters like Enhydriodon and Sivaonyx were always found in sites in association with permanent bodies of water as opposed to the Upper Laetolil Beds in Laetoli, Tanzania which lacked such a feature, putting a question to the extent of the possibly terrestrial lifestyle of African Enhydriodon and Sivaonyx species.

E. hendeyi was analysed based on femoral robustness index (FRI) and the femoral epicondylar index (FEI), in which its FRI value is comparable to the extinct S. beyi, Enhydritherium, and Satherium (the latter two which are analogous to the large sea otter and giant river otter (Pteronura brasiliensis) respectively and have larger values in femoral indexes than most other extant otters) while its FEI value is analogous to the extant African clawless otter and Asian small-clawed otter (Aonyx cinereus). Since both the African clawless otter and Asian small-clawed otter are typically less associated with water bodies compared to other extant otters, it is hypothesized that E. hendeyi and S. beyi were both semiaquatic locomotors that had lower associations with water than aquatic locomotors Enhydritherium and Satherium, although S. beyi was said to be more terrestrial than E. hendeyi. Meanwhile, the lowest values correspond with E. dikikae, which has similar values to terrestrial semifossorial (adapted to digging and living somewhat underground) musteloids such as the American badger and the striped skunk, thereby reinforcing the hypothesis that E. dikikae was a more generalized terrestrial mustelid similar to S. beyi.

With the overall lack of consensus on the lifestyle of African Enhydriodon species considered, a 2022 study on E. omoensis measured the stable carbon and oxygen isotope ratios of Enhydriodon species in comparison to extant terrestrial mammals such as felids, hyaenids, and bovids along with semiaquatic mammals such as hippopotamids. The authors explained that using oxygen isotopic ratios, or δ18O, can be used to understand a taxon's dependency on water, in which extant aquatic and semiaquatic taxa, which includes river and sea otters, have significantly lower oxygen isotopic deviations compared to terrestrial carnivorans. The researchers who studied E. omoensis found that its tooth enamel δ18O values had a standard deviation of 2.7%, falling outside the δ18O standard deviations of the sea otter, and the North American river otter (Lontra canadensis), which were recorded to be 0.6% and 0.3%-0.9% respectively. The standard deviation of Omo Enhydriodon aligns itself more within the range of extant terrestrial carnivorans such as hyaenids, suggesting that E. omoensis was not as semiaquatic as initially thought. The results of the study contradict the 2008 assumption that the Omo Enhydriodon species was aquatic.

Grohe et al. initially considered that the diet of Enhydriodon could have been the oyster Etheria elliptica, which was present in the continent at the same time range. Based on investigations using carbon stable isotopes, a diet of pure oysters would result in an enamel δ13C value of −11.3%. The diet of E. omoensis, however, was not based purely on Etheria as its minimum-maximum carbon values (-9.7% to -4.7%) are ~2-7% more positive than the expected pure oyster diet value. Its enamel δ13C values fall within the range of mixed C_{3}-C_{4} feeders, only partly falling within the range of diets of aquatic feeders of C_{3} plants such as fish, turtles, or bivalves. The δ13C standard deviation of Omo Enhydriodon, however, falls outside the range of studied extant freshwater otter populations. It is instead considered that E. omoensis consumed terrestrial prey with a C_{4} diet at least semi-regularly via hunting and/or scavenging. The large bunodont dentition of the species suggests durophageous abilities that allowed it to feed on carrion, including bones, in potentially a similar manner to hyeanas or bone-crushing mustelids.

== Palaeoecology ==
=== Pakistan and India ===
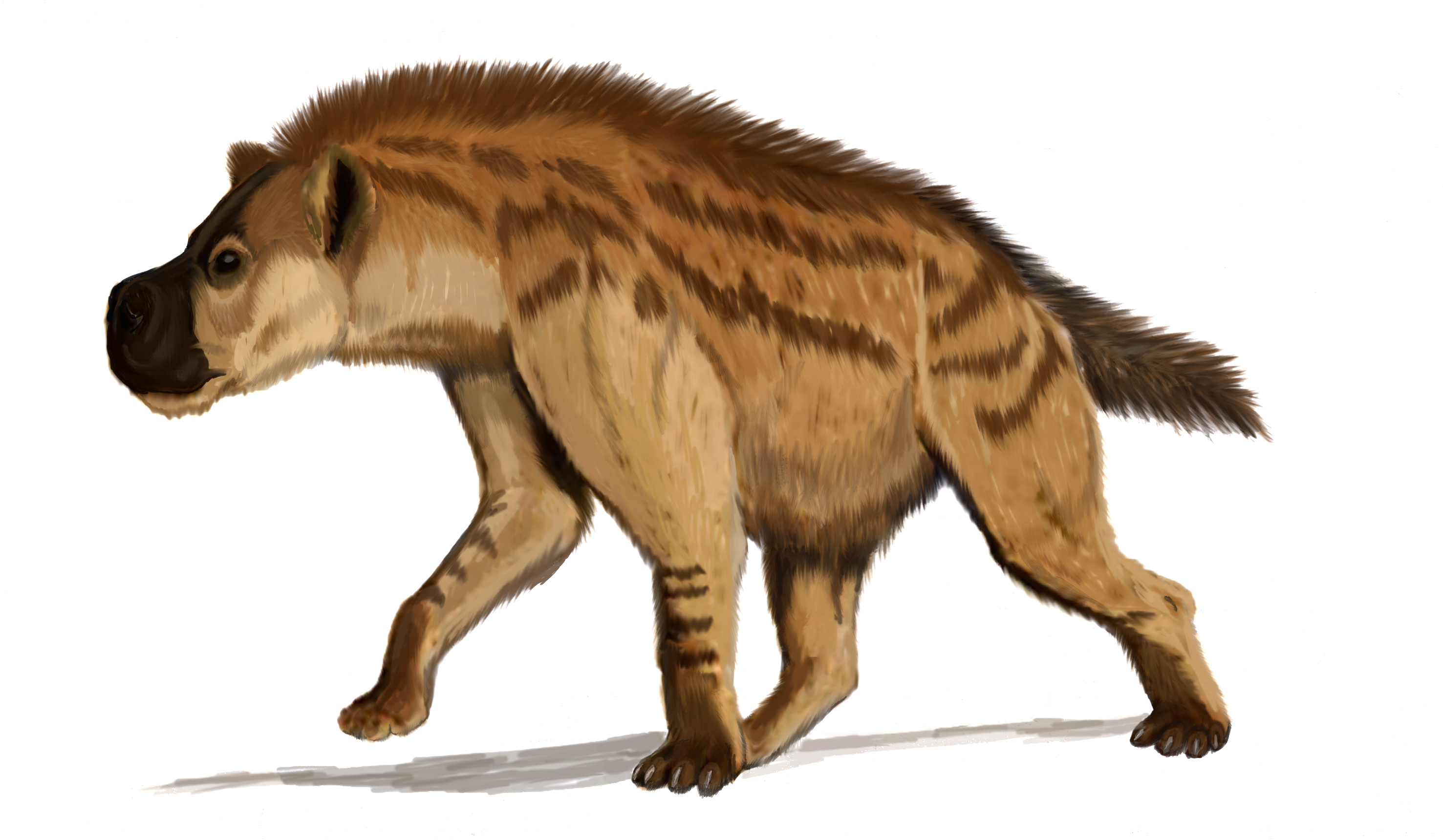
A restoration of Dinocrocuta gigantea, a species of percrocutine hyaenid, which lived in the Indian subcontinent and coexisted with E. falconeri and other hyaenids during the late Miocene

E. falconeri and E. sivalensis, while both Enhydriodon species that were present in the Siwalik Hills in India and Pakistan during the Neogene period, did not coexist for the same epochs based on their formation deposit appearances. E. falconeri remains were present at the Nagri Formation (Dhok Milan and Sethi Nagri, Pakistan) and the Dhok Pathan Formation (Dhok Pathan and Hasnot, Pakistan), both formations dating back to the middle Siwaliks representing late Miocene. The species was also present at the Tatrot Formation (Tatrot, India) of the Upper Siwaliks from the early or middle Pliocene. In the Nagri and Dhok Pathan Formations, E. falconeri was shown to have existed with several archaic mammalian carnivorous families that went extinct before the Pliocene, such as hyainailourine hyaenodonts and amphicyonids. The early otter species also existed with various extinct carnivorous members of extant families during the late Miocene representing other mustelids, ursids, felids (felines and machairodontines), hyaenids (percrocutinae hyaenids ictitheres, and hyaenines), viverrids, and herpestids. It is suggested that the extinction of the amphicyonids and percrocutids left empty predatory niches that were quickly filled by other hyaenid genera, which became highly diversified and coexisted with felids in the subcontinent.

Other extinct members of extant and extinct mammalian families were found in the Nagri Formation and thereby existed with E. falconeri including bovids, giraffids, anthracotheres, tragulids, suids, hipparionine equids, rhinocerotids, chalicotheres, gomphotheres, hominids, and spalacids. An extinct reptilian species of gharial, Gavialis lewisi (?), is reported from the Dhok Pathan Formation of Pakistan and is Pliocene in age. Mammal genera that were found in the Dhok Pathan Formation are generally consistent with the mammal genera found within the Nagri Formation but also include other bovids, giraffids, cervine cervids, anthracotheres, suids, hipparionines, rhinocerotids, "tetralophodont gomphotheres", cercopithecids, and hystricids.

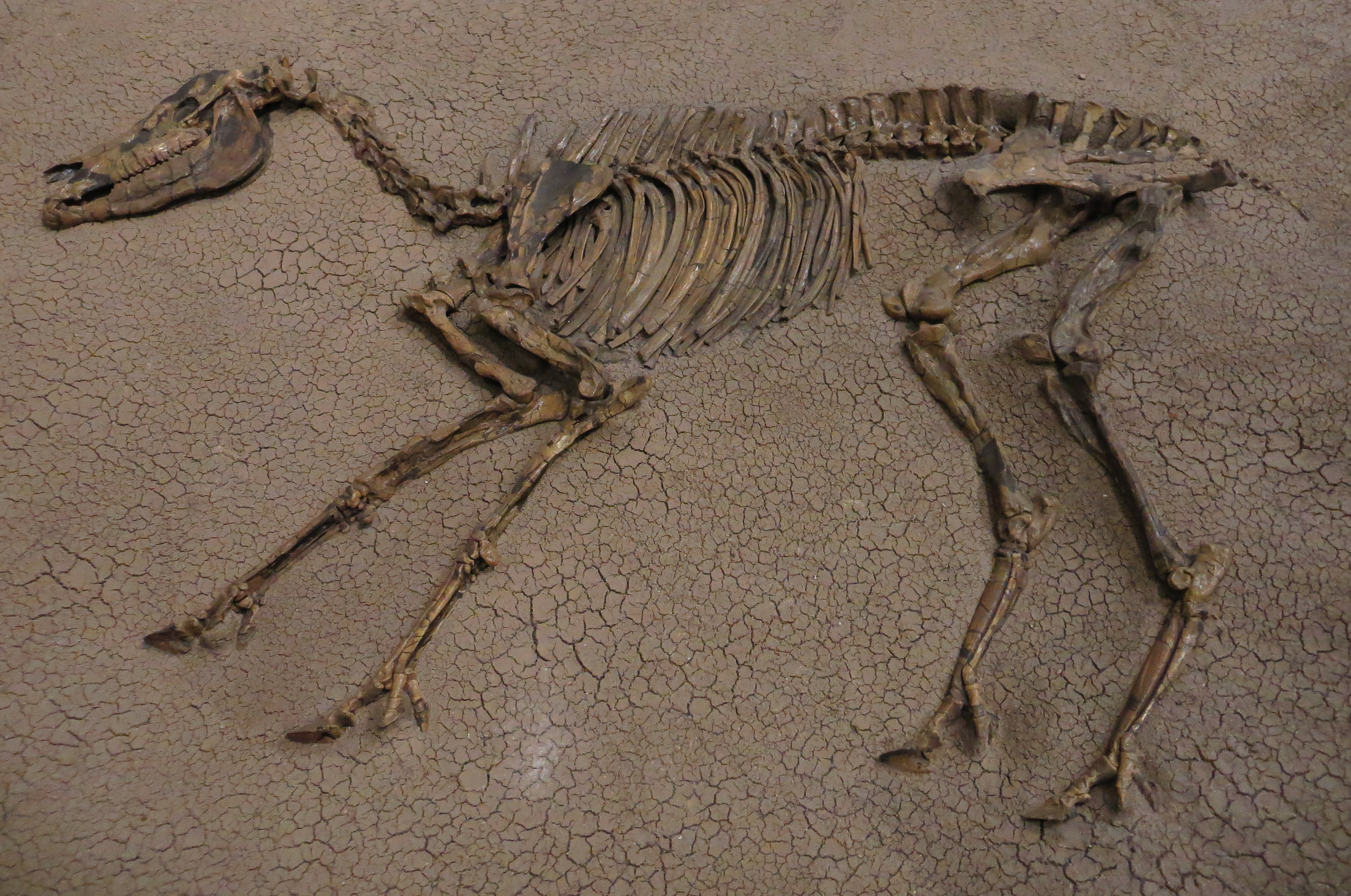
The arrival of Hipparionini equids such as Hipparion to Eurasia are representative of major Eurasian faunal turnovers of the late Miocene

The transition from the middle Miocene to the late Miocene reflected a period in which the evergreen to deciduous tropical forests once covering a large part of the Indian subcontinent shrank and were replaced by grasslands because of global cooling, drier conditions, and the intensification of Asian monsoons. A change from the Nagri floodplains to the Dhok Pathan floodplains suggests less draining in the fluvial system of the latter compared to the former with Dhok Pathan's smaller rivers having more seasonal flow than before. This reflects the general trend of late Miocene climate forcing resulting in more seasonality, bringing about large faunal turnovers. The drier and more seasonal climates along with fluvial changes gradually brought about larger, open woodlands predominantly consisting of C_{4} plants near the Potwar Miocene rivers while communities exclusively or predominantly consisting of C_{3} plants diminished greatly and eventually disappeared by 7.0 Ma along with the C_{3} feeders that depended more on closed vegetation. These changes occurred shortly after the arrivals of the hipparionines and marked decreases in mammal groups within the Indian subcontinent such as the extinctions of the hominid Sivapithecus and the deinothere Deinotherium as a result of the fragmentation of closed habitats in favour of open habitats that would eliminate food for C_{3} browsers and frugivores.

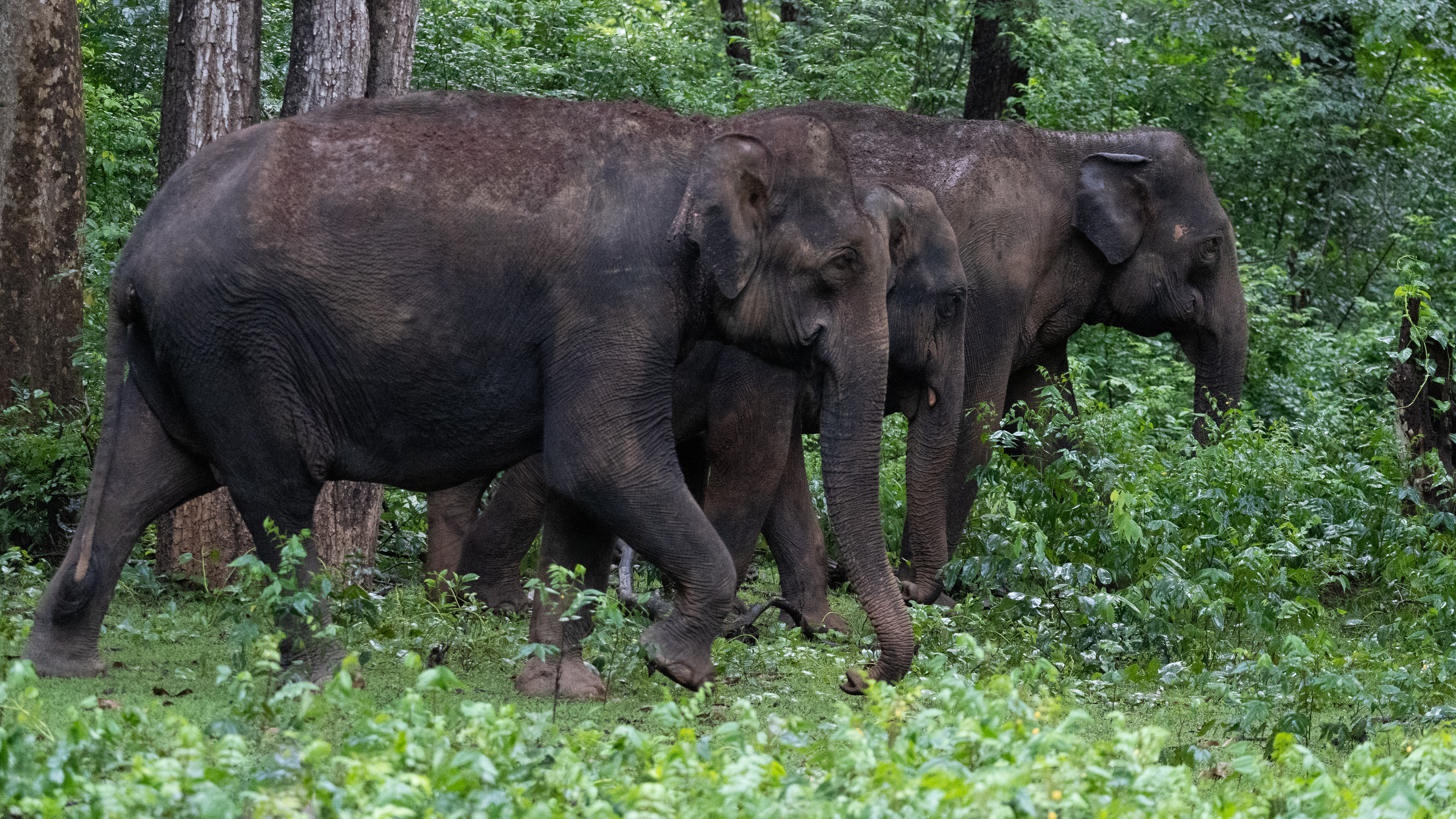
Elephas was a typical grazer of C_{4} plants from the Pliocene-Pleistocene. It adapted its diets to mixed feeding of C_{3} plants by middle Pleistocene while Stegodon was a consistent C_{4} browser that failed to adapt and went extinct.

The carnivoran fossil records of the Tatrot Formation in India are scarce, but amongst the extinct members that existed with E. falconeri in the Pliocene were other lutrines, machairodontines, and hyaenids. Herbivorous mammals found at the Tatrot Formation on the Potwar Plateau contain highly diverse assemblages of bovids but also include cervids, suids, elephantids, stegodontids, hipparionines, anthracotheres, hippopotamids, giraffids, and tragulids. The crocodilians Crocodylus and Rhamphosuchus, the pelican Pelecanus, turtles (Batagur, Geoclemys, Hardella, and Pangshura), and the freshwater crab Acanthopotamon are reported from at least the Tatrot or Pinjor Formations of India as well, indicating an active freshwater habitat that E. falconeri and later E. sivalensis were present in.

Amongst carnivoran taxa, Enhydriodon is the longest-lasting caniform genus to have ever existed within the Siwaliks of the Indian subcontinent, identified from the Nagri-Pinjor formations. However, the species identified within the Pinjor Formation of the Plio-Pleistocene epochs is E. sivalensis, which suggests that E. falconeri after a long time of relative success eventually might have gone through anagenesis by the Pliocene. Other carnivoran genera that were found in the Pinjor Formation included the newly arrived canids as well as mustelids, ursids, felids (machairodontines, pantherines, and felines), hyaenids, and viverrids. Other mammalian genera found within the Pinjor Formation includes hominids, cercopithecids, rodents of various families, proboscideans, equines of the Equini tribe, rhinocerotids, suids, cervids, giraffids, and bovids.

=== Ethiopia ===
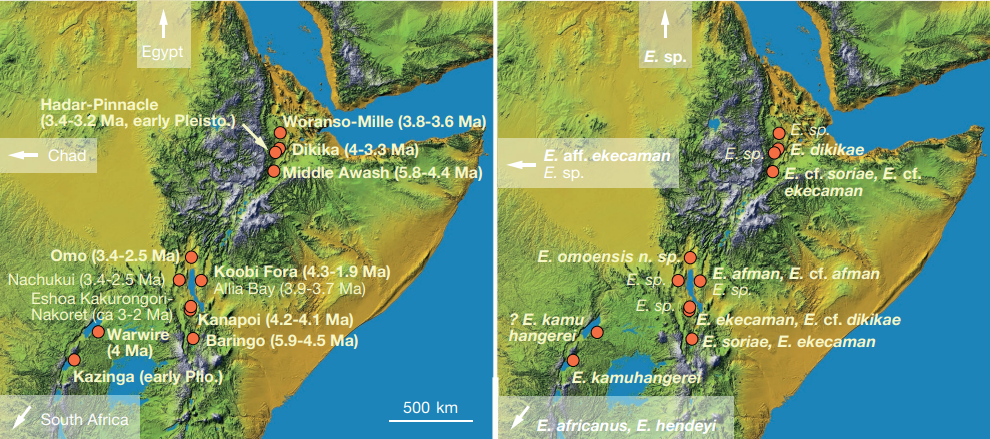
Geographical and stratigraphic distribution of Enhydriodon in East Africa by species

E. dikikae and E. omoensis were large lutrine species found in different locations within modern-day Ethiopia. E. dikikae fossils were found within the bottom two sequences of the Hadar Formation of the Lower Awash Valley, Ethiopia, indicating that its fossils range from 4 Ma to 3.2 Ma. Fossils of E. omoensis were located at the Usno Formation and Shungura Formation of the Lower Omo Valley in Ethiopia, the fossils ranging from 3.44 Ma to 2.53 Ma. E. dikikae was named after the Dikikae Basal Member of the Hadar Formation while E. omoensis had its name derived from the Lower Omo Valley.

There are four members of the Dikika composite sequence as part of the Pliocene Hadar Formation, from base to top: the Basal, Sidi Hakoma, Denen Dora, and Kada Hadar members. All together, they are dated to ca. 3.5-2.9 Ma and are best known for the numerous remains of Australopithecus afarensis. E. dikikae fossils are known from the formation's Basal and Sigi Hakoma members and are unknown in the other top two members.

Based on methods of determining palaeoenvironments such as ecomorphological analysis, dental microwear of bovids, and carbon and oxygen isotopes of enamel, the Basal Member (BM) has the greatest abundance of bovids and suids in the Hadar Formation, suggesting that the environments of which they were present in were possibly woody grasslands as well as riverine forests. The Aepycerotini were common within the member, fitting with the tribe's preference for ecotonal habitats between grasslands and woodlands.

The Sidi Hakoma Submember 1 (SH-1), ranging from ~3.45 to 3.35 Ma, had similar fauna and thereby similar habitats to other members within the Hadar Formation but also likely included wetlands in certain regions. Taxa such as a species within the forest-dwelling Cephalophini tribe and five species of primates were recovered from the member, further indicating a large riverine forest with, predominantly, woodlands in the surrounding area. Aepyceros was the most abundant bovid, and SH-1 had the lowest proportion of grazing bovids at any sub-member of the Hadar Formation. The vegetation of SH-1 might have closely resembled those at the Guinea or Sudanese savannas that interdigitate with the central African rainforest, which creates habitat mosaics of grasslands, woodlands, and some forest belts. The ostracod assemblage of the Basal and Sidi Hakoma Members indicate sources of freshwater input, in which their shells also indicate only a three-month dry season, characteristic of the central African savannas. The single dry season, indicating a nine-month rainy season, is a distinctive factor of the Sidi Hakoma member from the modern climate in East Africa, which has a bimodal dry season format (two dry seasons) rather than a single one. The Sidi Hakoma Submember 2 (SH-2) is similar to SH-1 and is thought to have been associated with woodlands with some grassy plains, of which Aepycerotini was the most common.

Sidi Hakoma Submember 3 (SH-3) indicates the presence of woodlands and grasslands with more lakeside wetlands compared to the previous sub-members, with increased presences of reduncine bovids and the highest abundance of tragelaphin bovids, which indicate either more closed habitats or wetlands. It also contains the largest micromammal assemblages of extant murid genera such as the extant Acomys, Golunda and Oenomys and the extinct Saidomys, of which Golunda is now extinct in Africa. Sidi Hakoma Submember 4 indicates wetland habitats that surround lakes within drier environments. A further increase of Reduncinae bovids and a decrease in alcelaphin bovids indicates said lakeshore environments and surrounding wetlands. The bovid abundance data suggests similar amounts of tree cover for SH-3 and SH-4 with the difference being that the latter was slightly drier than the former.

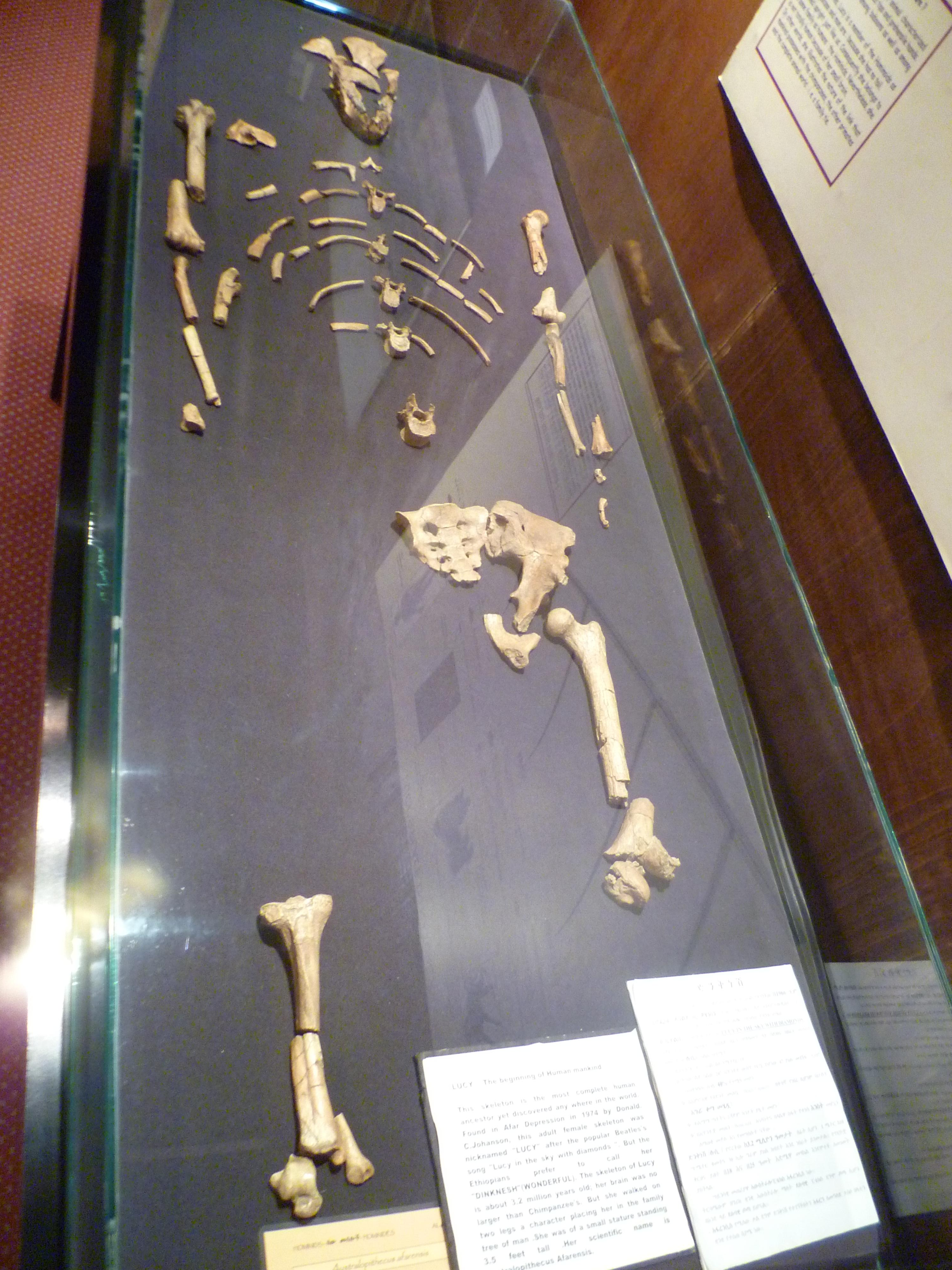
Skeleton of Lucy, the most well-known Australopithecus afarensis fossil, at the National Museum of Ethiopia.

The Hadar Formation represents many fossils of Australopithecus afarensis, most notably the partial skeleton known as "Lucy". The aggregate time span of the species is at least 0.7 myr, from 3.7 Ma to 3.0 Ma. The Hadar Formation is also known for its representation of a great diversity of bovid species that represented most major tribes in Africa. The bovid tribes that were found in the formation included the Aepycerotini, Alcelaphini, Antilopini, Bovini, Caprini, Cephalophini, Hippotragini, Neotragini, Reduncini, and Tragelaphini. Other groups, represented by extinct species of extant or extinct genera, include giraffids, hippopotamuses, suids, canids, felids (machairodontines were the most common), hyaenids, other mustelids, viverrids, rhinoceroses, equids, catarrhines, deinotheres, and elephantids were all also found within the locality. Small mammal groups include bats, leporids, old world porcupines, murid rodents, spalacids, squirrels, and aardvarks.

Other Pliocene-age formations within Ethiopia show similar trends of great diversity in the Bovidae family from its multiple tribes along with suids, hippopatamids, cercopithecids, hominids, and equids of generally the same genera as the Hadar Formation. Most herbivores present in the Shungura Formation show either consistent C_{4} diets or had generally shifted from mixed C_{3}-C_{4} diets to generally C_{4} diets as indicated from changes in dentition by formation member. These trends suggest that the African herbivores in the Pliocene were increasingly shifting to C_{4} herbivory as opposed to browsing and mixed feeding as a result of the increasing dominance of C_{4} grasslands in Africa. There were a few exceptions, however, as Giraffidae and Deinotheriidae were both consistently C_{3} browsers within the formation while the bovid tribes Aepycerotini and Tragelaphini were predominantly mixed feeders with little change in diet. Fossil fish remains are also known from the Shungura Formation, namely the genera Polypterus, Sindacharax, Synodontis, Auchenoglanis, and Lates.
