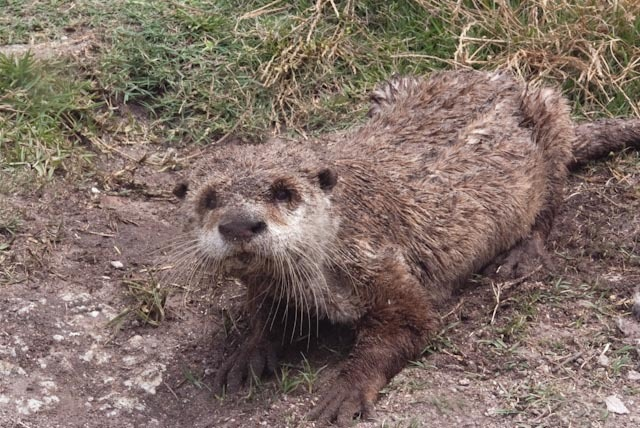

Scientific classification
- Kingdom: Animalia
- Phylum: Chordata
- Class: Mammalia
- Infraclass: Placentalia
- Order: Carnivora
- Family: Mustelidae
- Genus: Lutra
- Subgenus: Aonyx
- Species: A. capensis
- Subspecies: A. c. capensis

Trinomial name
- Aonyx capensis capensis Schinz, 1821

= Aonyx capensis capensis =

Subspecies of carnivore

The Cape clawless otter (Aonyx capensis capensis) is a subspecies of African clawless otter found in sub-Saharan Africa near permanent bodies of freshwater and along the seacoast. It is the largest of the Old World otters and the third largest otter after the giant otter (Pteronura brasiliensis) and the sea otter (Enhydra lutris).

== Physical description ==
The Cape clawless otter has a massive body and a stout tail for an otter. It reaches 72–91 cm in length and 12–21 kg. The upper lips, sides of the face, neck, throat, belly, and edge of ears are all white while the rest of the coat is brown. The eyes and ears are small and rounded. The coat is dense with hairs that can reach 25 mm in length covering a layer of thick skin. As noted by the name, the toes are clawless except for digits 2, 3, and 4 of the hind feet, which have small grooming claws. The hind feet are partially webbed, but the front feet are not, the least interdigital webbing of all otters. Notably, the skull is quite large, housing a larger brain in relation to its body.

== Taxonomy and phylogeny ==
As a subspecies of Aonyx capensis, Cape clawless otters are within the subfamily of Lutrinae (otters). The closest relatives to Aonyx capensis are the Asian small-clawed otter (Aonyx cinereus) and the smooth-coated otter (Lutrogale perspicillata).

== Range ==
The Cape clawless otter is found in freshwater habitats that range from South Africa northward to Ethiopia in the east and Senegal in the west. This species is common in Eswatini, Guinea, Kenya, Liberia, Malawi, Mozambique, Senegal, South Africa, Tanzania, Zaire, and Zimbabwe. It is rare in Angola, Benin, Botswana, Burkina Faso, Chad, Guinea-Bissau, Ivory Coast, Sierra Leone and Uganda. It is very or extremely rare in the Central African Republic, Ethiopia, Ghana, Lesotho, Namibia, Niger, Nigeria, and Rwanda. It is absent in ecosystems in the central African rain forest region of the Congo Basin where A. congicus, the Congo clawless otter, is found.

== Behavior ==
Cape clawless otters are primarily solitary creatures, but have been seen to travel in family groups. Their density in freshwater habitats ideally reaches 1 otter per 2–3 km of stream. During the day, they typically escape the heat of the sun by hiding in dense vegetation on islands or burrowing. Burrows can reach up to 3 m in depth and have several entrances above or below water. Dens or burrows include rolling places, spots on the ground where the otter rolls to dry its fur, as well as multiple sprainting sites. Dens may be reused by several otters in a family group or at separate times.

The breeding season starts around December and, with a gestation period of 63 days, litters can be born beginning in February. Litter size is 1–3 pups that are born with pale, smoky-gray, wooly fur. Eye-opening for the pups is seen in 16–30 days, after which pups are able to venture out of the den. Weaning occurs at 45–60 days and the young become fully independent of the mother after 1 year.

As with most otters, this species has an elaborate vocal repertoire that includes four main vocalizations: two whistles (one low-pitched and one high-pitched), a grunt, and a variable noise described as a "Hah!" to express anxiety. Growls and snarls may be given as threats while humming-like noises may be used as a begging call in the pups. Other sounds may include squeals, mewing, and snuffing noises.

When not hunting, they typically emerge from the water to rest upon the shore. Rolling and rubbing is done to dry and groom the fur or to scent-mark areas. Otters usually bask in the sun or can return undercover to sleep.

Walking on land is awkward for Cape clawless otters so they are observed to either walk slowly or do a seal-like trot. The tail can either be carried off the ground with its tip curving upwards, or dragged on the ground leaving a distinct trail. These otters are able to carry objects or prey while walking on land by holding them against the chest with one paw while hobbling on three legs. Carrying offspring on land may result in the female using both front feet to carry the young and then hobbling on its back legs. Due to their awkwardness on land, Cape clawless otters typically spend most of their time traveling in the water.

== Feeding ==
In freshwater habitats, the main sources of food are crabs, frogs, insects, and fish. Although crabs are available in all of their habitats, other prey in their diet may vary seasonally and change with prey availability. Due to this seasonal change, the Cape clawless otter usually is seen to consume more fish in the winter (10–30%) than in the summer (0–10%). Predation on waterfowl is rarely seen, but in the winter theyt have been seen to kill domestic ducks, geese, coots, and swans.

== Conservation status ==
The Cape clawless otter is not under severe pressure and its conservation status is Red List Category Near Threatened, as assessed in 2014 by the IUCN. Human conflict with this species is mainly from changes in habitat due to fishing, water pollution, agriculture run-off, and the introduction of Louisiana crayfish, which has altered the prey base in the otter's ecosystem. Cape clawless otters can be hunted for their pelts, used for medicinal purposes, and in some areas killed as a perceived competitor for fish. This species is legally protected by the IUCN, but extra efforts towards awareness and protected areas are highly encouraged for local communities. Natural predators of the Cape clawless otter include crocodiles and fish-eagles; however, most mortality is human-caused.
