= Siamogale =

Siamogale Temporal range: Late Miocene-Early Pliocene, 11–5.333 Ma

Scientific classification
- Kingdom: Animalia
- Phylum: Chordata
- Class: Mammalia
- Order: Carnivora
- Family: Mustelidae
- Subfamily: Lutrinae
- Genus: †Siamogale; Ginsburg, Ingavat & Tassy, 1983

Species
- †S. melilutra (Wang et al. 2017); †S. thailandica (Ginsburg, Ingavat & Tassy, 1983); †S. bounosa (Grohé et al. 2020)

Extinct genus of carnivores

Siamogale is an extinct genus of giant otter from the Late Miocene to Early Pliocene of eastern Asia. Three species are currently known, S. thailandica and S. bounosa from Thailand and S. melilutra from China.

== Palaeoecology ==
Analysis of the functional morphology of the postcranium of S. melilutra suggests that it occupied a similar ecological niche to the present day Aonyx: a shoreline forager that often moved about on land. It would have been more inhibited by drag when moving through water relative to other otters.
