= Enhydra macrodonta =

Enhydra macrodonta Temporal range: Mid Pleistocene

Scientific classification
- Domain: Eukaryota
- Kingdom: Animalia
- Phylum: Chordata
- Class: Mammalia
- Order: Carnivora
- Family: Mustelidae
- Genus: Enhydra
- Species: †E. macrodonta

Binomial name
- †Enhydra macrodonta (Kilmer, 1972)

Extinct species of otter

Enhydra macrodonta, the large-toothed sea otter, is an extinct mustelid known from the middle Pleistocene in California.

== Description ==
The large-toothed sea otter is a close relative of the living sea otter. As its name implies, it is distinguishable from the modern sea otter by its larger, more robust teeth.

Fossils of the large-toothed sea otter are dated to between 700 and 500 ka.
