= Siamogale melilutra =

Siamogale melilutra Temporal range: Late Miocene, 11–5.333 Ma

Scientific classification
- Kingdom: Animalia
- Phylum: Chordata
- Class: Mammalia
- Order: Carnivora
- Family: Mustelidae
- Genus: †Siamogale
- Species: †S. melilutra

Binomial name
- †Siamogale melilutra Wang, Grohé, Su, White, Ji, Kelley, You & Yang, 2017

Extinct species of carnivore

Siamogale melilutra is an extinct species of giant otter from the late Miocene from Yunnan province, China.

Ranking among the largest fossil otters, Siamogale represents a feeding ecomorphology with no living analog. Its giant size and high mandibular strength confer shell-crushing capability matched only by other extinct molluscivores, such as the bear-like marine stem-pinniped Kolponomos.

== Taxonomy ==
The skull reveals a combination of otter-like and badger-like cranial and dental characteristics. The new species belongs to the Lutrinae because of its possession of a large infraorbital canal and ventral expansion of the mastoid process, among other traits. Siamogale melilutra was about 1.9 m (6.25 ft) in overall length and weighed at least 40 kg (88 pounds). The remains of the skull were found in China and were re-created with a CT scan which enabled the skeleton to be reconstructed without damaging it.
