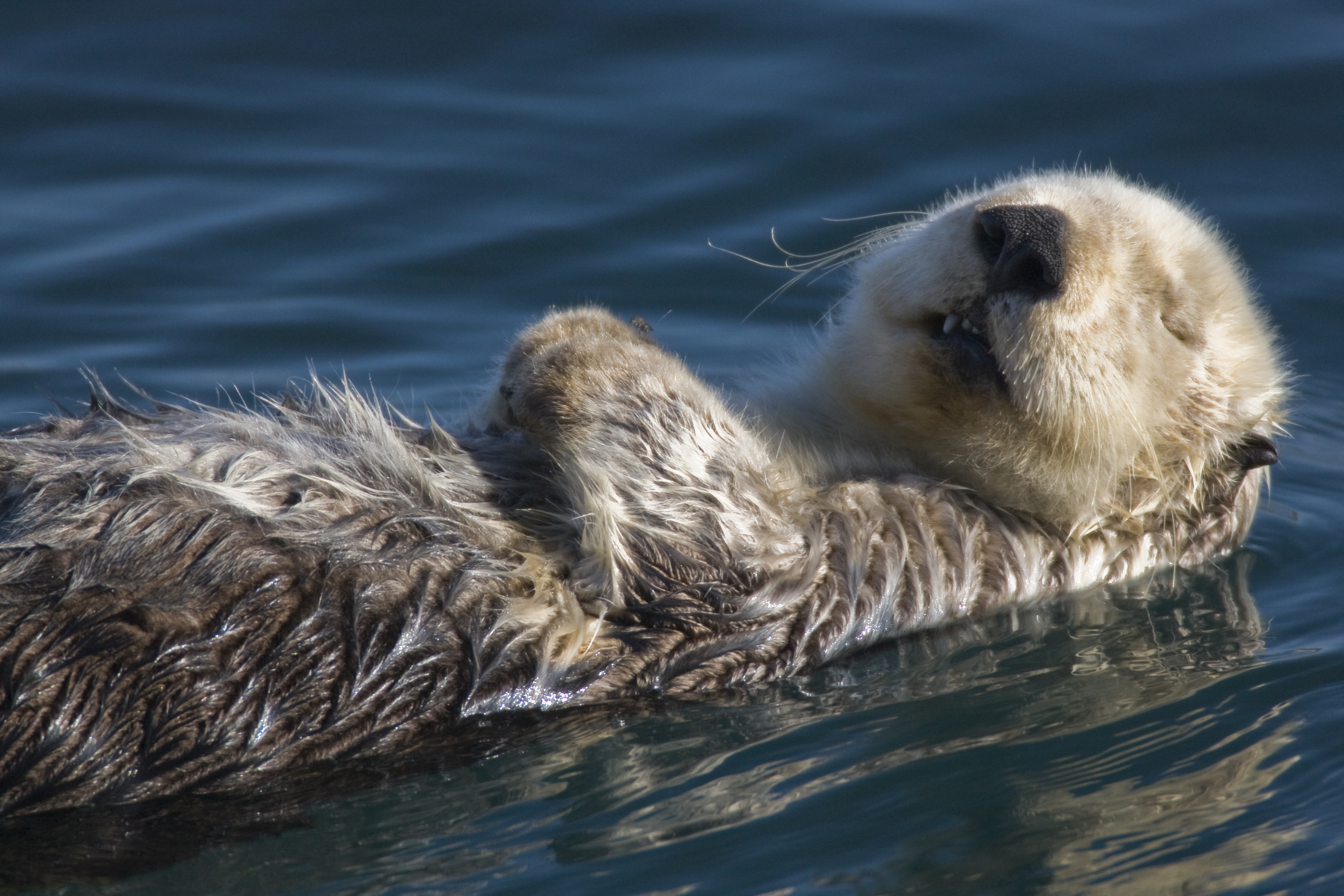
- Sea otter (Enhydra lutris)

Scientific classification
- Kingdom: Animalia
- Phylum: Chordata
- Class: Mammalia
- Infraclass: Placentalia
- Order: Carnivora
- Family: Mustelidae
- Subfamily: Lutrinae
- Genus: Enhydra; Fleming, 1828

Species
- Enhydra lutris - Sea otter †Enhydra macrodonta †Enhydra reevei

= Enhydra =

Enhydra Temporal range: 5–0 Ma Pliocene – Recent

Genus of mammals

Enhydra is a genus of mustelid that contains the sea otter and two extinct relatives. It is the only extant genus of the bunodont otters group, referring to otters with non-blade carnassials with rounded cusps.

Sea otters probably diverged from other otters during the Pliocene, approximately 5 mya. They probably arose from the closely related Enhydritherium, a bunodont otter endemic to North America during the late Miocene and early Pliocene epochs.

Enhydra reevei, the oldest known species, has its origins in the Atlantic, suggesting this may have been where sea otters originated. Fossil evidence indicates the Enhydra lineage became isolated in the North Pacific approximately 2 million years ago, giving rise to the now-extinct Enhydra macrodonta and the modern sea otter.
