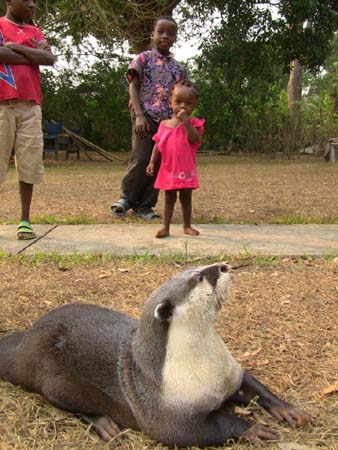

Conservation status
- Near Threatened (IUCN 3.1)
- CITES Appendix II

Scientific classification
- Kingdom: Animalia
- Phylum: Chordata
- Class: Mammalia
- Infraclass: Placentalia
- Order: Carnivora
- Family: Mustelidae
- Genus: Lutra
- Subgenus: Aonyx
- Species: L. congica

Binomial name
- Lutra congica (Lönnberg, 1910)
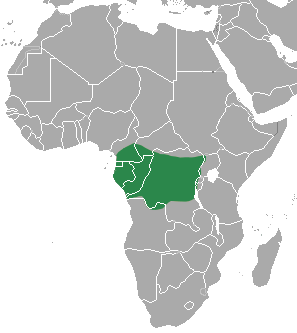
- Congo clawless otter range

= Congo clawless otter =

Species of carnivore

The Congo clawless otter (Lutra congica), also known as the Cameroon clawless otter, is a species in the family Mustelidae. It was formerly recognised as a subspecies (Aonyx capensis congicus) of the African clawless otter.

This clawless otter is found in Angola, Cameroon, Central African Republic, Republic of the Congo, Democratic Republic of the Congo, Equatorial Guinea, Gabon, Rwanda, Uganda, and possibly Burundi and Nigeria. Its natural habitats are subtropical or tropical moist lowland forest, subtropical or tropical mangrove forest, subtropical or tropical swamps, subtropical or tropical moist montane forest, subtropical or tropical moist shrubland, subtropical or tropical seasonally wet or flooded lowland grassland, rivers, intermittent rivers, shrub-dominated wetlands, swamps, freshwater lakes, intermittent freshwater lakes, freshwater marshes, intermittent freshwater marshes, freshwater spring, inland deltas, saline lakes, intermittent saline lakes, saline marshes, intermittent saline marshes, shallow seas, subtidal aquatic beds, rocky shores, sandy shores, estuarine waters, intertidal flats, intertidal marshes, coastal saline lagoons, coastal freshwater lagoons, water storage areas, ponds, aquaculture ponds, seasonally flooded agricultural land, and canals and ditches. It is threatened by habitat loss.

Very little is known about this species. It is a large otter and found only in the mid-part of Africa, in the tropical belt. It is believed to spend much more time on land than other otters. Congo clawless otters are one of 14 species of otters in the carnivore family Mustelidae. Other members of this family include weasels, wolverines, and ferrets. An individual otter maintains a territory. Otters mark their territories with scent, and fervently patrol and defend their territories.

== Description ==
Congo clawless otters are characterized by only partial webbing (between the toes of their back feet and no webbing on their front feet), and small, blunt, peg-like claws. They have very sensitive forepaws, which they use for foraging. Other otters have fully webbed feet and strong, well-developed claws. Clawless otters have slender, serpentine bodies with dense, luxurious fur and long tails. All otters have been exploited for their thick, velvety fur. Their head and body length measure to be about 600–1,000 mm (24–39 in), and their tail length is between 400 and 710 mm (16 and 28 in). These large otters can weigh between 14 and 34 kg (31 and 75 lb).

== Diet ==
Congo clawless otters feed on fairly soft prey items, such as small land vertebrates, frogs, and eggs.

== Reproduction and life span ==
Reproduction may occur throughout the year. Newborn cubs of A. congicus are white in color and do not reach their adult color of brownish white until about 2 months old. The clawless otter's life span is probably an average of 10–15 years.

== Threats and conservation ==
The Congo clawless otter is threatened by the anthropogenic alteration or degradation of riparian and freshwater habitats.

Although otters are known to be difficult to catch, they are occasionally hunted for bushmeat and sold for similar prices of other bushmeat. Otter bushmeat is common in Congo and Cameroon but not for Gabon because of its reputation of being dangerous. The myth in Gabon is that otters can give electric shocks when caught with a spear. Otters are also thought to be magical and possess powers that when you catch an otter, skin it, and wear its fur, you are thought to become invisible to an enemy and are able to escape an enemy. The idea comes from the otter's ability to escape fish traps. Its fur is also used in Cameroon to make drums.
