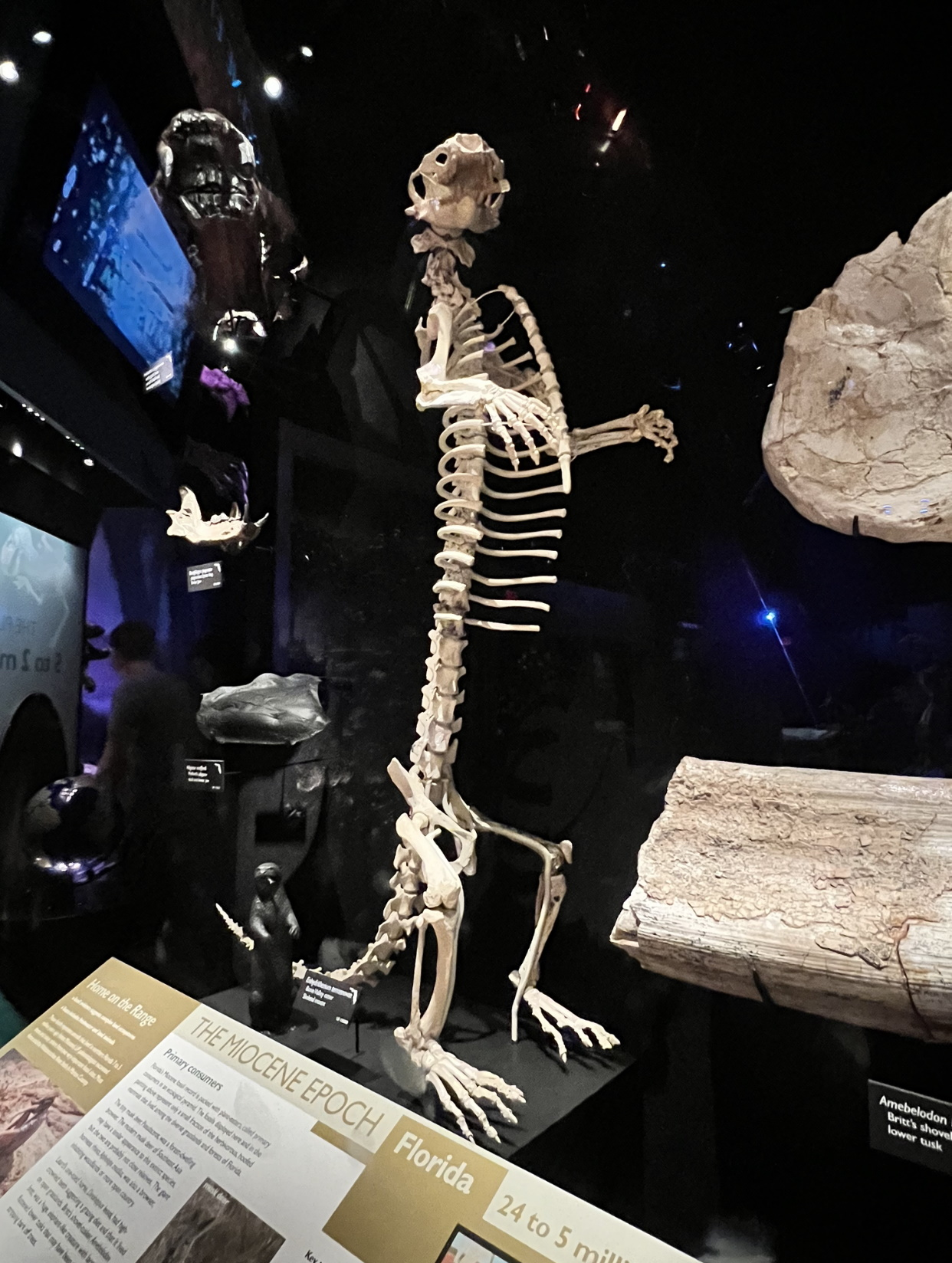
- E. terraenovae skeleton at Florida Museum of Natural History.

Scientific classification
- Kingdom: Animalia
- Phylum: Chordata
- Class: Mammalia
- Order: Carnivora
- Family: Mustelidae
- Subfamily: Lutrinae
- Genus: †Enhydritherium; Berta and Morgan 1985
- Species: †E. terraenovae

Binomial name
- †Enhydritherium terraenovae Berta and Morgan 1985

= Enhydritherium =

Enhydritherium Temporal range: Miocene–Pliocene

Extinct species of carnivore

Enhydritherium terraenovae is an extinct marine otter endemic to North America that lived during the Miocene through Pliocene epochs from ~9.1–4.9 Ma. (AEO), existing for approximately 4.2 million years.

The ancestral lineage of Enhydritherium terraenova can be traced to Africa and Eurasia, but no clear route of migration can be determined according to Thompson et al.

== Taxonomy ==
Enhydritherium terraenovae was named by Berta and Morgan in 1985 and is the genotype for this animal. Its type locality is the phosphate Palmetto Mine in Florida, which is in a Hemphillian marginal marine sandstone in the Upper Bone Valley Formation of Florida.

== Fossil distribution ==
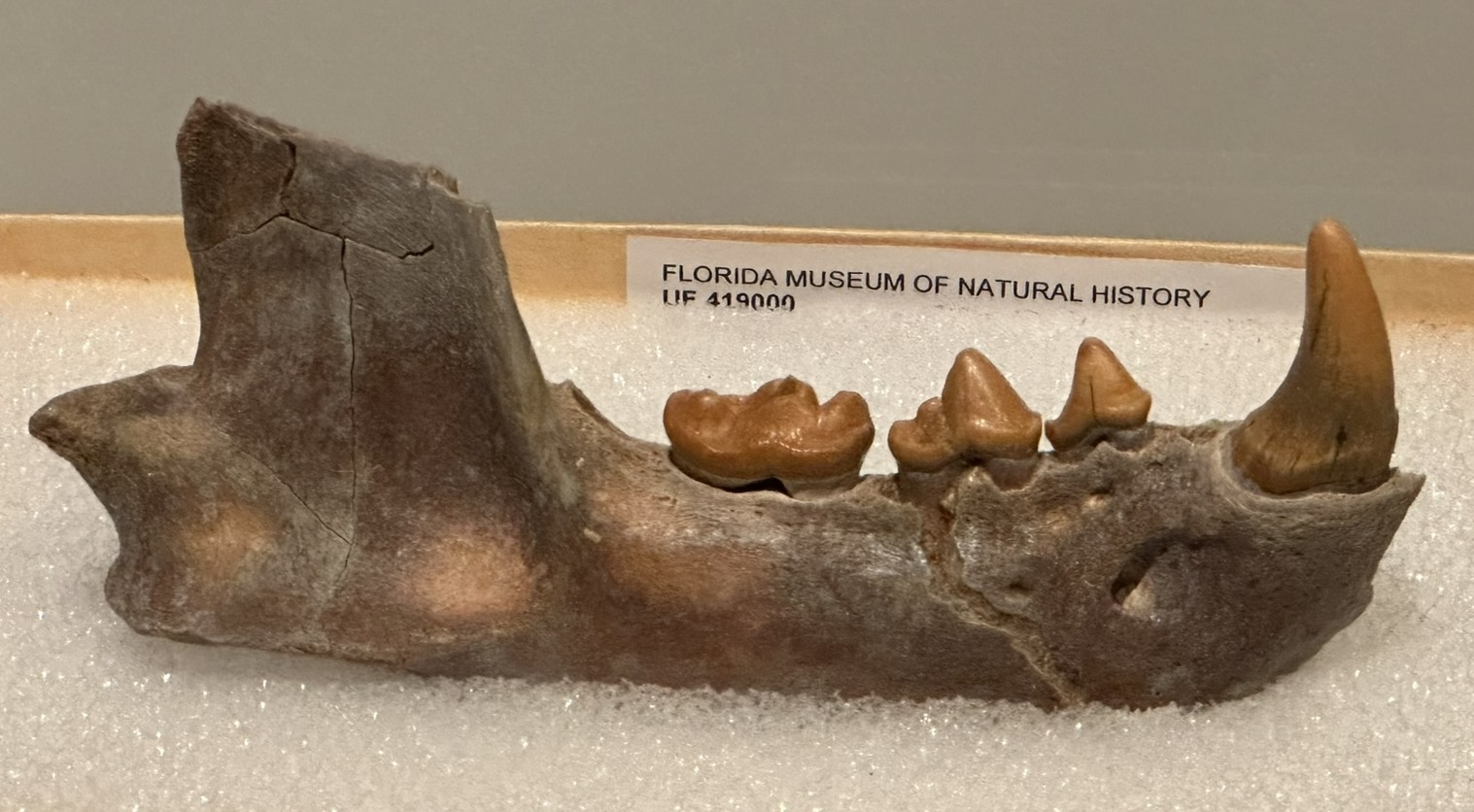
E. terraenovae jaw, Florida Museum of Natural History

Fossil specimens were found in California (3 sites) and Florida (8 sites).

In 2017, part of a jawbone was found in the Juchipila Basin, Zacatecas. Located about 200 km from the modern Pacific coast and 600 from the Gulf of Mexico, the finding suggests the animal migrated across the continent using fresh water corridors in central Mexico.
