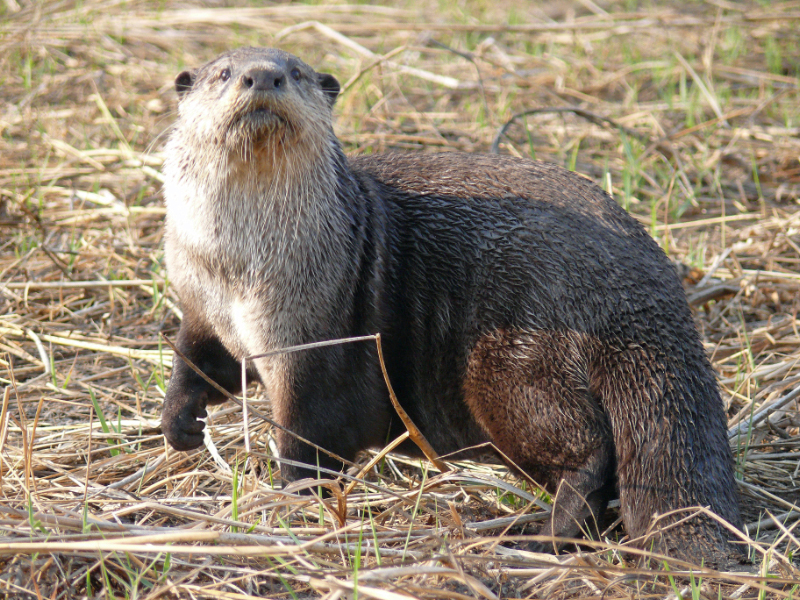
- Lutra capensis

Scientific classification
- Kingdom: Animalia
- Phylum: Chordata
- Class: Mammalia
- Order: Carnivora
- Family: Mustelidae
- Genus: Lutra
- Subgenus: Aonyx; Lesson, 1827

Type species
- Aonyx delalandi (Note: Type species by subsequent designation (Palmer 1904).) Lesson, 1827
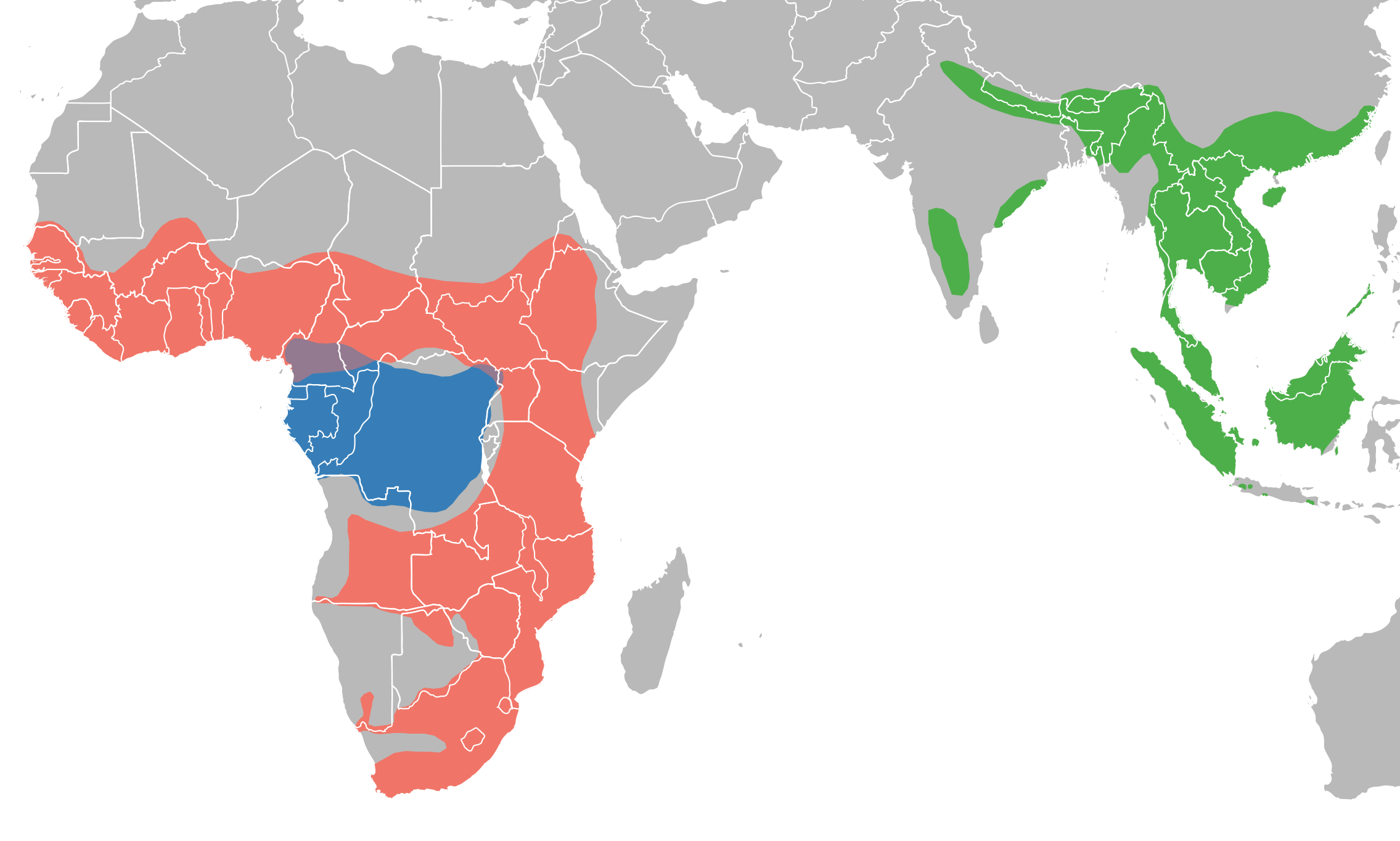
- Aonyx distribution A. capensis in red, A. congicus in blue (purple where overlapping), A. cinereus in green

Synonyms
- Anahyster Murray, 1860; Anonyx Agassiz, 1846; Leptonyx Lesson, 1842; Micraonyx J. A. Allen, 1919; Paraonyx Hinton, 1921

= Lutra (Aonyx) =

Aonyx

Genus of carnivores

Aonyx is a subgenus of otters in the genus Lutra, containing two species, the African clawless otter and the Congo clawless otter. The word aonyx means "clawless", derived from the prefix a- ("without") and onyx ("claw/hoof").

== Taxonomy ==
Two species are currently recognised:

Subgenus Aonyx – two species
Common name	Scientific name and subspecies	Range	Size and ecology	IUCN status and estimated population
African clawless otter	Lutra capensis Schinz, 1821 Five subspecies: A. c. capensis (Schinz, 1821); A. c. hindei (Thomas, 1905); A. c. meneleki (Thomas, 1903); A. c. microdon (Pohle, 1920); A. c. philippsi (Hinton, 1921)	sub-Saharan Africa	Size: Habitat: Diet:	NT
Congo clawless otter	Lutra congica (Lönnberg, 1910)	Angola, Cameroon, Central African Republic, Republic of the Congo, Democratic Republic of the Congo, Equatorial Guinea, Gabon, Rwanda, Uganda, and possibly Burundi and Nigeria	Size: Habitat: Diet:	NT
