= Propoecilogale =

Propoecilogale Temporal range: Late Pliocene-Early Pleistocene, 2.9–1.3 Ma

Scientific classification
- Kingdom: Animalia
- Phylum: Chordata
- Class: Mammalia
- Order: Carnivora
- Family: Mustelidae
- Subfamily: Ictonychinae
- Genus: †Propoecilogale; Petter, 1987
- Species: †P. bolti

Binomial name
- †Propoecilogale bolti (Cooke, 1985)

Synonyms
- Genus synonymy: Prepoecilogale Petter & Howell, 1985 (nomen nudum); Species synonymy: Ictonyx bolti Cooke, 1985; Prepoecilogale bolti Petter & Howell, 1985 (nomen nudum)

Extinct genus of carnivore

Propoecilogale is an extinct genus of mustelid that lived in Africa from the Late Pliocene to Early Pleistocene epochs, about 2.6–1.3 million years ago. The type and only named species, Propoecilogale bolti, was originally named as a species of Ictonyx in 1985. Two years later, it was determined that this species belongs in its own separate genus. Though the generic name has been spelled as Prepoecilogale in some publications, this spelling is considered a nomen nudum (published without an adequate description) and thus is invalid. The first known specimen, a nearly complete fossilized skull, was discovered between 1947 and 1948 in Pit 10 of Bolt's Farm, South Africa, which is referenced in the animal's specific name.

Because its fossilized remains bear great resemblance to the bones of the extant African striped weasel, Propoecilogale is believed to be very closely related to this animal, and is possibly its ancestor. The main differences between the two are characteristics of the skull and teeth, which are considered to be intermediate between those of the African striped weasel and the related genus Ictonyx. It is because of this similarity that Propoecilogale was given its name, which combines the prefix pro (meaning "before") with the generic name of the African striped weasel. The holotype skull of this prehistoric mustelid measures about 50 mm (2.0 in) in total length, suggesting this individual was similar in size to a modern African striped weasel, though a fossilized jaw of another individual suggests this animal may have been able to reach larger sizes. All known specimens of Propoecilogale show only elements of the skull or jaws, with no postcranial material preserved.

Based on its closest living relatives, Propoecilogale is believed to be a predatory animal, which may have put it in competition with mongooses living in the same areas and occupying a similar ecological niche as small mammalian predators. Assuming it had similar habits to modern mustelids, the ability to dig burrows and take down larger prey may have given it an advantage over these competitors, and it may have been nocturnal to avoid directly competing with the diurnal mongooses. Fossils of Propoecilogale are rare and often fragmentary, and have only been found in caves in South Africa. These localities represent forest-savanna mosaic environments, and span a period of time stretching from the Piacenzian stage of the Pliocene epoch to the Calabrian stage of the Pleistocene epoch. Additional remains from Tanzania and Morocco were once assigned to this genus, which was thought to indicate that the animal was very widespread across the continent, but further analysis has revealed that these likely represent different genera.

== Discovery and naming ==
Between 1947 and 1948, American paleontologists Frank Peabody and Charles Lewis Camp collected fossils from the cave breccia deposits in Pit 10 of Bolt's Farm, a site in Gauteng, South Africa, as part of the University of California African Expedition. Among these fossils was the nearly complete skull of a mustelid, which was sent to the Transvaal Museum and given the specimen number TM/BF201. In addition, paleontologist Donald Elvin Savage prepared a cast of this specimen, which was placed in the University of California Museum of Paleontology and cataloged as UCMP 19694. Neither the skull nor the cast would be studied until 1985, when South African-Canadian paleontologist Herbert Basil Sutton Cooke published a paper in which he described this specimen. He believed it most closely resembled the skulls of modern species belonging to the genus Ictonyx, but also differed significantly enough that it could not be assigned to any living species. Cooke therefore erected a new species which he named Ictonyx bolti, with the specific name referencing the location it was discovered, and the skull was designated as the holotype of this species.

In 1987, a study by Germaine Petter was published in which she analysed two fossilized mustelid specimens collected in Laetoli, Tanzania. One of these specimens (cataloged as LAET 248) was a partial skeleton with vertebral, skull and limb elements, while the other (cataloged as LAET 1358) only included jaw elements. Petter compared these remains with specimens of both modern and fossil mustelids and concluded that they represent the same species as the skull from Bolt's Farm named as Ictonyx bolti. In addition, Petter discovered that this species was actually more similar to the extant African striped weasel (Poecilogale albinucha) than any Ictonyx species, and thus does not belong in the Ictonyx genus. Due to differences in the teeth, she decided not to place it in the same genus as the African striped weasel, though she suggested it may be an ancestor of the modern form. Petter established the new genus Propoecilogale for the species, combining the prefix pro (meaning "before") with the generic name of the African striped weasel.

Additional specimens of Propoecilogale have been discovered after the genus was established. A 2008 paper reported that one fossil specimen of an African striped weasel was found in Cooper's Cave, South Africa. However, this specimen, a partial right mandible cataloged as CD 3896, was reassigned to P. bolti in a 2013 study. The authors of this study note that the Cooper's Cave specimen may represent a later evolutionary stage than the P. bolti specimens from Laetoli and therefore possibly belong to a separate species, but the scarcity of the material led them to make this assignment for the time being. In addition, a complete right mandible of P. bolti was reported in 2017 to have been discovered in the Kromdraai fossil site of South Africa, and was given the specimen number KW 7359.

=== Reclassified specimens ===
In 1997, French paleontologist Denis Geraads studied several fossilized mandible fragments found in Ahl al Oughlam, Morocco. He recognized that these remains resembled the P. bolti material from Bolt's Farm and Laetoli, and thus belonged in the same genus, but were too fragmentary and eroded to formally assign to the same species. Geraads therefore reported them under the designation Propoecilogale sp., cf. P. bolti. However, Geraads later reanalysed these remains and in 2016 he stated that they more likely represent members of either Ictonyx or Poecilictis. In addition, he suggests that the specimens from Laetoli should likely be reassigned to Ictonyx as well.

In 2025, Swedish paleontologist Lars Werdelin worked with French paleontologist Jean-Baptiste Fourvel to publish a review of the fossils that had been assigned to Propoecilogale. They concluded that although the specimens from Cooper's Cave and Kromdraai likely represent the same species as the P. bolti holotype from Bolt's Farm, all other attributed specimens should be reassigned to different genera. It was determined that the two specimens reported by Petter from Laetoli (LAET 248 and 1358) represent a previously unknown species of Ictonyx which Werdelin and Fourvel named Ictonyx harrisoni.

=== Spelling ===
The spelling of this animal's name has a somewhat confusing history. In 1985, Germaine Petter coauthored a book chapter with Francis Clark Howell in which she mentions that she will establish a new mustelid genus named Prepoecilogale, based on the fossil skull named as Ictonyx bolti by Cooke and new specimens from Laetoli. However, when the full description of this material was published two years later, there was no mention of a genus with this name. Instead, the aforementioned fossils had been described under the different genus name Propoecilogale, suggesting that Petter decided to change the spelling of the name. Since then, both of these spellings have been used in other publications by various authors, who have also attributed both references as the taxonomic authority of the genus. This was acknowledged by a study published in 2013, which clarifies that according to the International Code of Zoological Nomenclature, the valid spelling should be Propoecilogale because it was used in the original description of the taxon. Meanwhile, Prepoecilogale should be considered a nomen nudum because this spelling was established without a description.

== Description ==
Propoecilogale bolti is a small mustelid, with the holotype skull from Bolt's Farm estimated to have reached reached a total length of 50 mm (2.0 in) and a width of 31 mm (1.2 in) at the zygomatic arches when intact, though damage to the snout tip and zygomatic arches of the specimen means the true exact measurements cannot be known. This suggests that the holotype individual was comparable in size to the modern African striped weasel. Another specimen attributed to P. bolti, a lower jaw fragment from Cooper's Cave, indicates that this animal could grow larger than the size suggested by the holotype, though this specimen may represent a separate species in the Propoecilogale lineage leading towards the African striped weasel rather than P. bolti itself.

All known remains of Propoecilogale preserve only elements of the skull, with no postcranial material known. The skull exhibits features which have been considered intermediate between those of Poecilogale and Ictonyx, two living genera related to this prehistoric animal. The ear canal opens more laterally (facing sideways) than that of Poecilogale, though not as much so as in Ictonyx. The squamosal sutures are directed more laterally like those of Ictonyx, whereas these sutures are directed more anteriorly (facing forwards) in Poecilogale. The tympanic bullae (smooth, bulging protrusions on the tympanic part of the temporal bone) are not as inflated as those of Ictonyx, but wider than those of Poecilogale. The structure of these bullae gives the base of the skull a slender form more similar to that in Poecilogale than in Ictonyx. The upper dentition of Propoecilogale has a dental formula of 3.1.3.1, an ancestral characteristic identical to that of Ictonyx, but differing from that of Poecilogale in having an extra premolar. However, the structure of the protocone (one of the cusps) on the fourth upper premolar is more derived and similar to that of Poecilogale.

== Classification ==
Propoecilogale is a member of the family Mustelidae, and specifically belongs in the tribe Ictonychini. When fossils of the type species P. bolti were first described in 1985, they were attributed to the genus Ictonyx, the type genus of Ictonychini, under the name Ictonyx bolti. In addition, the tribe was assigned to the subfamily Mustelinae at the time. However, Propoecilogale has been recognized as a separate valid genus containing this species since 1987, and Ictonychini is now placed in the subfamily Ictonychinae alongside its sister tribe Lyncodontini. A 2024 study suggests that the two tribes diverged from each other during the Late Miocene epoch in Asia, and the Ictonychini tribe would have spread into Africa soon afterwards. The phylogenetic analysis conducted by Germaine Petter in 1987 recovered Propoecilogale to be more closely related to all other African members of Ictonychini than to any of the modern or prehistoric Eurasian members, and in particular was most closely related to the African striped weasel of the genus Poecilogale. The cladogram below shows the results of this analysis:

- - Ictonychini
    - - †Baranogale
      - - †Pliovormela
        - - †Oxyvormela
          - Vormela
    - - - †Propoecilogale
        - Poecilogale
      - - Ictonyx
        - Poecilictis

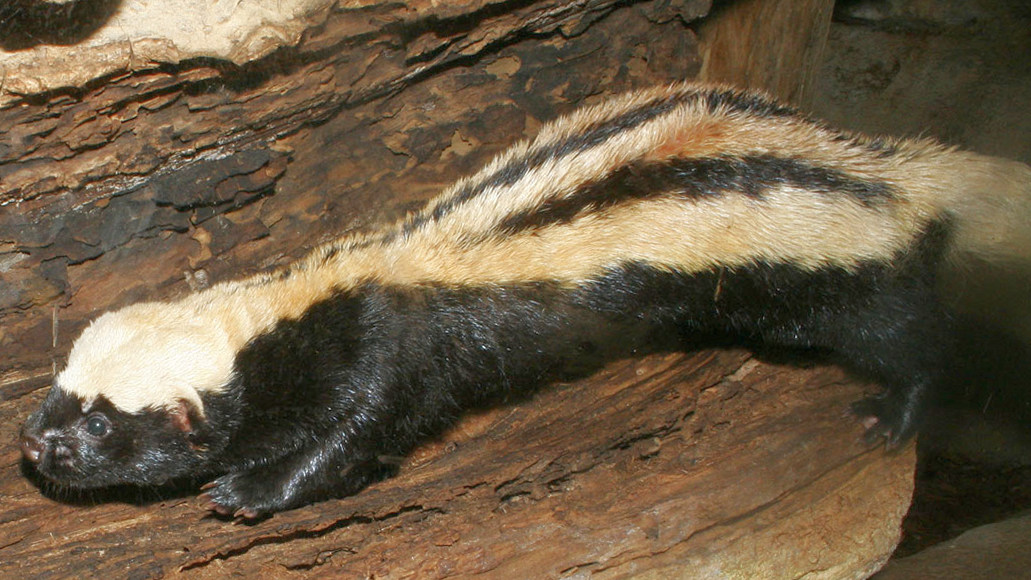
The modern African striped weasel has been proposed to be a descendant of Propoecilogale

Because it is so closely related to the extant African striped weasel, it has been proposed that Propoecilogale is an ancestor of this modern-day animal, an idea first brought up in 1987 by Petter. The African striped weasel exhibits derived features in its skull and teeth compared to the more ancestral condition retained in extant members of the genus Ictonyx. Propoecilogale shows features intermediate between these two conditions, likely representing a transitional form between the ancestral Ictonychini morphology and the more derived anatomy of the African striped weasel. In addition, a specimen attributed to Propoecilogale bolti from the Early Pleistocene deposits of Cooper's Cave has been noted to be very similar to a geologically older specimen from the Kromdraai fossil site, yet differs in certain details of the teeth. It has therefore been proposed that the two specimens represent a single lineage, with the dental structure evolving over time.

== Paleobiology ==
Because Propoecilogale is so similar and closely related to the modern African striped weasel, differing mainly in the details of its teeth, it can be inferred to have comparable habits with its extant counterpart. All species in the Ictonychini tribe are predatory animals, including the African striped weasel, though this weasel has a very specialized diet and feeds almost exclusively on small rodents, with birds being eaten occasionally and all other potential prey being rejected. This differs from the more generalist diets of other members of Ictonychini such as the striped polecat, which will eat a wide range of small animals and eggs. Propoecilogale was likely a predator as well, and its teeth show a mix of features similar to those of the African striped weasel and characteristics closer to those of the striped polecat, though the level of specialization in its diet has not been studied. In its natural habitat, Propoecilogale would have lived alongside various species of mongooses, which would have already been present in Africa at the time that this mustelid's ancestors first entered the continent. Mongooses occupy a similar ecological niche of "small predatory carnivore" as mustelids, and thus may have competed with them to some extent. However, mustelids like Propoecilogale may have had an advantage in that they can take on larger prey (including animals larger than themselves) and excavate burrows to breed in. In addition, African striped weasels are nocturnal, allowing them to minimize competition with the diurnal mongooses, and Propoecilogale may have had similar habits.

== Paleoenvironment ==
Fossils of Propoecilogale are rare, often only found as fragmentary specimens, and have been discovered in the South African caves of Bolt's Farm, Kromdraai and Cooper's Cave. All three caves are situated within the UNESCO World Heritage Site of the Cradle of Humankind, so named because this area bears fossils of early hominins spanning from the Late Pliocene to Late Pleistocene epochs. The rarity of this animal's fossils may be because its small bones are easily overlooked and difficult to preserve rather than a sign of the scarcity of the animal itself. Additional remains from localities extending as far north as Ahl al Oughlam, Morocco and to the Tanzanian site of Laetoli in the east were formerly attributed to this genus, and thought to indicate that it was very widespread across the African continent. However, these have since been reassigned to different genera, and Propoecilogale is currently believed to have been endemic to South Africa.

The first specimen of Propoecilogale to be discovered was found in the cave deposits of Bolt's Farm, South Africa, specifically from a locality referred to as Pit 10 or the Grey Bird Pit. The deposits of this pit have not been dated specifically, but the presence of teeth from the monkey Theropithecus oswaldi suggests they were likely formed about 1.3 million years ago during the Calabrian stage of the Pleistocene epoch, with a possible age range of 1.9 to 0.7 million years. A 2025 study gives an older estimate for the age of the Bolt's Farm specimen, claiming it dates back about 2.6 million years to the Piacenzian stage of the Pliocene epoch, which could make it the oldest known Propoecilogale specimen.

Additional fossils of P. bolti have been found in the Kromdraai fossil site. The remains were specifically reported to be from Member 2 of Kromdraai, though the stratigraphy of this site was revised in 2022, when the fossil-bearing units of the site were assigned letters, with Member 2 being renamed as "Unit P". Though the exact age of Unit P has not been determined, it is believed to be about 2 million years old, with a 2024 study on its bovid fossils suggesting an age between 2.9 and 1.8 million years, covering the Piacenzian and Gelasian stages of the Pliocene and Pleistocene epochs respectively. Analysis of the fossil content suggests that the Unit P fauna inhabited a mostly open, semi-arid grassland environment, as indicated by the abundance of grassland species such as francolins, buttonquails, and savanna-dwelling bovids. In addition, this environment would have had a gallery forest around a large permanent stream or river, based on the presence of forest-dwelling birds (such as a green pigeon, black sparrowhawk and the owl Glaucidium ireneae) and aquatic animals (such as the African clawless otter and ducks of the genus Anas). The most abundant bird in the Unit P fossil assemblage is the bald ibis Geronticus thackerayi, which would have nested on large rocky outcrops and cliffs, and the presence of juvenile remains indicates that such a structure over 10 m (33 ft) high was present.

Another specimen attributed to this genus is known from the nearby Cooper's Cave, a large cave system comprising multiple distinct localities, with this specimen originating from the locality known as Cooper's D. In 2009, a study using uranium-lead dating suggested that the Cooper's D deposits are about 1.5 to 1.4 million years old, dating to the Calabrian stage, with a more refined age estimate of 1.38 million years being proposed by a more recent paper in 2019. The fossil assemblage of Cooper's D indicates an environment similar to that of Kromdraai, dominated by open grassland while rocky outcrops and woodland were also present in the area. However, the absence of fossils representing water-dwelling birds at Cooper's D and greater abundance of open grassland birds compared to Kromdraai suggests that the environment of the Cradle of Humankind was drier during the Calabrian stage than it was in the Piacenzian and Gelasian stages.
