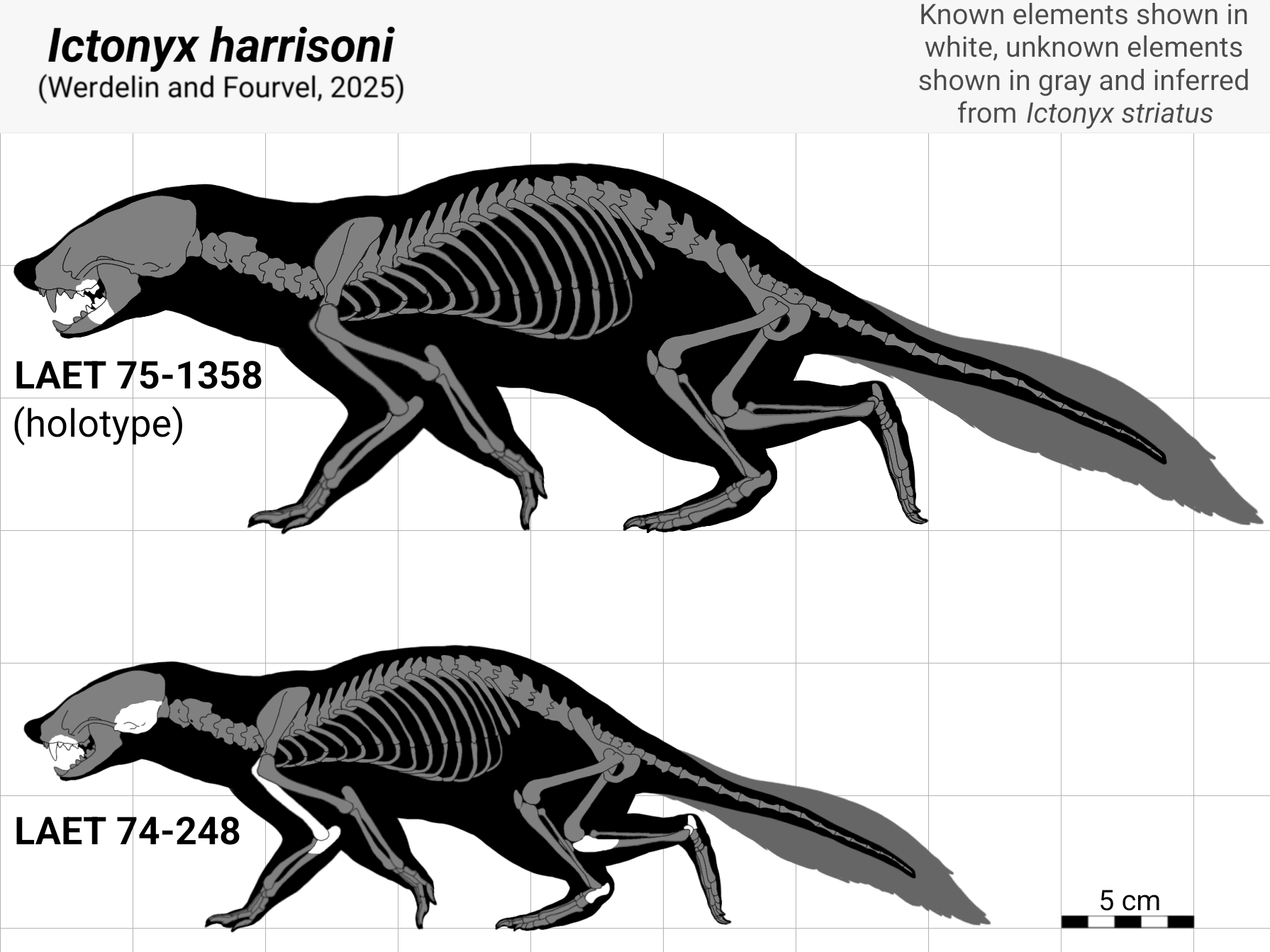
- Ictonyx harrisoni with known fossil material of the holotype (LAET 75-1358) and a specimen (LAET 74-248) with the unknown parts in gray which were inferred from the Ictonyx striatus.

Scientific classification
- Kingdom: Animalia
- Phylum: Chordata
- Class: Mammalia
- Order: Carnivora
- Family: Mustelidae
- Genus: Ictonyx
- Species: †I. harrisoni

Binomial name
- †Ictonyx harrisoni Werdelin and Fourvel, 2025

= Ictonyx harrisoni =

Ictonyx harrisoni Temporal range: Early Pliocene (Zanclean), 3.85–3.63 Ma

Extinct species of carnivore

Ictonyx harrisoni (meaning "Harrison's weasel claw", after anthropologist Terry Harrison) is an extinct species of mammal belonging to the Mustelidae family that lived in East Africa during the Early Pliocene epoch, about 3.85–3.63 million years ago. It is known from two fossilized specimens, both discovered at the site of Laetoli, Tanzania. These remains were first reported in 1987 as specimens of Propoecilogale bolti, but later analysis suggests that they represent a different form more closely related to the modern striped polecat, and so were redescribed as a separate species in 2025. The holotype specimen consists only of jaw elements, though the referred specimen is more complete, preserving material from the skull, limbs and vertebrae.

== Discovery and naming ==
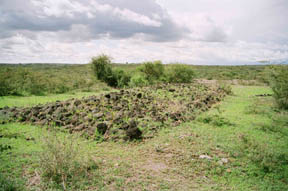
The Laetoli fossil site in Tanzania, where the specimens of Ictonyx harrisoni were found

Fossils of Ictonyx harrisoni were first discovered decades before the species was established. In 1987, French paleontologist Germaine Petter published a study which reported the discovery of two fossilized mustelid specimens in Laetoli, Tanzania. One of these (catalogued as LAET 74-248) was a partial skeleton with vertebral, skull and limb elements, while the other (catalogued as LAET 75-1358) only included jaw elements. After comparing them with the bones of both modern and fossil mustelids, Petter concluded that both specimens represented the same species as a fossilized skull discovered in Bolt's Farm, South Africa. Two years prior to the publishing of Petter's study, South African-Canadian paleontologist Herbert Basil Sutton Cooke published a paper in which he established the species Ictonyx bolti, with the skull from Bolt's Farm as the holotype specimen. However, Petter believed that this species differed enough from extant Ictonyx species to warrant being placed in a separate genus. She therefore established the genus Propoecilogale, renaming Ictonyx bolti as Propoecilogale bolti and attributed the two Laetoli specimens to this species.

In 2016, French paleontologist Denis Geraads pointed out that the aforementioned specimens reported by Petter differ in tooth structure from the condition seen in the P. bolti holotype, suggesting that the Laetoli specimens may not represent the same species as the Bolt's Farm specimen. Geraads further proposed that the Laetoli specimens may actually represent a species of Ictonyx instead, but does not officially reassign them as he had not studied the P. bolti holotype in person. The difference in tooth structure was also noted in a 2025 study by Swedish paleontologist Lars Werdelin and French paleontologist Jean-Baptiste Fourvel, who also noted that the Laetoli specimens are about a million years older than the P. bolti holotype, suggesting they are different species. Based on this, Werdelin and Fourvel redescribed the Laetoli specimens as a new species which they named Ictonyx harrisoni, with LAET 75-1358 being designated as the holotype of the species and LAET 74-248 as a referred specimen. The specific name honors Terry Harrison, an anthropologist who led many field campaigns to Laetoli. The generic name combines two Ancient Greek words, iktis (ἴκτις, meaning "marten" or "weasel") and ónux (ὄνυξ, meaning "claw").

== Description ==
Due to the fragmentary nature of the known fossils, little information can be gained on the size of Ictonyx harrisoni, though this species has been noted to be significantly smaller than the modern striped polecat. Although the full dental formula of this prehistoric animal cannot be known for certain, the maxilla (upper jaw bone) is known to exhibit a second premolar, as seen in the specimen LAET 74-248. This tooth is also present in the striped polecat but absent in the African striped weasel, suggesting that I. harrisoni is more closely related to the former. The fourth upper premolar has a forward-pointing protocone (one of the cusps), also similar to what is seen in the striped polecat rather than the African striped weasel. Furthermore, the crown of the first molar in the lower jaw is narrow when measured from side to side, and this tooth displays a long talonid and low metaconid (two of the cusps on the tooth). This makes it similar to that of the striped polecat, though the talonid is relatively shorter in I. harrisoni than in the modern species. The tympanic bullae (smooth, bulging protrusions on the tympanic part of the temporal bone) are preserved in LAET 74-248, and are slightly inflated, elongated and narrow, each bearing a carotid canal midway down their length and a long ridge near the border of the alisphenoid (a protrusion of the sphenoid bone). These ridges would have served as an attachment point for muscles. The mastoid process (a bony projection behind the ear canal) is indistinct.

While the holotype specimen preserves only jaw material, postcranial elements are known in the specimen LAET 74-248. The defining traits of I. harrisoni are features of the skull and teeth, with the postcrania exhibiting only characteristics typical of mustelids in general. The head of the humerus is wider when measured transversely than antero-posteriorly (front to back), and the upper part overhangs the greater tubercle. The other end of the humerus is widened, with the inner edge of the epiphysis protruding to its side. The diaphysis (bone shaft) of the humerus is curved at the upper end when viewed from the animal's side, and the crest-like attachment point for the deltoid muscle can be seen on the front of its surface. The ulna diaphysis is flattened from side to side, with the hind part compressed into a crest-like form. At the top of the ulna is a curved olecranon (elbow protrusion) with a rounded outline. Near the ankle end of the tibia, the internal malleolus (ankle protrusion) can be seen at the front inner corner of the articular surface. In the calcaneum, the front part of the articular surface is widened. The neck of the talus bone is well-developed and bends away from the inner edge of the trochlea (the pulley-like joint with the tibia).

== Classification ==
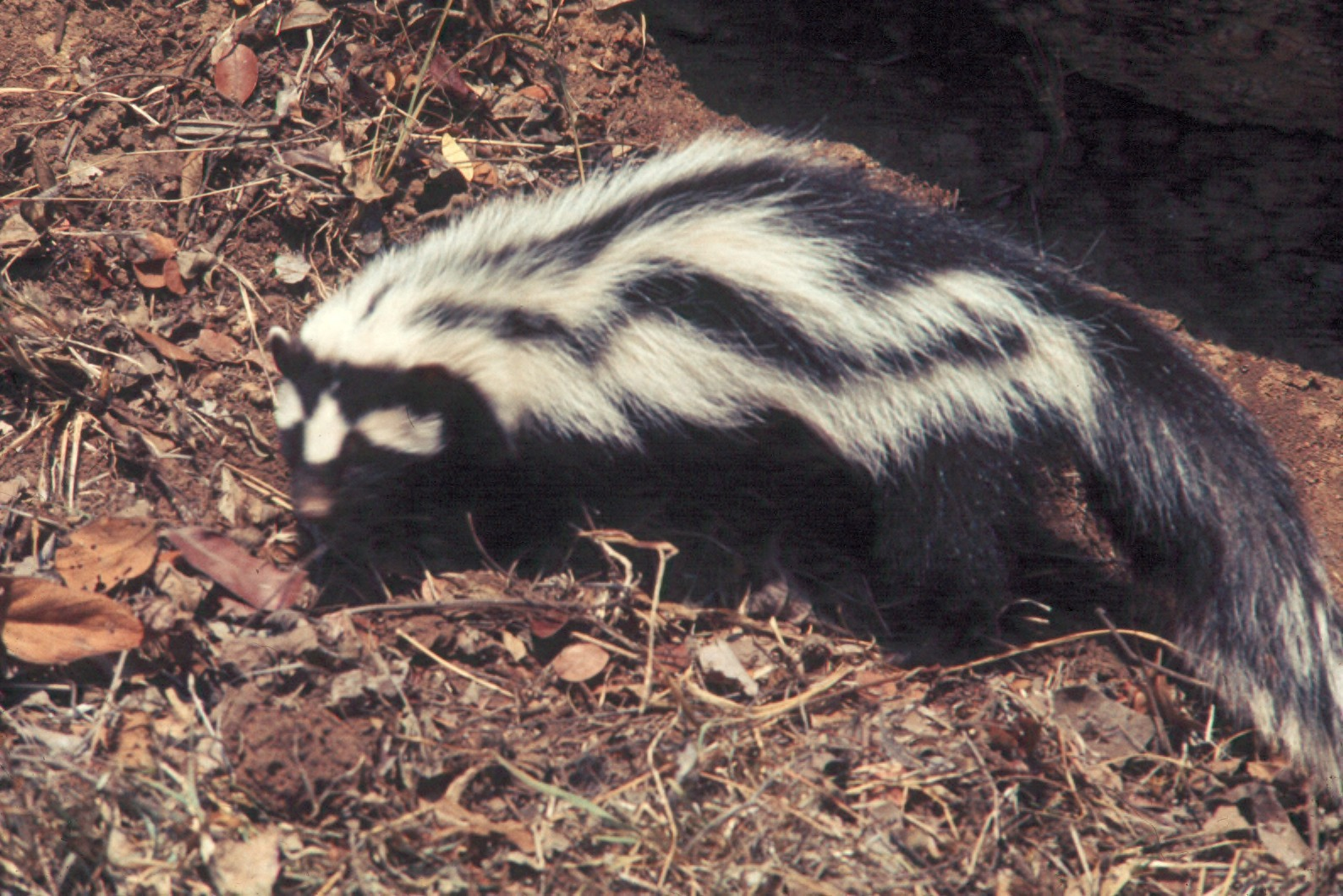
The striped polecat is believed to be the closest living relative of Ictonyx harrisoni

When they were first studied in 1987, the remains of Ictonyx harrisoni were mistaken for those of Propoecilogale bolti and attributed to that species. Based on the structure of its teeth, it was later determined that the closest living relative of I. harrisoni is the striped polecat, and the two species are placed together in the genus Ictonyx. This genus is assigned to the subfamily Ictonychinae (which it lends its name to) within the family Mustelidae. Members of Ictonychinae can be split into two tribes, namely Ictonychini and Lyncodontini, with Ictonyx being a member of the former tribe. Propoecilogale also belongs to the Ictonychini, making it a relative of Ictonyx. However, it is believed to be even more closely related to the African striped weasel of the genus Poecilogale, and may even be the direct ancestor of this modern animal. A 2024 study suggests that the two tribes diverged from each other during the Late Miocene epoch in Asia, and the Ictonychini would have spread into Africa soon afterwards.

== Paleoenvironment ==
All known fossils of Ictonyx harrisoni originate from Laetoli, Tanzania. Specifically, the remains of two individuals have been discovered in the Upper Laetolil Beds, which the use of argon-argon dating has shown were deposited between 3.85 and 3.63 million years ago during the Zanclean stage of the Early Pliocene epoch. The environment of the Upper Laetolil Beds during this time is believed to have been dominated by a mosaic of grassland, shrubland and open woodland habitats, and was mostly stable, although drier and more open habitats started to become more dominant towards the end of this stretch of time. This is supported by the fossil assemblage of the beds, which is largely made up of animals preferring open habitat such as bovids of the Alcelaphini and Neotragini tribes, rodents of the genera Pedetes, Saccostomus and Heterocephalus, grassland birds like francolins and guineafowl, and brood balls of dung beetles. The presence of woodland is evidenced by fossils of forest gastropods and tree-climbing monkeys of the genera Rhinocolobus and Cercopithecoides. Unlike many other Pliocene-aged fossil sites in East Africa, the absence of fossils of aquatic animals (such as crocodiles, hippopotamuses, fish or turtles) at Laetoli suggests it represents a drier environment with no large permanent bodies of water, although ephemeral rivers and ponds would have been present during the rainy season, and perennial springs would have been an important water source for animals during the dry season. The fact that most of the sediments of the Upper Laetolil Beds are volcanic tuffs suggests that ash falls would have occurred regularly at Laetoli, with the (currently extinct) Sadiman volcano being the likely source of the ash.
