= Martellictis =

Martellictis Temporal range: Pliocene

Scientific classification
- Kingdom: Animalia
- Phylum: Chordata
- Class: Mammalia
- Order: Carnivora
- Family: Mustelidae
- Subfamily: Ictonychinae
- Tribe: †Galictini
- Genus: †Martellictis
- Species: †M. ardea

Binomial name
- †Martellictis ardea Gervais, 1859

Extinct genus of mustelid

Martellictis is an extinct genus of mustelid that lived during the Pliocene epoch. The type species, Martellictis ardea, was initially classified as a species of Mustela and later as a species of Pannonictis or Enhydrictis before it was given its own genus in 2018.
