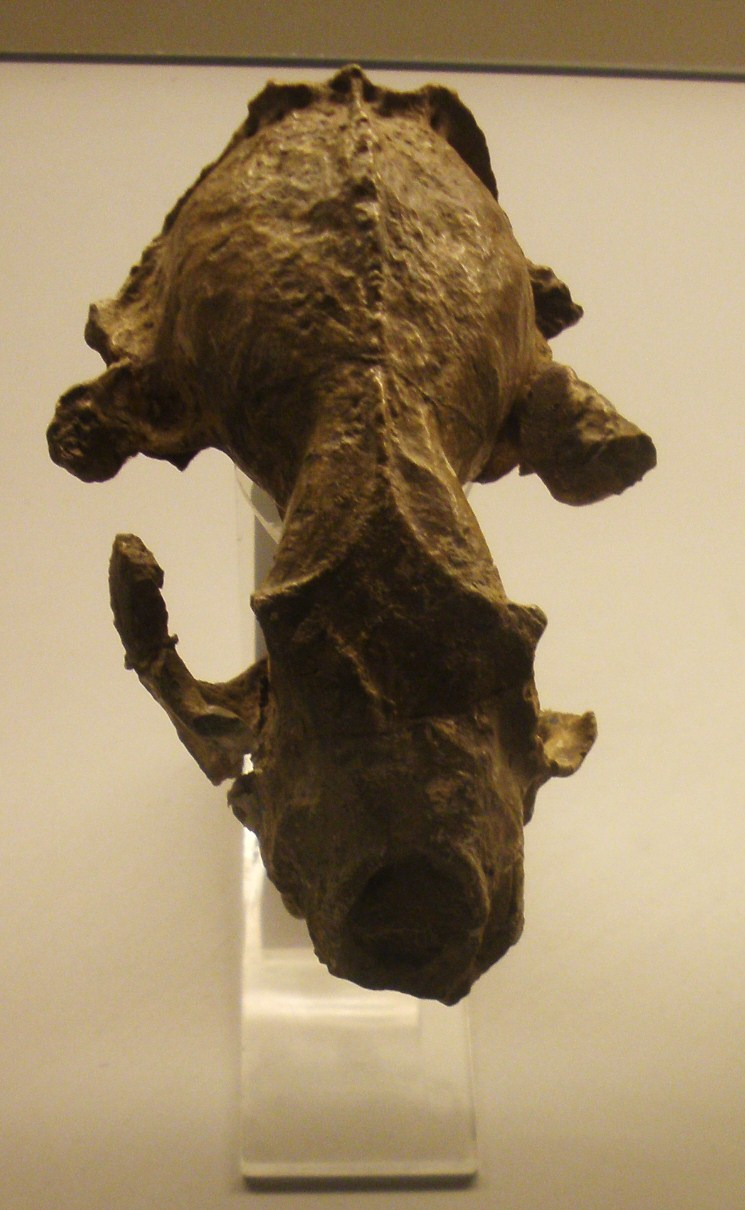
- Fossil of Enhydrictis galictoides

Scientific classification
- Kingdom: Animalia
- Phylum: Chordata
- Class: Mammalia
- Order: Carnivora
- Family: Mustelidae
- Subfamily: Ictonychinae
- Genus: †Enhydrictis; Forsyth-Major, 1902

Type species
- †Enhydrictis galictoides

Other species
- Enhydrictis praegalictoides Rook et al. 2018

= Enhydrictis =

Enhydrictis Temporal range: Early - Late Pleistocene

Extinct genus of mustelid

Enhydrictis is a genus of extinct mustelid, belonging to the subfamily Ictonychinae. The type species, and best known, is Enhydrictis galictoides from the Pleistocene of Sardinia and Corsica. Some authors attribute species from mainland Eurasia to the genus, but this is disputed, with others considering the genus endemic to Sardinia-Corsica.

== Taxonomy ==
The exact number of species of Enhydrictis has been a matter of debate. One species of Pannonictis, Pannonictis pilgrimi, has been classified as a belonging to Enhydrictis (as Enhydrictis ardea), although this is unlikely. A 2019 study also suggests that the genus Oriensictis of Asia should be considered a synonym of Enhydrictis as well. In 2016, a new species from Algeria was described. Known as Enhydrictis hoffstetteri, it is the first member of the genus known from Africa. Other scholars have considered the attribution of this species to Enhydrictis doubtful, and that the species should be placed in Pannonictis instead. In 2018 a new species, Enhydrictis praegalictoides, was described from Middle Pleistocene aged sites on Sardinia; it is likely ancestral to E. galictoides. The Corsica-Sardinian species of Enhydrictis are thought to have evolved from a Pannonictis-like ancestor.

Enhydrictis and its relatives are classified as belonging to the subfamily Galictinae and the tribe Galictini. While Galictini was widespread in Eurasia during the Pliocene and Early Pleistocene, the only extant members of the tribe, the grisons (Galictis) and the Patagonian weasel (Lyncodon), are endemic to Central and South America.

== Description ==
Enhydrictis galictoides was a fairly large, robust terrestrial mustelid. When first described, it was considered to be an otter-like species adapted to an aquatic lifestyle, but studies on the limb bones do not support such claims.

== Paleoecology ==
Before the arrival of humans on the islands in about 8000 BC, during the Middle and Late Pleistocene, Corsica and Sardinia had their own highly endemic depauperate terrestrial mammal fauna which included a species of dwarf mammoth (Mammuthus lamarmorai), the Tyrrhenian vole (Microtus henseli), the Sardinian pika (Prolagus sardus), the Tyrrhenian field rat (Rhagamys orthodon), one or two species of shrew belonging to the genus Asoriculus, a mole (Talpa tyrrhenica), the Sardinian dhole (Cynotherium sardous), three species of otter (Algarolutra majori, Sardolutra ichnusae, Megalenhydris barbaricina) and a deer (Praemegaceros cazioti). All of these species are now extinct.
