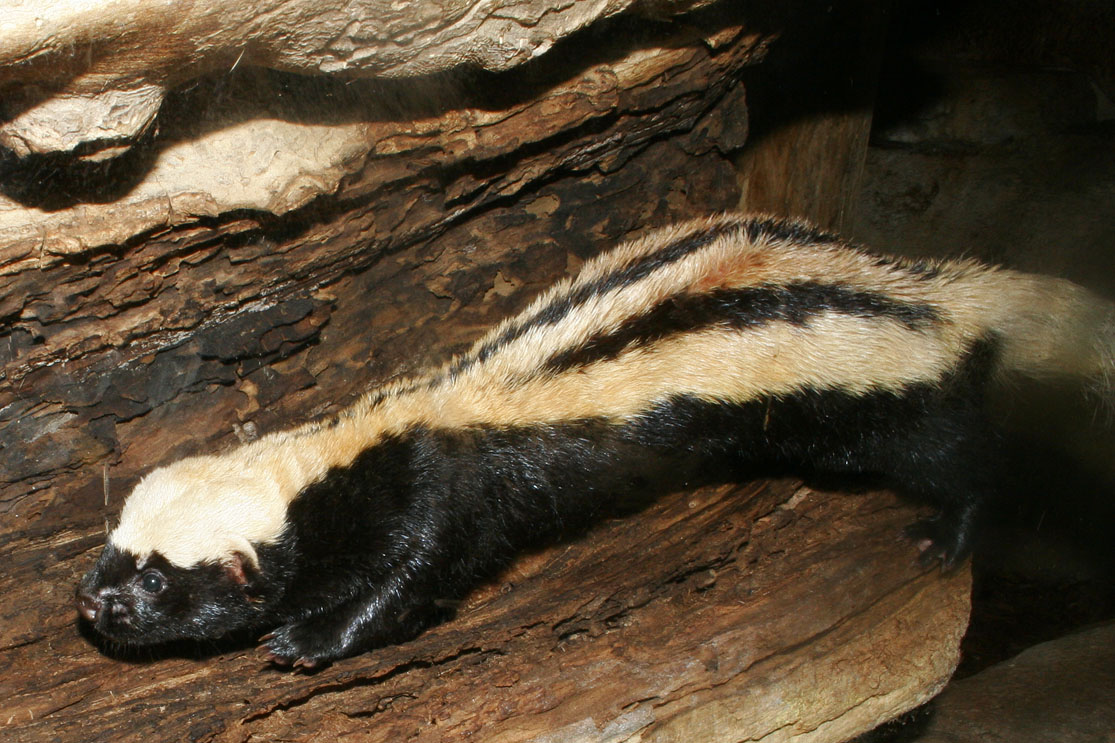
- Captive adult individual

Conservation status
- Least Concern (IUCN 3.1)

Scientific classification
- Kingdom: Animalia
- Phylum: Chordata
- Class: Mammalia
- Order: Carnivora
- Family: Mustelidae
- Subfamily: Ictonychinae
- Genus: Poecilogale; Thomas, 1883
- Species: P. albinucha

Binomial name
- Poecilogale albinucha (Gray, 1864)

Subspecies
- See text
- Range of the African striped weasel

Synonyms
- List: Zorilla albinucha Gray, 1864; Zorilla flavistriata Bocage, 1865; Zorilla africana Peters, 1865; Mustela albinucha Gray, 1865

= African striped weasel =

Species of mustelid mammal

The African striped weasel (Poecilogale albinucha), also known as the white-naped weasel, striped weasel or African weasel, is a small mammal native to sub-Saharan Africa, where its range stretches from as far north as Kenya south to South Africa. It is in the family Mustelidae and is the lone member of the genus Poecilogale. It has a long, slender body with short legs and a bushy tail. One of the smallest carnivorans in Africa, it measures 24 to 35 cm (9.4 to 13.8 in) long excluding the tail, with males generally larger than females. It has black fur over most of its body, with distinctive white bands running from the top of its head down its back, with the tail being completely white. The closest living relative of this species is the striped polecat, and it may also be related to the extinct Propoecilogale bolti.

The African striped weasel is most commonly seen in savanna and veld grasslands with termite mounds, but has also been recorded in semideserts, rainforests, fynbos and even areas used by humans such as pine plantations and agricultural land. It is a powerful digger and excavates burrows which it inhabits. Though not commonly seen, it has been listed as Least Concern on the IUCN Red List since 1996 because of its wide range and habitat tolerance. There are no known major threats to the species, though it is commonly used in local traditional medicine. Owls and domestic dogs are known to prey on it, and weasels sometimes die in fights against each other. This weasel generally flees from any perceived threats, but may try warding off its attacker with noises, fake charges or a noxious fluid sprayed from its perineal glands.

African striped weasels are specialized predators that feed almost entirely on rodents, though they occasionally eat birds as well. Even when hungry, they ignore other types of small animals and eggs provided to it as food. This animal commonly bites its prey in the back of the neck while rolling around or kicking the prey's back, likely in an attempt to dislocate the neck. Larger prey may instead be dispatched with bites to the throat, though only females have been observed doing this. This weasel rarely drinks water, only doing so in small quantities when the weather is hot. It is mostly a nocturnal and solitary animal, though small groups of up to four individuals are sometimes seen. Breeding takes place from spring to the end of summer, and two to three young tend to be born per litter after a gestation period of about 30 days.

== Taxonomy and evolution ==
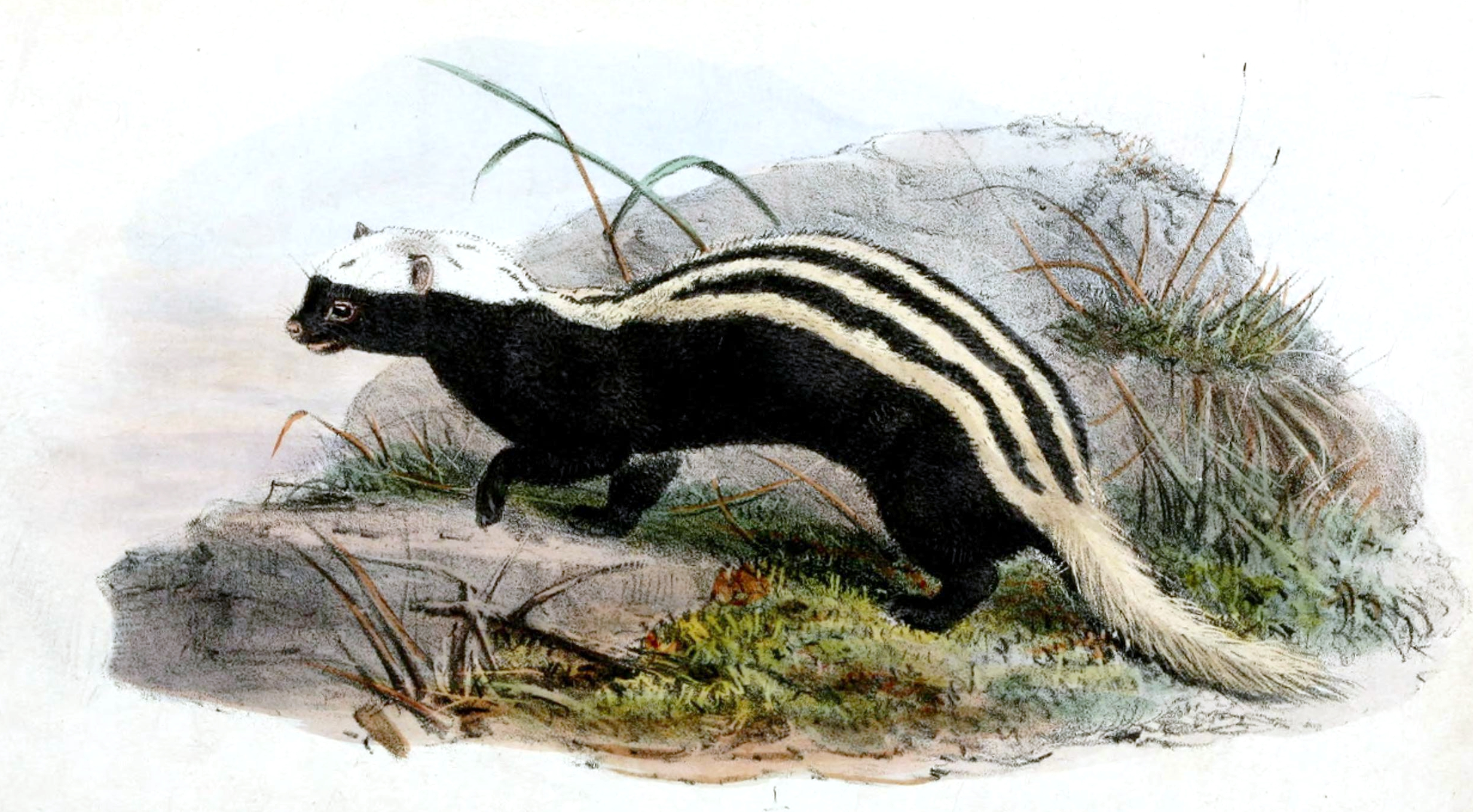
Illustration of an African striped weasel by Joseph Wolf published in the 1864 study which first described the species, labeling it as Zorilla albinucha

The African striped weasel was first described in 1864, when British zoologist John Edward Gray studied a skin of the animal purchased by the British Museum ten years earlier that was labeled as that of a "zorilla". He recognized that this skin was unlike that of any other known member of the mustelid family, and determined that it represented a new species which he named Zorilla albinucha. The specific name combines the Latin words albi meaning 'white' and nucha meaning 'nape'. Five years later, Gray published a catalogue of some of the mammal specimens in the British Museum, in which he moved the species into the genus Mustela as Mustela albinucha, commenting that it only has the colouration of a zorilla. In 1883, another British zoologist, Oldfield Thomas, noticed that the species had significant differences in the skull compared to any known mustelid genera. He therefore established the new genus Poecilogale, the sole included species being Poecilogale albinucha. The generic name is derived from the Ancient Greek words poikilos (ποικίλος), meaning 'particoloured' or 'cunning', and galē (γαλῆ), meaning 'weasel'. Thomas' study was based on five African striped weasel specimens, four of which were kept in the British Museum, with the remaining one in the Paris Museum of Natural History.

In 1865, German naturalist Wilhelm Peters reported two mustelid specimens from Golungo Alto, Angola. He described one of them as a new species which he named Zorilla africana, and thought the other should also be considered a variety of this species. However, Austrian explorer Friedrich Welwitsch told him that the latter specimen represents the species named a year earlier as Zorilla albinucha. Welwitsch believed that the two forms were consistently different, and that even the local indigenous population refers to them by different names. In the same year, Portuguese zoologist José Vicente Barbosa du Bocage studied two skins and a skeleton of African striped weasels from Calandula, Angola and proposed that the animal's scientific name be changed to Zorilla flavistriata. Both Zorilla africana and Zorilla flavistriata are no longer deemed valid names, and are now considered junior synonyms of Poecilogale albinucha.

=== Subspecies ===
A number of African striped weasel subspecies have been proposed during the 20th century, though there is debate as to how many of these are valid. Some authors believe that the species is monotypic and that all proposed subspecies should be considered invalid. The following five subspecies were recognized in the third edition of Mammal Species of the World, published in 2005:

Subspecies	Trinomial authority	Description	Range
P. a. albinucha (Nominate subspecies)	(Gray, 1864)	Black with yellowish-white dorsal stripes and white tail.	
P. a. bechuanae	Roberts, 1931	Larger than the nominate subspecies, with a green tinge at the front part of the white dorsal stripes.	Vryburg, North West Province and Randfontein, Gauteng, South Africa
P. a. doggetti	Thomas and Schwann, 1904	Similar in colour to the nominate subspecies but with longer lateral stripes compared to the middle stripe and a larger skull.	Uganda
P. a. lebombo	Roberts, 1931	Similar in colour to the nominate subspecies, but intermediate in size between it and P. a. transvaalensis.	Ubombo, KwaZulu-Natal, South Africa
P. a. transvaalensis	Roberts, 1926	Dorsal stripes are mostly ochre-buff instead of white like in the other subspecies.	Tzaneen, Limpopo, South Africa

=== Evolution ===
The African striped weasel is the only species in the monotypic genus Poecilogale, which belongs in the subfamily Ictonychinae within the family Mustelidae. Ictonychinae is divided into two tribes, Ictonychini and Lyncodontini. This species is part of Ictonychini, which it shares with the striped polecat, Saharan striped polecat and marbled polecat. Genetic analyses indicate that the closest living relative of the African striped weasel is the striped polecat, with the two being recovered as sister taxa in multiple studies. A study published in 2008 suggested that the lineages of these two species diverged between 2.7 and 2.2 million years ago, while a 2012 study proposed an earlier date between 4.3 and 3.4 million years ago. The following cladogram shows the position of the African striped weasel among its closest living relatives according to Gray et al., (2022):

- Ictonychinae
  - Galictis vittata (Greater grison)
  - - Vormela peregusna (Marbled polecat)
    - - Ictonyx libycus (Saharan striped polecat)
      - - Ictonyx striatus (Striped polecat)
        - Poecilogale albinucha (African striped weasel)

A fossil species, Propoecilogale bolti, was originally named as a member of the genus Ictonyx, but has been placed in a separate genus since 1987. It shows features in its skull and teeth that are intermediate between Ictonyx and Poecilogale, and has been suggested to be an ancestor of the African striped weasel. Fossil specimens of Propoecilogale have been found in the Late Pliocene and Early Pleistocene-aged cave deposits of South Africa, suggesting the animal existed between 2.6 and 1.4 million years ago.

== Description ==
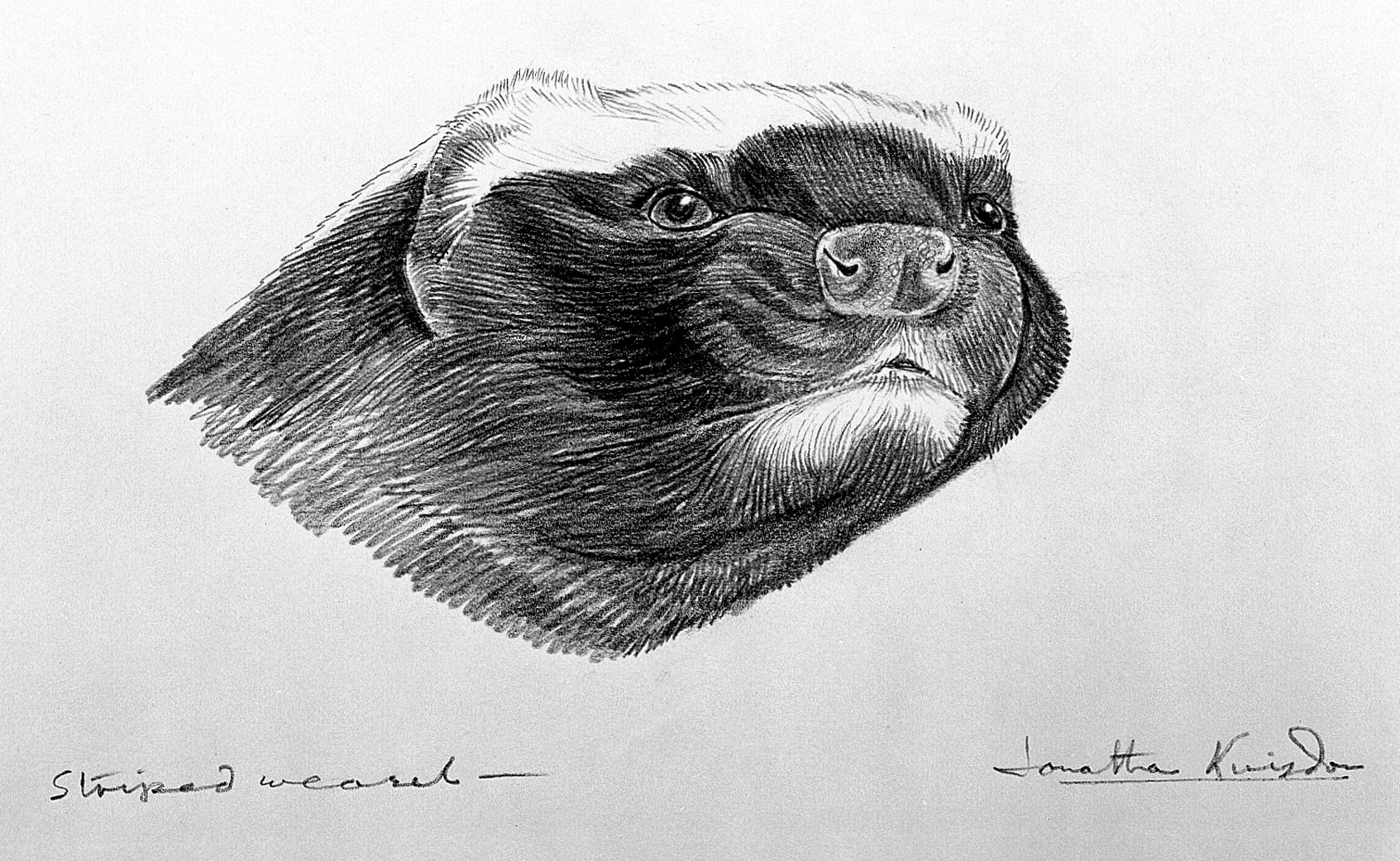
Portrait of the head of an African striped weasel

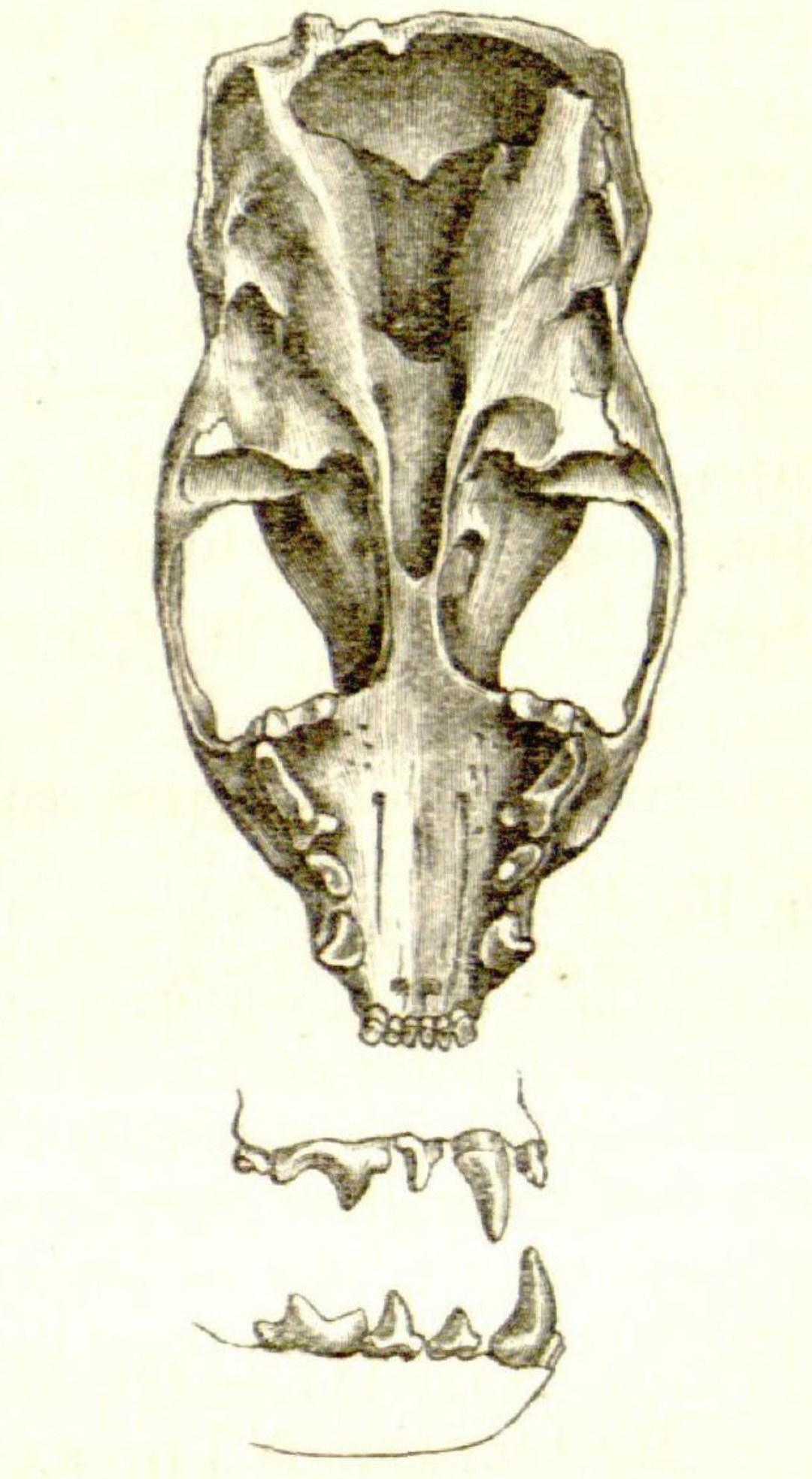
Illustration of the skull seen from below without the lower jaw (top) and the teeth viewed from the right side (bottom)

One of the smallest carnivorans found in Africa (along with the dwarf mongoose), the African striped weasel has a slender body and short legs, and is the proportionally longest mammal native to the continent. It has small eyes, a short, broad snout, and short, rounded ears. Adults have a head-body length of 24 to 35 cm (9 to 14 in), with the tail adding a further 13.8 to 21.5 cm (5 to 8 in). This species exhibits sexual dimorphism, with males being larger than females. Six males sampled in KwaZulu-Natal in 1978 weighed an average of 339 g (12 oz), and three sampled in the former Cape Province in 1981 had an average weight of 357 g (13 oz). In comparison, 251 g (9 oz) and 215 g (8 oz) were the average weights of females according to the same respective studies, with the former sampling six females and the latter sampling two. The fur is mostly black, with a white patch on the top of the head which splits into two and then four white to pale yellowish bands running down the back. The bands may change in hue and become darker, with those of one subadult recorded to change from white to a light honey colour within a time span of about six weeks, and those of a different individual in captivity were reported to change from light yellow to deep buff. Staining caused by the soil in its habitat may cause these bands to appear red, grey or yellow, particularly in periods of rain. The width of the bands varies between individuals; some specimens found in Botswana have bands reaching 1.5 cm (0.6 in) in width, whereas they only reach 0.7 cm (0.3 in) in others. The tail is completely white in colour and has a bushy appearance, with each of its hairs growing about 3 cm (1 in). In comparison, most of the body has hairs which are around 1 cm (0.4 in) long, and those on the limbs are only 0.5 cm (0.2 in) long.

The head is elongated, with the skulls of some females measured in 1951 reaching an average length of 5.13 cm (2 in) and an average width of 2.36 cm (1 in) at the zygomatic arches (cheek area). The lower jaw fits tightly into the jaw joint, which greatly limits its ability to move its jaw from side to side. The carnassial teeth are sharp, and the canine teeth are long. The dentition has a dental formula of 3.1.2.13.1.2.1, that is, three incisors, one canine, two premolars and one molar on either half of each jaw, for a total of 28 teeth. This differs from the striped polecat (its closest living relative) in having one less premolar on each side of each jaw and one less molar on each side of the lower jaw. The absence of those teeth is a derived trait differing from the ancestral condition retained by the striped polecat, as are some features of the cusps (projecting parts) of the first molar (namely the absence of a metaconid and the fusion of the metacone and paracone).

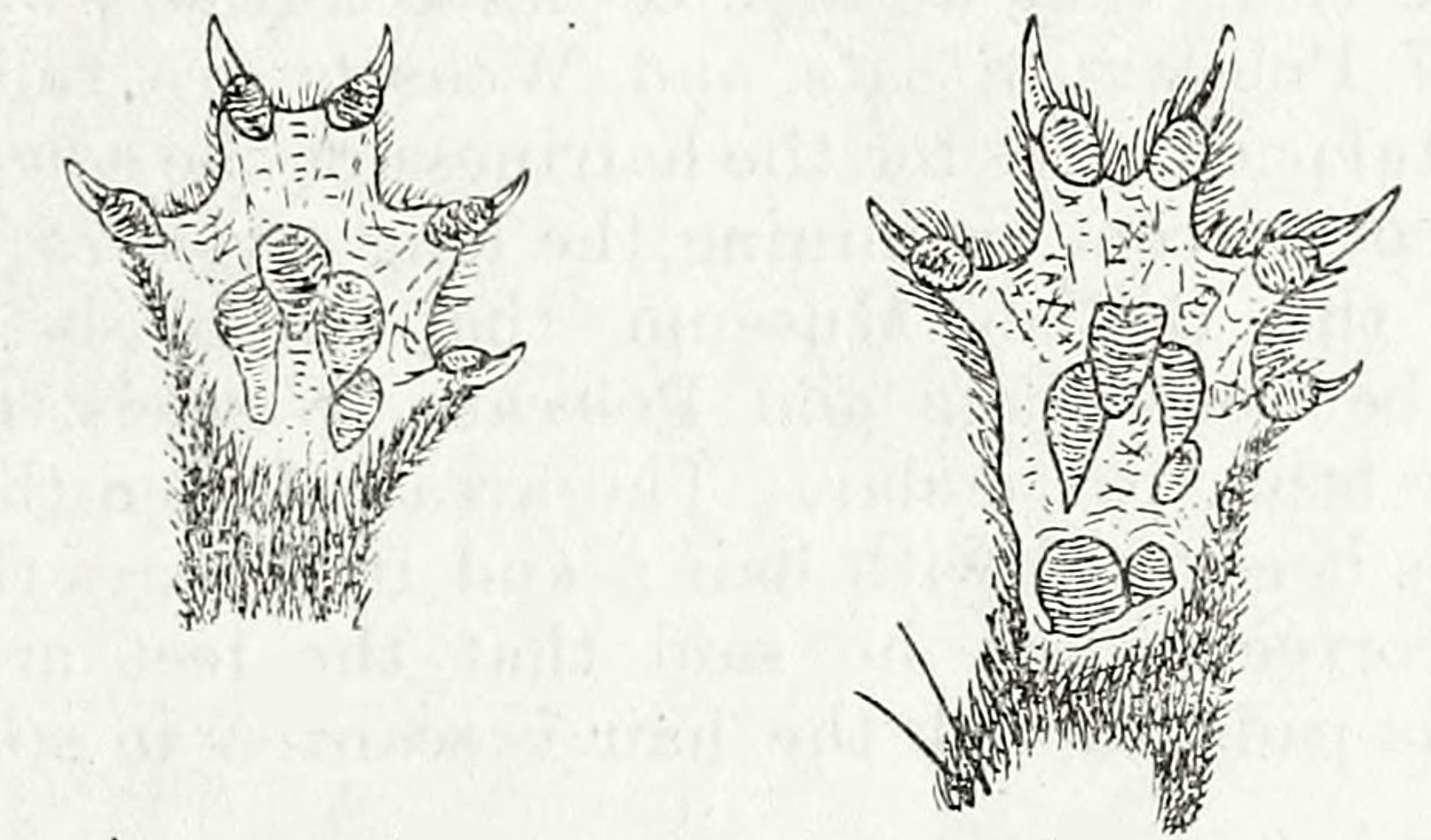
Illustration depicting the undersides of the hind (on the left) and front (on the right) right paws

Like other mustelids, the limbs of an African striped weasel each have five digits, with each digit bearing a sharp claw. The front claws are larger and more curved than the hind claws. Each digit has an oval-shaped pad on its underside. The undersides of the paws are mostly hairless, each one having a large, four-lobed plantar pad, with each front limb having two additional carpal pads on the wrist. In this aspect it differs from some mustelids (whose paws have hairy undersides) and is most similar to the Malayan weasel and back-striped weasel. However, the African striped weasel differs from these two species in having larger front claws and the third and fourth digits of the hind limbs being closer together. This makes it a rare example of a mustelid whose paws are intermediate in form between cursorial paw forms (adapted for running like in the Malayan and back striped weasels) and fossorial paw forms (adapted for digging like in the striped polecat). Females usually have four teats, though some have been found with six. Like many other mustelids, the African striped weasel has a developed pair of perineal scent glands.

== Distribution and habitat ==
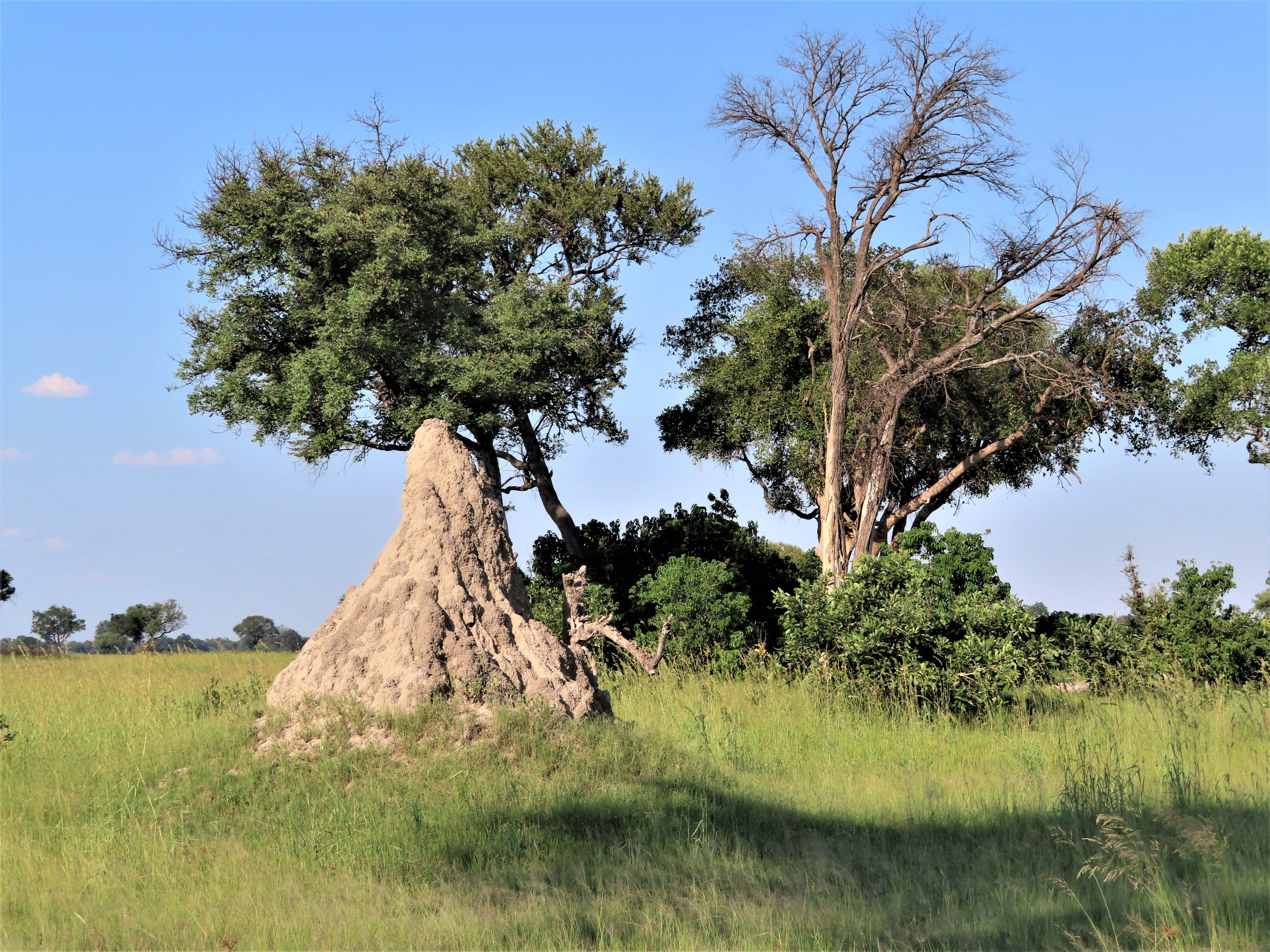
Open savannah with a termite mound in Botswana, the preferred habitat type of the African striped weasel

The African striped weasel inhabits much of Africa south of the equator, being found from the Democratic Republic of the Congo to Kenya in the north, and as far south as southern South Africa. It occurs in moist habitats with an annual rainfall of over 60 cm (24 in). It is often found in savannah and veld environments where termite mounds are present, with a 1978 survey revealing that 75% of African striped weasel sightings were made in such grasslands. However, the species appears to tolerate a wide range of habitats, having also been seen in semideserts, rainforests, fynbos and pine plantations, and roadkill carcasses have been collected in agricultural land. Considering the increase in sightings from regions formerly believed to be unsuitable for them (such as in southwestern South Africa in 1998), the weasel may be more widespread than previously thought. It commonly lives below 1,500 m (4,921 ft) elevation, but may occasionally be found as high as 2,200 m (7,218 ft).

== Behaviour and ecology ==
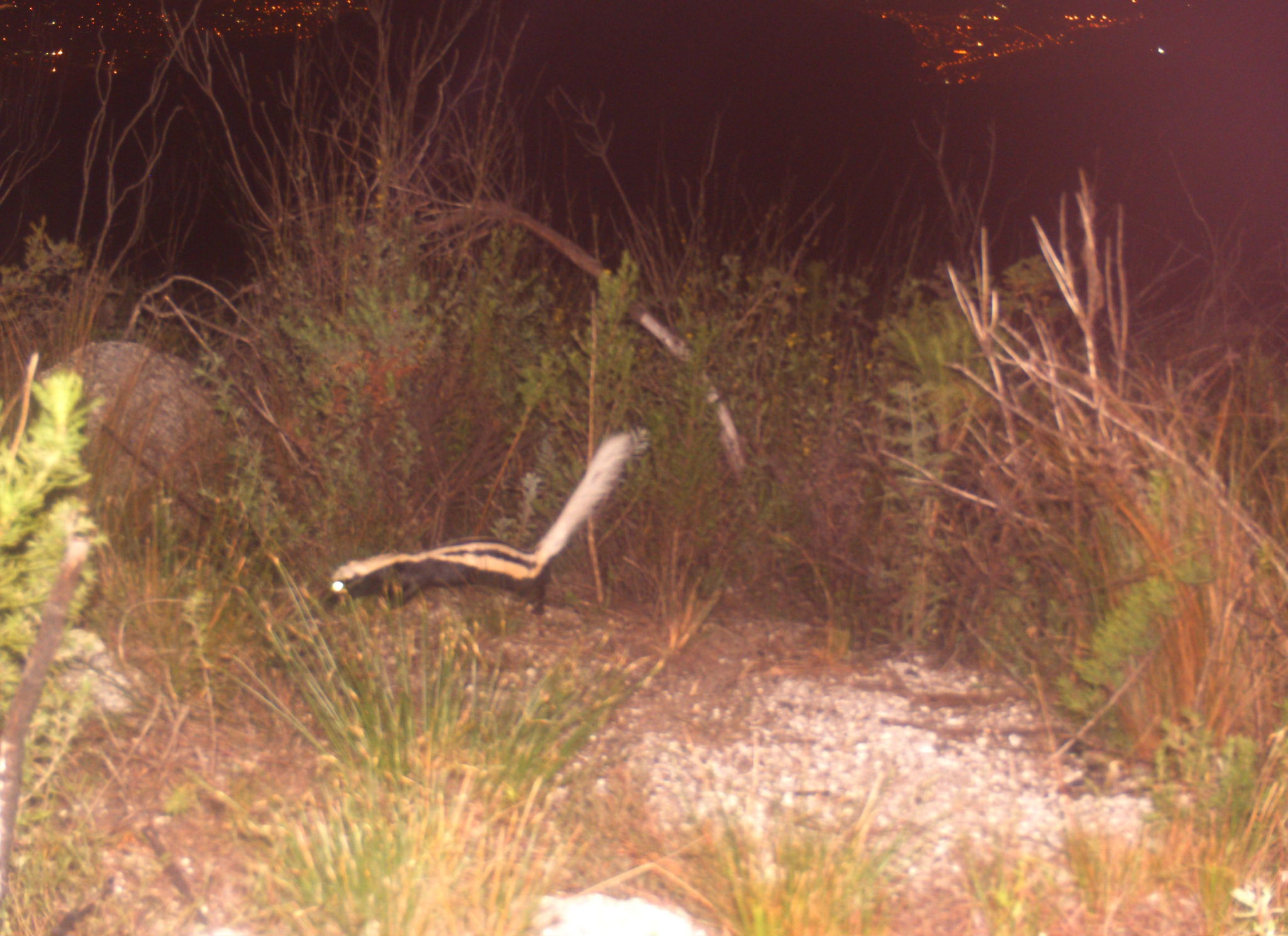
Wild African striped weasel recorded at night in Western Cape, South Africa

The African striped weasel is a mostly nocturnal animal, though it can sometimes be found at dawn or dusk. This species walks with a distinctive gait, with the body stretched out or arched while the snout is held low to the ground, swinging the front part of its body from side to side in a snake-like manner. It regularly stops to stand on its hind legs so that it can survey its surroundings. These weasels are effective diggers and construct their own burrows, sometimes working in pairs to do so, using their front limbs to dig into the ground and their hind limbs to kick soil backwards. However, they may sometimes rest in natural cavities such as hollow logs or rock crevices. They defecate in well-defined latrine locations, raising their tails almost vertically when doing so, possibly as a means of scent marking. In the wild, these latrines are commonly at the bases of trees and termite mounds, whereas captive animals may deposit dung against a vertical wall instead. Captive females with nursing young have been recorded to dip their necks into water during very hot weather, which may be to both cool themselves and carry water so that they can moisten and cool their young.

=== Social behaviour and communication ===
African striped weasels are generally solitary, but may occasionally be seen in pairs or family groups of up to four individuals. Males are aggressive when they encounter one another, at first bristling up the hair on their tails, making short cries and fake charges, and then escalating to fighting with bites, thrashing, and aggressive shrieks if neither individual retreats. The species has been identified as making six different calls. Apart from the warning and aggressive calls, and a third call that transitions between the two, another call signals submission of a retreating male. In addition, there is a call which indicates surrender during a fight, and a greeting call is used only between males and females and between young and their mother. Young weasels also make distress calls when separated from their mother.

=== Feeding ===
African striped weasels are specialist predators known to hunt small mammals and birds, with the vast majority of their diet consisting of rodents of their own size or smaller, and will travel into the burrows of rodents to hunt them. While they occasionally feed on reptiles, insects, and eggs, in experiments conducted during the 1970s, captive striped weasels did not attack or eat several genera of invertebrates (including various insects), reptiles, amphibians and chicken eggs offered to them, even while hungry. The weasels hunt primarily by scent, attacking prey with a sudden lunge and biting onto the back of the neck. After the initial strike, they roll around and kick the prey animal's back or pelvic region, perhaps in order to dislocate the prey's neck (as suggested in 1978 by South African researcher David T. Rowe-Rowe). When taking on larger prey such as rats, which can weigh more than the weasels themselves, adult female weasels bite at the throat instead, though males have not been recorded doing this. Prey is generally eaten whole while the weasel is in a crouched pose, though the feathers and legs of birds and the stomachs of mammals are sometimes left uneaten. Unlike the related striped polecat, this species does not use its front limbs to stabilize its food while eating. Although African striped weasels eat smaller prey weighing up to 180 g (6.3 oz) head first, larger prey is eaten from the shoulder first. They sometimes store prey in their burrow instead of eating it immediately, picking up small prey by the back skin off the ground and dragging larger prey backwards towards the storage area. The gut of an African striped weasel is between 1.75 and 2 times the length of its body excluding the tail, and food passes through rather quickly, with defecation occurring approximately 165 minutes after the food was consumed.

They do not drink frequently, gaining most of their moisture requirements through their food. When they do drink, they do so by lapping up water with their tongues. A male kept in a cage for two weeks during the winter did not drink almost any water during this time, only occasionally drinking small amounts of water during hot weather.

=== Reproduction ===
The breeding season of the African striped weasel is extensive, lasting from spring to the end of summer. The testes of the male remain large from September to April (spring to early autumn) and are shrunken for the rest of the year. A soft chattering sound, believed to be a greeting call, is emitted by the male when courting a female during this time. If the female is receptive, she may express her receptiveness by moving around him. The male will then gently chew on her cheek, sniff her vulva and hold onto her neck from behind. During mating, the male continues to grip the female's neck from behind while clutching his forelimbs around her pelvic region. The duration of copulation is variable and can be as short as 27 minutes, though it typically lasts between 60 and 80 minutes. At least three bouts of copulation can occur within a day. Females raise the young with no aid from the males and give birth to one litter per year of two or three young after a gestation period of about 30 days, though they may have a second litter if the first is lost early.

Birth takes place in a burrow during the daytime, and the mother eats the placenta afterwards. The newborn young weigh just 4 g (0.14 oz) each. They are almost hairless, with their pink skin visible over most of the body, a mane of white hair on the back of the head, and a hump which stretches from the back of the head to the shoulders. Their mother carries them by this hump until it and the mane disappear at seven weeks, at which point she carries them by the scruff of the neck instead. Newborns have closed eyes and ears, making them blind and deaf, despite the eye slits and pinnae (ear flaps) already being present. Their skin becomes dark at seven days old, and the prominent black and white colouration of the species develops at 28 days old. Their milk canine teeth grow out at five weeks, at which point they begin eating the soft parts of prey killed by their mother, with permanent canines growing at 11 weeks before the milk canines are shed. Their eyes open at an age of 51 to 54 days. By 11 weeks of age they are weaned (stop drinking milk), and they start killing their own prey at 13 weeks. They reach full adult size at 20 weeks, and are sexually mature at eight months.

=== Mortality and defense ===
The lifespan of the African striped weasel is short, with captive individuals recorded to only live for five or six years. Tuberculosis of the spleen is a common cause of death in some captive weasels. They are also known to kill each other in intraspecific fights (fights with others of their species). Documented predators of wild individuals include owls and domestic dogs, with humans also sometimes trapping and killing them when they visit chicken houses or to use them in traditional medicine. Some fall victim to vehicular collisions, as evidenced by roadkill carcasses found in agricultural areas. The tapeworm Taenia brachyacantha is also a known parasite of the species.

When startled, African striped weasels attempt to flee by escaping into a hole, or (according to anecdotal evidence) occasionally by climbing up trees. If unable to flee, the animal may emit a sound similar to a growl or shriek while raising its tail and making fake charges at the perceived threat. If this fails, the weasel may spray a yellowish, musky fluid from its perineal glands that can be ejected up to 1 m (3 ft 3 in) away. Though this fluid has a heavy, sweet and pungent smell which has been described as "foul", it apparently is not nauseating and less persistent than the similar secretions of skunks and striped polecats.

== Conservation ==
The International Union for Conservation of Nature (IUCN) first assessed the African striped weasel in 1996 and listed it as a Least Concern species on the IUCN Red List, with the same listing given in subsequent assessments in 2008 and 2015, citing that although it is not commonly seen, it has a wide distribution and habitat tolerance. The IUCN did not make any population estimates for the species, simply stating that the number of mature individuals is unknown, but notes that it is "rare to uncommon". It is not known to face any major threats, even though it is one of the most regularly used species in local traditional medicine. In addition, its skin is used as a good luck charm. Modification of the weasel's preferred grassland habitat due to human activities such as agriculture and livestock grazing may also pose a threat.
