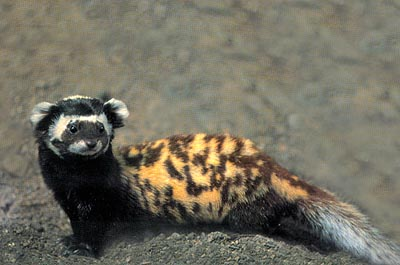
- Adult

Conservation status
- Vulnerable (IUCN 3.1)

Scientific classification
- Kingdom: Animalia
- Phylum: Chordata
- Class: Mammalia
- Order: Carnivora
- Family: Mustelidae
- Genus: Vormela
- Species: V. peregusna

Binomial name
- Vormela peregusna (Güldenstädt, 1770)

Subspecies
- See text
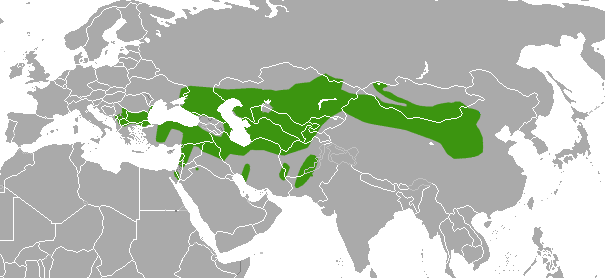
- Marbled polecat range

Synonyms
- List: Mustela peregusna Güldenstädt, 1770; Mustela sarmatica Pallas, 1771; Vormela sarmatica Blasius, 1884; Vormela koshewnikowi Satunin, 1910; Vormela tedshenika Satunin, 1910; Vormela negans Miller, 1910

= Marbled polecat =

Species of carnivore

The marbled polecat (Vormela peregusna) is a small mustelid belonging to the subfamily Ictonychinae. It is the only living member of the genus Vormela. Marbled polecats are generally found in the drier areas and grasslands of southeastern Europe to western China. Like other members of the Ictonychinae, it can emit a strong-smelling secretion from anal sacs under the tail when threatened.

== Taxonomy ==
The oldest scientific description of a marbled polecat was published in 1770, when Baltic German naturalist Johann Anton Güldenstädt reported the species living in the steppes of the lower Don River area in what is now Rostov Oblast, Russia. Believing it to be a member of the genus Mustela, he named this species Mustela peregusna. The specific name comes from perehuznya (перегузня), which is Ukrainian for "polecat". The following year, German zoologist Peter Simon Pallas studied a variant of marbled polecat found along the Volga River in southern Russia and named it Mustela sarmatica, believing it to be a new species. In 1884, German ornithologist August Wilhelm Heinrich Blasius analysed specimens attributed to M. sarmatica and determined that the species belonged in a separate subgenus from other mustelids based on the structure of its skull and teeth. He therefore erected the subgenus Vormela, and renamed the species as Vormela sarmatica. The name Vormela is derived from the German word Würmlein, which means "little worm".

After analysing more specimens of marbled polecats collected across the Russian Empire, Russian zoologist Konstantin Satunin declared in 1910 that because the species named as V. sarmatica differed significantly from other mustelids, it should be placed into a new genus. Satunin therefore elevated Vormela from subgenus to genus level. In addition, he named two new species and attributed them to this genus; Vormela koshewnikowi was established based on a specimen collected from Ashabad, while Vormela tedshenika was named from a specimen found in Tedzhen. Both locations were part of Russian Turkestan at the time. Later that year, American zoologist Gerrit Smith Miller Jr. became the first to refer to the species named Mustela peregusna by Güldenstädt as a member of Vormela, addressing it as Vormela peregusna. In addition, Miller established an additional species of marbled polecat based on skins collected from the Ordos Desert of China by the natives of the area, and gave his new species the name Vormela negans.

In 1936, British zoologist Reginald Innes Pocock determined after studying specimens in the British Museum that only one species of marbled polecat exists. He concluded that all the different morphs which have been named as separate species are actually intergrading local races, and that this species does indeed belong to a separate genus from other living mustelids. Because peregusna is the oldest specific name to have been assigned to a marbled polecat, Vormela peregusna became the valid name of the species, and all the other Vormela species which had been established became junior synonyms of it.

=== Subspecies ===
The marbled polecat is a widespread and highly variable species, leading many authors to erect new subspecies of it based on specimens collected in different areas, some of which were even originally named as separate species. However, there has been debate among experts as to how many subspecies are truly valid. Russian naturalist Sergey Ognev conducted the first taxonomic revision of the marbled polecat in 1935 and believed there to be three subspecies which can be divided into two groups, namely a western group (comprising V. p. peregusna and V. p. alpherakii) and an eastern group (with only V. p. negans). A year later, Pocock published his revision of the species which splits it into six subspecies, reaching such a conclusion after analysing a small number of museum specimens. By the early 21st Century, most authors considered five or six marbled polecat subspecies to be valid, with six listed in an article from Mammalian Species and five being recognised in the third edition of Mammal Species of the World (both published in 2005).

In 2017, a study which analysed 245 marbled polecat skulls collected from across the range of the species was published. The authors concluded that the specimens could be divided into two groups based on physical differences, and therefore determined that only two subspecies are valid, which are listed in the table below:

Subspecies	Trinomial authority	Description	Range	Synonyms
Western marbled polecat (V. p. peregusna) (Nominate subspecies)	(Güldenstädt, 1770)	Smaller than the eastern subspecies, with more contrasting, dark brown fur patterns. Has distinct light bands on the back of the head and neck that do not merge in the front, a small white area around the mouth that does not connect to those around the eyes, and very few yellow spots (0 to 4) on the belly.	Southern and eastern Europe, Anatolia and the Caucasus	sarmatica Pallas, 1771 euxina Pocock, 1936
Eastern marbled polecat (V. p. koshewnikowi)	Satunin, 1910	Larger than the nominate subspecies, with lighter, mainly yellow fur. Has light bands forming a complete "collar" around the neck, large white area around the mouth connecting to those under the eyes, and many large yellow spots on the belly.	Southern and eastern parts of the Middle East, Central Asia and eastward to China	alpherakii Birula, 1910 chinensis Stroganov, 1962 negans Miller, 1910 obscura Stroganov, 1948 ornata Pocock, 1936 pallidior Stroganov, 1948 syriaca Pocock, 1936 tedshenika Satunin, 1910

=== Evolution ===
The marbled polecat belongs to the family Mustelidae, and more specifically to the subfamily Ictonychinae. This subfamily can be divided into two tribes, Ictonychini and Lyncodontini. Along with three African species (the Saharan striped polecat, African striped weasel and striped polecat), the marbled polecat is one of four living species that comprise the former tribe. Genetic analysis has revealed that the lineage of the marbled polecat diverged from the rest of Ictonychini early on in the evolution of this tribe, with multiple studies recovering this species as a sister group to the clade comprising the African members of Ictonychini. A 2008 study suggested that this divergence occurred between 4.6 and 4.0 million years ago, whereas a 2012 study proposed an earlier date between 6.48 and 6.01 million years ago. The following cladogram shows the position of the marbled polecat among its closest living relatives according to Gray et al. (2022):

- Ictonychinae
  - Galictis vittata (Greater grison)
  - - Vormela peregusna (Marbled polecat)
    - - Ictonyx libycus (Saharan striped polecat)
      - - Ictonyx striatus (Striped polecat)
        - Poecilogale albinucha (African striped weasel)

The marbled polecat is the type species of the genus Vormela, and the only extant member of the genus. However, two extinct species known from fossils, namely Vormela petenyii and Vormela prisca, have also been assigned to this genus. In particular, Vormela petenyii specimens have been collected from the Late Pliocene to Early Pleistocene-aged deposits of Hungary, Poland and Bulgaria, and this species has been suggested to be the direct ancestor of the modern marbled polecat.

Analysis of skull measurements has revealed that the anatomical diversity of marbled polecats is highest in western parts of this animal's range and decreases eastward. In addition, studies of mitochondrial DNA have revealed that genetic diversity in this species is low throughout most of its range. However, populations from Anatolia and Bulgaria (in the westernmost areas of the marbled polecat's range) exhibit higher genetic diversity, with ancestral lineages having been discovered in Bulgaria. This suggests that the species originated in the Balkan-Caucasian region, and Bulgaria was likely a refugium for it during the last ice age (between 115,000 and 11,700 years ago), after which it spread out eastwards to colonize other parts of its modern range very quickly.

== Description ==
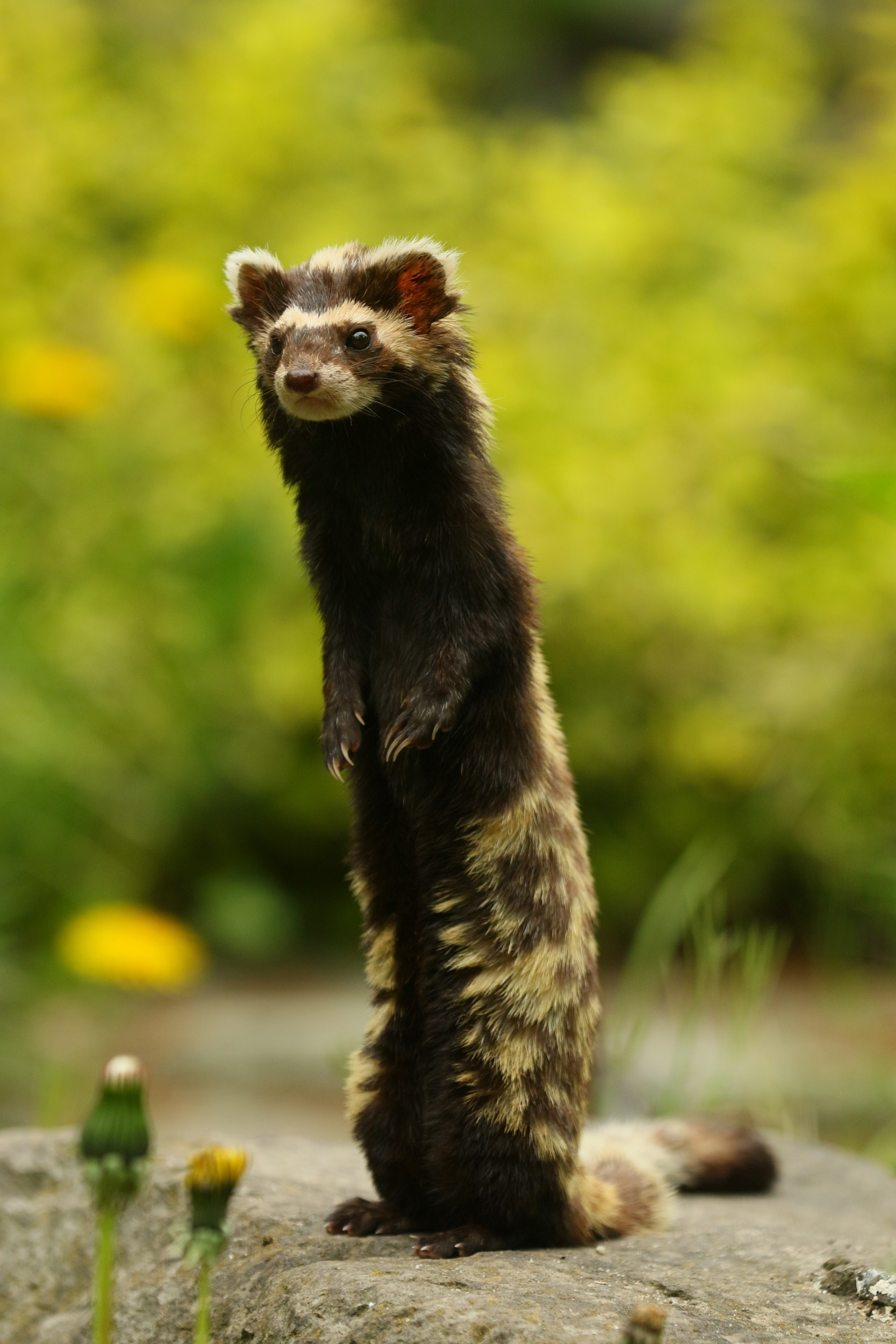
Marbled polecat in the Magdeburg Zoo

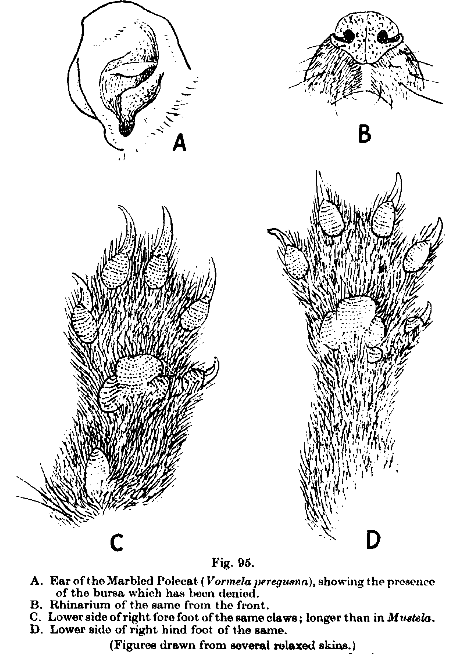
Paws, nose and ear, as illustrated in Pocock's The Fauna of British India, including Ceylon and Burma - Mammalia Vol 2

Ranging in length from 29–35 cm (head and body), the marbled polecat has a short muzzle and very large, noticeable ears. The limbs are short and claws are long and strong. While the tail is long, with long hair, the overall pelage is short. Black and white mark the face, with a black stripe across the eyes and white markings around the mouth. Dorsally, the pelage is yellow and heavily mottled with irregular reddish or brown spots. The tail is dark brown with a yellowish band in the midregion. The ventral region and limbs are a dark brown. Females weigh from 295 to 600 g (10.4 to 21.2 oz) and males from 320 to 715 g (11.3 to 25.2 oz).

== Distribution and habitat ==
The marbled polecat is distributed from Southeast Europe including the Balkans to the Caucasus, the Levant and Central Asia into north-western Pakistan, southern Mongolia and northern China. In 1998, a marbled polecat was recorded on the Sinai Peninsula, Egypt. It inhabits open desert, semidesert, and semiarid rocky areas in upland valleys and low hill ranges, steppe country, and arid subtropical scrub forest. It avoids montane regions. Marbled polecats have been sighted in cultivated areas such as melon patches and vegetable fields.

== Behaviour and ecology ==
The marbled polecat is most active during the morning and evening. Its eyesight is weak, and it relies on its well-developed sense of smell. Vocalization is limited and consists of shrill alarm cries, grunts and a submissive long shriek. It is solitary and moves extensively through a home range of 0.5–0.6 km^{2} (0.19–0.23 sq mi). It generally stays in a shelter once. When encountering each other, they are usually aggressive.

When alarmed, a marbled polecat raises up on its legs while arching its back and curling its tail over its back, with the long tail hair erect. It may also raise its head, bare its teeth, and give shrill, short hisses. If threatened, it can expel a foul-smelling secretion from enlarged anal glands under its tail.

To excavate burrows, the marbled polecat digs out earth with its forelegs while anchoring itself with its chin and hind legs. It uses its teeth to pull out obstacles such as roots.

Burrows of large ground squirrels or similar rodents such as the great gerbil (Rhombomys opimus) and Libyan jird (Meriones libycus) are used by marbled polecats for resting and breeding. They may also dig their own dens or live in underground irrigation tunnels. In the winter, marbled polecats line their dens with grass.

=== Reproduction ===
Marbled polecats mate from March to early June. Their mating calls are most often heard as low, rumbling sounds in a slow rhythm. Gestation can be long and variable (243 to 327 days). Parturition has been observed to occur from late January to mid-March. Delayed implantation allows marbled polecats to time the birth of their cubs for favorable conditions, such as when prey is abundant.

Litter sizes range from four to eight cubs. Only females care for the young. Cubs open their eyes around 38–40 days old, are weaned at 50–54 days, and leave their mother (disperse) at 61–68 days old.

=== Diet ===
Marbled polecats are known to eat ground squirrels, Libyan jirds (Meriones libycus), Armenian hamsters (Cricetulus migratorius), voles, Palestine mole-rats (Spalax lecocon ehrenbergi), house mice (Mus musculus), and other rodents, small hares, birds, lizards, fish, frogs, snails, and insects (beetles and crickets), as well as fruit and grass. They are also recorded as taking small domestic poultry such as chickens and pigeons, as well as stealing smoked meat and cheese.

== Conservation status ==
In 2008, the marbled polecat was classified as a vulnerable species in the IUCN Red List due to a population reduction of at least 30% in the previous 10 years. In 1996, it had been considered a species of least concern. The decline in marbled polecat populations thought to be due to habitat loss and reduction in available prey due to use of rodenticides.

Data revealed that from the west to the east, a gradual decrease in morphological diversity was seen in polecat skulls, thus giving location as a factor to diversify the polecats. Also, the data related to the range formation of the species rather than climate change.

== Threats ==
The marbled polecat was once sought for its fur, generally known as "fitch" or more specifically, "perwitsky" in the fur trade.
