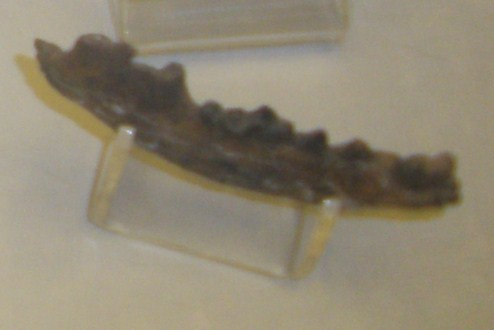
- Fossil of Pannonictis nestii

Scientific classification
- Kingdom: Animalia
- Phylum: Chordata
- Class: Mammalia
- Order: Carnivora
- Family: Mustelidae
- Subfamily: Ictonychinae
- Genus: †Pannonictis; Kormos, 1931

Type species
- †Pannonictis pliocaenica Kormos, 1931

Other Species
- P. nestii; P. pachygnatha; P. baroniensis

= Pannonictis =

Pannonictis Temporal range: Late Pliocene - Mid Pleistocene 2.6–1.0 Ma

Extinct genus of mustelid

Pannonictis is a genus of extinct mustelids. It is first known from the very Late Pliocene, and it survived until the end of the Villafranchian. The genus is most commonly recorded from deposits between 2.6 and 1.4 Ma. Fossil remains of Pannonictis have been found throughout Eurasia, from the Iberian Peninsula to eastern China.

== Taxonomy ==
Pannonictis is closely related to another prehistoric genus, Enhydrictis. At least four different species are recognised; P. pliocaenica, P. pachygnatha, P. nestii, and P. baroniensis. Another species known as P. pilgrimi is no longer valid, and most likely a synonym of P. pliocaenica. In the past, Martellictis ardea was also at one point considered a species of Pannonictis, but it has since been moved to its own genus.

== Description ==
As with many living mustelids, Pannonictis likely displayed pronounced sexual dimorphism. In fact, the small species known as P. pilgrimi is now often considered merely a female form of the larger P. pliocaenica. P. nestii was the smallest and most slender species of the genus as well as the latest surviving member. P. pachygnatha is a more robust species, with specific dental and mandibular differences.

An otter-like aquatic lifestyle for Pannonictis is not likely, but it has been suggested it inhabited areas near river courses, much like their phylogenetic descendant, the living grison.
