= Bolt's Farm =

Paleontological site in South Africa

- Location in Gauteng
- 26.033235°S 27.712057°E
- Periods: Early Pliocene, Plio-Pleistocene, Late Pleistocene, Holocene
- Location: Gauteng Province, South Africa
- Part of: Cradle of Humankind

Site notes
- Area: 1.3 km^{2} (0.50 sq mi)

Bolt's Farm is a palaeontological site in the Cradle of Humankind World Heritage Site, Gauteng province, South Africa. With more than 30 fossil deposits dating back 4.5 Ma, it is one of the oldest sites currently discovered in the Cradle of Humankind. It consists of multiple cavities, pits, and quarries, where caves have eroded away, exposing their fossiliferous interiors. Although this site has not yet yielded the hominid fossils for which the Cradle of Humankind is known, Bolt's Farm is still an important source of fossils from various species of Early Pliocene and Plio-Pleistocene fauna, including primates and big cats.

== Geography ==
Bolt's Farm is located about 3 km (1.9 mi) southwest of the Sterkfontein archaeological site and is located in the southwestern corner of the Cradle of Humankind World Heritage Site. The site is carved out of the Malmani Subgroup of the Transvaal Supergroup, which formed during the Palaeoproterozoic era around 2.6–2.4 billion years ago under what was then an inland sea.

The pockmarked appearance of the area is the result of heavy ancient cave erosion down to the floors and walls of the passages, resulting in dozens of dolomite solution cavities and palaeokarst pits that have preserved fossils in breccia, speleothem, sandstone, and siltstone. These deposits occur over a 1.3 km^{2} (0.50 sq mi) stretch of hillside. It is unknown if these caves were once interconnected and contemporary with one another, or if they existed separately. The oldest of these deposits yet known is Waypoint 160, which was discovered in 1996 and has been dated back to the Early Pliocene, approximately 4.5–4 Ma. Almost all other sites have been dated back only to the Plio-Pleistocene; dates vary from one pit to the next, although most fall in the range of 2–1 Ma. One site, New Cave, may hold fossils that are significantly more recent; remains there have been dated to the Late Pleistocene into the Holocene.

Palaeontological studies of the fossils recovered at the site seem to suggest that, at the time the site was active, the region was drier and the area was more open than it is today. Nevertheless, the site is believed to have been in relative proximity to a water source. The species recovered from Bolt's Farm and the greater Sterkfontein Valley area may have inhabited a range of local habitat types, ranging from covered forest to open grasslands. Browser and grazer species, as well as ground and tree-dwelling primates, are represented in the fossil record. At least one location on the site dated to 2–1.5 Ma, Pit 23, has been theorised to have been a "death trap" where ancient fauna inadvertently fell to their deaths and their remains were preserved over time.

== Discovery and history of excavations ==
The area on the northern edge of a farm owned by Billy Bolt, for whom the site is named, was first used as a speleothem quarry during the late 19th and early 20th centuries. Miners harvested this speleothem for use in lime production. This process unearthed fossil deposits, which were first sampled and examined by palaeontologist Robert Broom during a 1936 expedition to Transvaal. Broom named many of the fossil taxa recovered from the site. In 1947 and 1948, a team of researchers from the University of California Museum of Paleontology (UCMP) led by palaeontologists Frank Peabody and Charles Lewis Camp, called the University of California Africa Expedition, began exploring palaeontological sites across eastern and southern Africa. A team of the southern branch of the expedition led by Peabody was responsible for the first excavation at Bolt's Farm. The mining had created rubble chunks containing fossiliferous breccia; early investigations retrieved material from this rubble, instead of mining it in situ. Additionally, the UCMP excavations were centred on the main quarry. Multiple smaller excavations have been completed in the decades since. Historically, Bolt's Farm has been ignored for sites where hominid fossils have already been discovered, which are of much more interest to archaeologists; thus, the study of the site has lagged behind that of its neighbors like Sterkfontein.

Until the 1990s, the precise locations of multiple fossiliferous pits within the larger site were poorly recorded and thus unable to be located by subsequent archaeologists. Renewed surveying began in the 1990s has attempted to rediscover the deposits first described in—but barely explored since—the 1940s. In the process, these surveys have unsurprisingly uncovered new sites. In 1991, Basil Cooke published the first updated map of the site since the 1940s excavations; however, attempts to line up Peabody's original map and site descriptions with sites identified in more recent surveys remain a source of confusion for researchers. However, Cooke's survey marked the beginning of a period of renewed interest in Bolt's Farm. A survey done by French researchers from 1996 to 1999 revealed new fossil species and sites, including Waypoint 160, which is thought to be the oldest known site in the Cradle of Humankind. A survey done by the Cradle of Humankind's Human Origins and Past Environments Research Unit (HRU) team between 2008 and 2011 identified 23 old sites and eight new ones. Further surveys carried out in the late 2010s have used GIS and aerial drone surveying to more accurately identify these sites.

Some of the specimens collected during the 1940s excavations have been lost; however, many of those surviving are stored at the University of California Museum of Paleontology at the University of California, Berkeley. Beginning in the late 1950s, loans and repatriation efforts have handed over many of the fossils to the Evolutionary Studies Institute at the University of the Witwatersrand in Johannesburg. The Ditsong National Museum of Natural History in Pretoria is also in possession of Bolt's Farm specimens, where many are kept on semi-permanent display to the public.

== Palaeontology ==
Fossils recovered from the Bolt's Farm pits represent a wide array of macrofauna. Animals active in the Bolt's Farm area during the Plio-Pleistocene included big cats, non-hominid primates, snakes, horses, mustelids, bovids, pigs, antelope, rodents, jackals, reptiles, and birds of prey. Signs of various microfauna have also been uncovered but not studied in-depth.

The deposits have also yielded some of the oldest primate fossils in the Cradle of Humankind; they belong to Parapapio (specifically, Pp. broomi and Pp. whitei), extinct species of baboons that have also been located at Sterkfontein, Taung, and Makapansgat. The Pp. whitei specimens from Bolt's Farm are the most complete remains of this species that have been discovered. Other primate remains include Theropithecus, Papio robinsoni and Cercopithecoides williamsi. Because hominid fossils contemporary to the depositional period have been recovered in similar conditions in east African archaeological sites, several researchers have put forth the suggestion that hominid fossils could be found at Bolt's Farm as well.

Other species represented in the Bolt's Farm fossil deposits are Antidorcas recki, Ictonyx bolti, Metridiochoerus andrewsi, Euryotomys bolti, Elephantulus antiquus, Boltimys broomi, and Proteles cristatus. Bolt's Farm has yielded some of the best specimens of Plio-Pleistocene big cats in South Africa, including a complete skull and jaw of the saber-toothed cat Dinofelis barlowi. The first fossil remains of a snake belonging to the family Elapidae recovered from southern Africa were collected from Bolt's Farm in 2009. The 2016 discovery at Bolt's Farm of the first fossil Agama lizard recovered from the Cradle of Humankind was announced in 2020.
