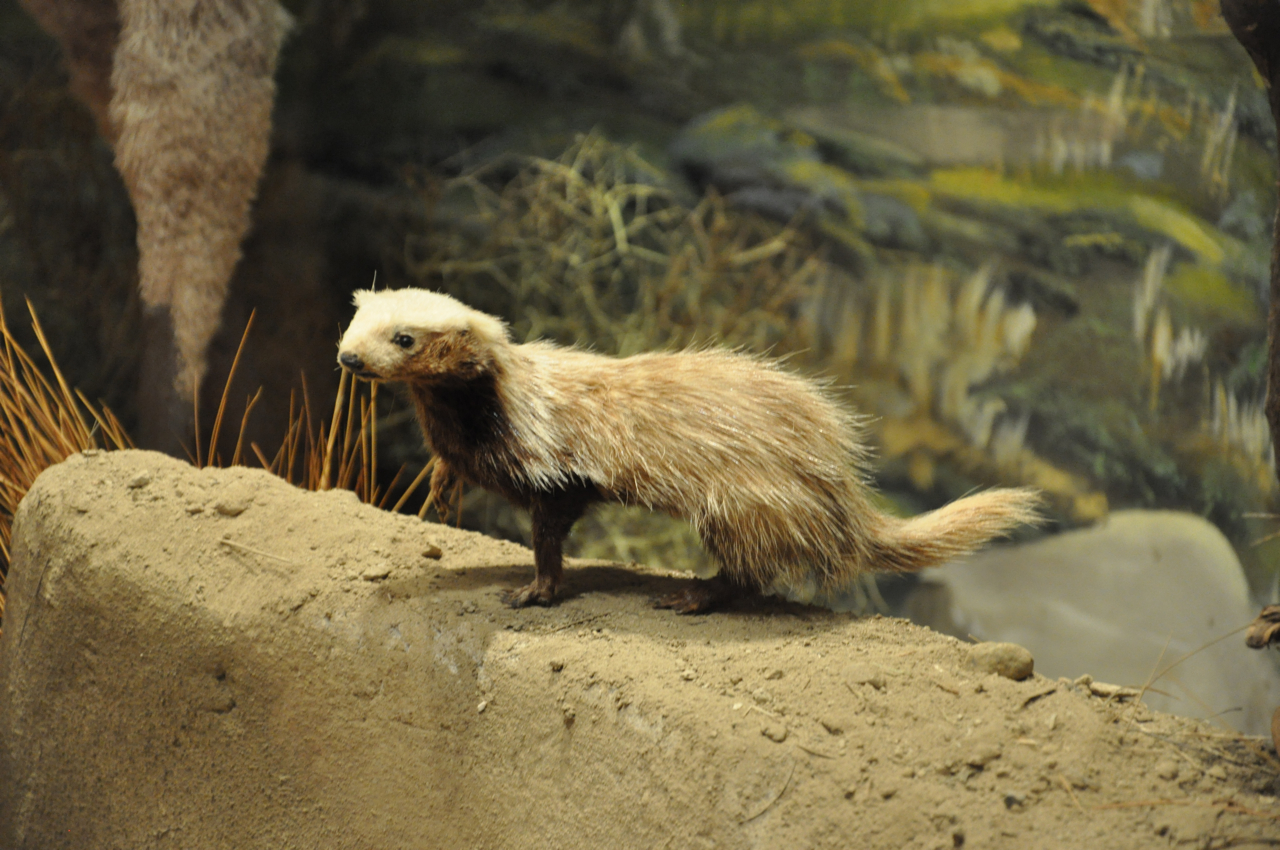
- Mounted specimen at Museum of Patagonia

Conservation status
- Least Concern (IUCN 3.1)

Scientific classification
- Kingdom: Animalia
- Phylum: Chordata
- Class: Mammalia
- Order: Carnivora
- Family: Mustelidae
- Subfamily: Ictonychinae
- Genus: Lyncodon; Gervais, 1845
- Species: L. patagonicus

Binomial name
- Lyncodon patagonicus (Blainville, 1842)

Subspecies
- L. p. patagonicus Blainville, 1842; L. p. thomasi Cabrera, 1928
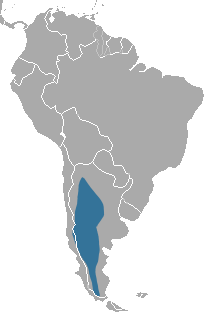
- Patagonian weasel range

Synonyms
- Mustela patagonica Blainville, 1842

= Patagonian weasel =

Species of carnivore

The Patagonian weasel (Lyncodon patagonicus) is a small mustelid that is the only member of the genus Lyncodon. Its geographic range is the Pampas of western Argentina and sections of Chile. An early mention of the animal is in the Journal of Syms Covington, who sailed with Charles Darwin on his epic voyage aboard HMS Beagle.

== Description ==
The Patagonian weasel has a head and body length of 300–350 mm (12–14 inches), with a tail that is 60–90 mm (2.4–3.5 inches). Its fur is primarily whitish, interspersed with black and dark brown tones. It has small ears, short legs and a bushy tail. The species has not been extensively studied in the wild, so its behavioral patterns remains largely unknown. It is reported to have been kept as a working pet by local ranchers to destroy rodents.
