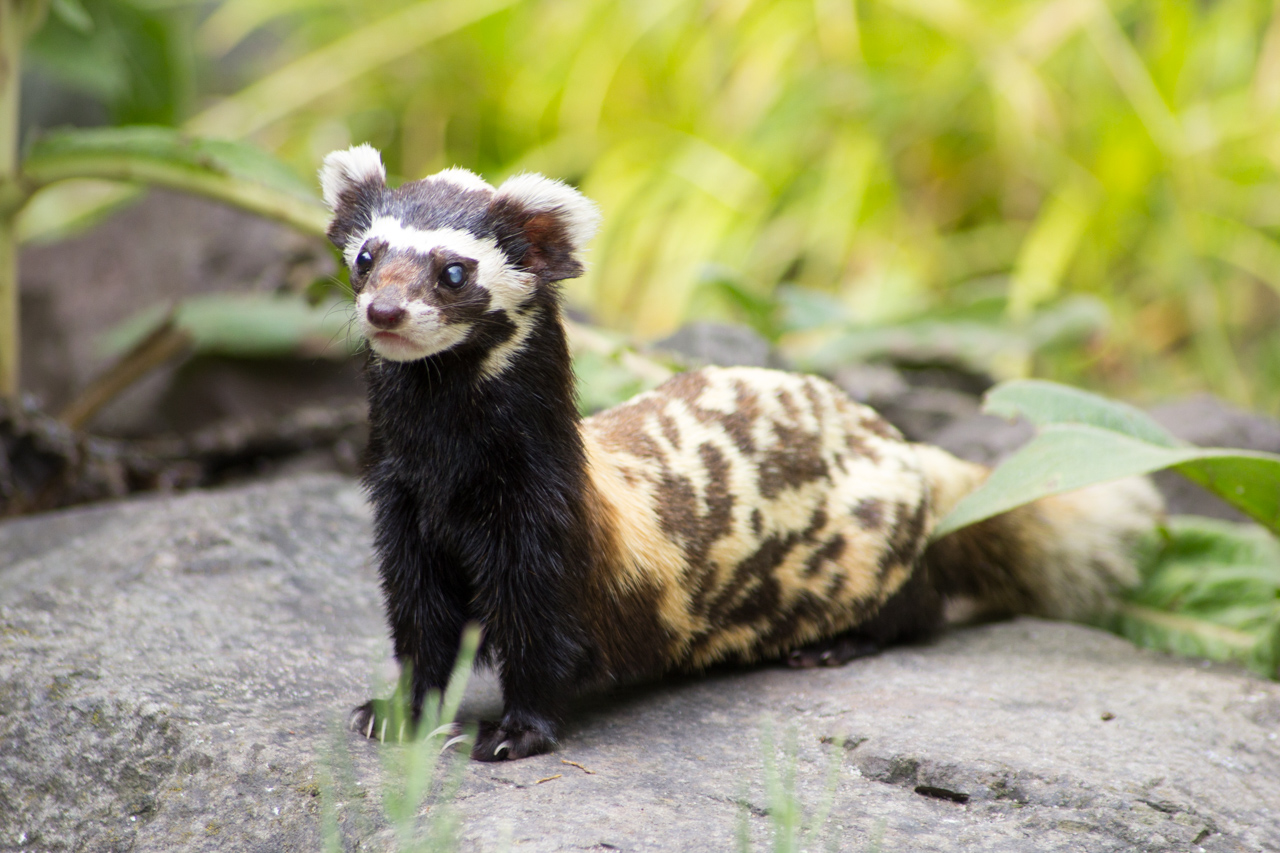
- Marbled polecat (Vormela peregusna)

Scientific classification
- Kingdom: Animalia
- Phylum: Chordata
- Class: Mammalia
- Order: Carnivora
- Family: Mustelidae
- Subfamily: Ictonychinae
- Genus: Vormela; Blasius, 1884

Species
- Vormela peregusna; †Vormela petenyii; †Vormela prisca?

= Vormela =

Vormela Temporal range: Pliocene - Recent

Genus of mammal

Vormela is a genus of mustelid which contains the marbled polecat (Vormela peregusna), and at least one extinct species.

The oldest record of the genus dates to the Villafranchian of Bulgaria, where fossils of Vormela petenyii have been found. This species is considered the ancestor of the marbled polecat. It is also considered synonymous with the species Pliovormela beremendensis. Another possible species known as Vormela prisca has been identified in China.
