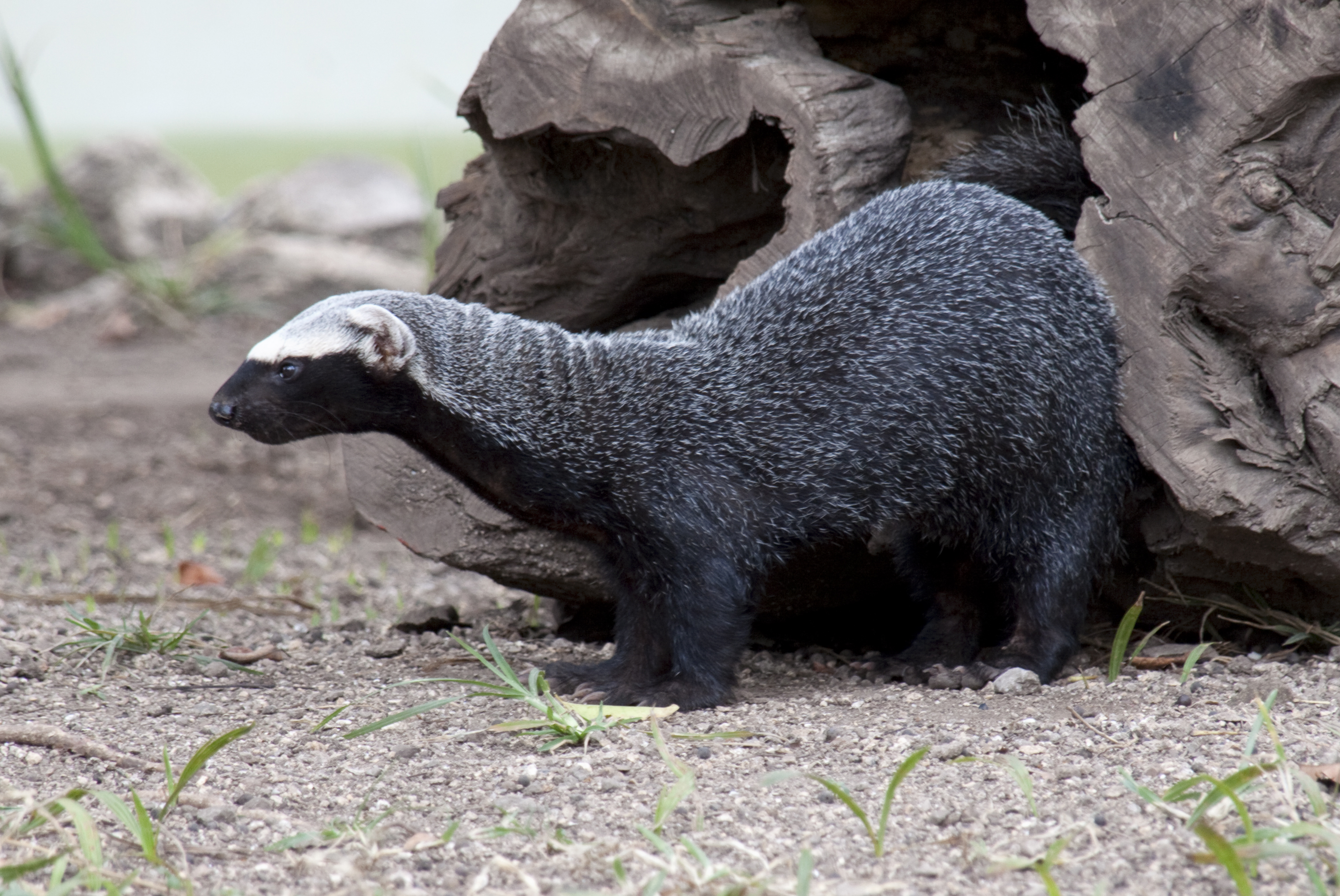
- Greater grison (Galictis vittata)

Scientific classification
- Kingdom: Animalia
- Phylum: Chordata
- Class: Mammalia
- Order: Carnivora
- Family: Mustelidae
- Subfamily: Ictonychinae; Pocock, 1921

Genera
- Galictis; Ictonyx; Lyncodon; Poecilictis; Poecilogale; Vormela

Synonyms
- Galictinae Reig, 1956; Grisoninae Pocock, 1921; Zorillinae Gill, 1872

= Ictonychinae =

Subfamily of carnivores

Ictonychinae is a subfamily of the mammal family Mustelidae found mainly in the Neotropics (three species) and Africa (three species), with one Eurasian member. It includes the grisons, Patagonian weasel, striped polecats, African striped weasel, and marbled polecat. These genera were formerly included within a paraphyletic definition of the mustelid subfamily Mustelinae.

Most members have a mask-like bar or larger dark marking across their faces; the African representatives of the group are striped. A defense mechanism common to the group is use of a chemical spray similar to (but not necessarily as strong as) that of skunks.

Ictonychinae arose approximately 9 - 9.5 million years ago.

== Species ==
Subfamily Ictonychinae

Tribe	Image	Genus	Living species
Ictonychini		Ictonyx Kaup, 1835	Striped polecat, I. striatus
Ictonychini		Poecilogale Thomas, 1883	African striped weasel, P. albinucha
Ictonychini		Poecilictis Thomas & Hinton, 1920	Saharan striped polecat, P. libyca
Ictonychini		Vormela Blasius, 1884	Marbled polecat, V. peregusna
Lyncodontini		Lyncodon Gervais, 1845	Patagonian weasel, L. patagonicus
Lyncodontini		Galictis Bell, 1826	Greater grison, G. vittata; Lesser grison, G. cuja

=== Fossil genera ===
- Baranogale
- Cernictis
- Eirictis
- Enhydrictis
- Martellictis
- Lutravus
- Oriensictis
- Pannonictis
- Propoecilogale
- Sminthosinis
- Stipanicicia
- Trigonictis
- Trochictis
