= Frank Peabody =

American paleontologist (1914–1958)

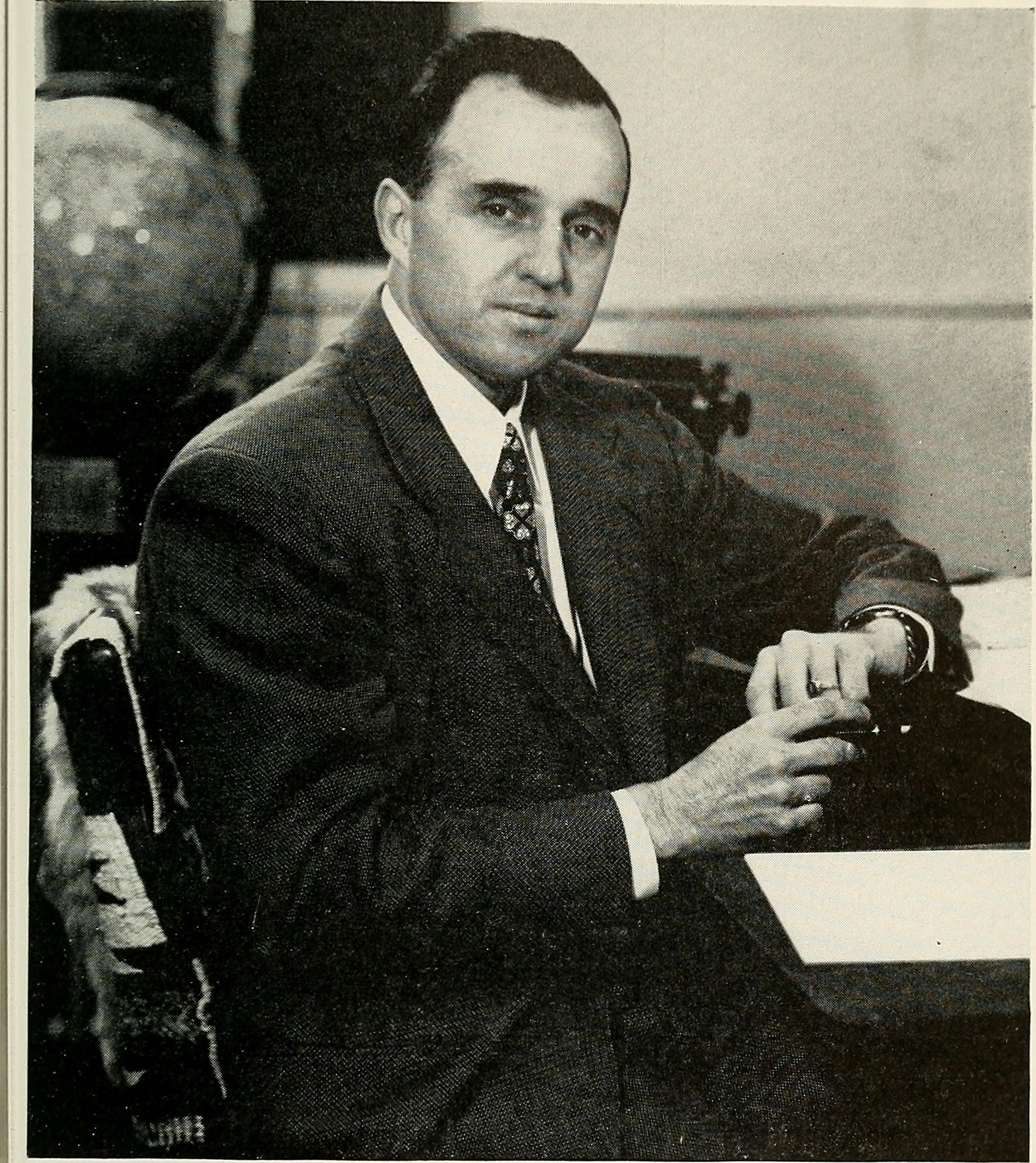
Peabody in 1956

Frank Elmer Peabody (28 August 1914 - 27 June 1958), was an American palaeontologist noted for his research on fossil trackways and reptile and amphibian skeletal structure.

He attended high school and junior college in the San Francisco Bay Area. His undergraduate studies were completed at the University of California in 1938 and in 1940 he was awarded an M.A. in paleontology. While working at the University of California, Berkeley he came under the tutelage of Professor Charles Lewis Camp from whom he inherited a passion for vertebrate phylogenetic problems. Peabody and fellow student Sam P. Welles helped Camp with his research on the North American Triassic with their work at the Moenkopi Formation, the Dinosaur National Monument sandstones, and the Kayenta Formation.

During World War II Peabody worked at the Lawrence Berkeley National Laboratory and Oak Ridge National Laboratory, and finished his doctorate at the University of California in 1946. He accompanied the University of California South African Expedition in 1947-1948 as Senior Paleontologist. He and Charles Camp excavated at Gladysvale Cave and nearby Bolt's Farm. Subsequently, they visited the Northern Transvaal and Mozambique in their search for specimens. The expedition also visited Wonderwerk Cave in Northern Cape Province.

Charles Camp, Joseph T. Gregory, and Frank Peabody were interested in the histology of fossil bones, and prepared numerous sections to compare their structures with those of modern mammals. This slide collection continues to be useful.

Peabody later became Instructor in Zoology at the University of Kansas at Lawrence. The fossils he excavated near Garnett, Kansas, were source material for his work on the earliest known reptiles. Until his untimely death of a heart attack in 1958, his interests included the evolution, osteology, and ecology of the Garnett fossil reptiles. Shortly before his death he was awarded a National Science Foundation research grant.

Peabody was married to wife Anna for 20 years and they had three children.

== Publications ==
- Trackways Of Living And Fossil Salamanders. (1959). University of California Press.
- Peabody, F. E. (1961). Annual growth zones in living and fossil vertebrates. Journal of Morphology 108(1) 11–62.
