= H. Basil S. Cooke =

South African-Canadian geologist and palaeontologist

- Born: October 17, 1915; Johannesburg, South Africa
- Died: May 3, 2018 (aged 102)
- Citizenship: Canadian
- Education: King Edward VII School; Cambridge University; University of the Witwatersrand
- Scientific career
- Fields: Geology, Palaeontology
- Workplaces: Dalhousie University
- Website: www.dal.ca/faculty/science/earth-sciences/faculty_staff/faculty/cooke_hbs.html

Herbert Basil Sutton Cooke FRSSAf (17 October 1915 – 3 May 2018) was a South African-Canadian geologist and palaeontologist, and Emeritus Professor at Dalhousie University. Born in Johannesburg, South Africa, he was educated at King Edward VII School before earning a B.A. (1936) and M.A. (1940) at Cambridge University, and M.Sc. (1940) and D.Sc. (1947) at the University of the Witwatersrand.

He is known for his studies of fossil pigs and other even-toed ungulates of Africa. A festschrift in honor of his life and contributions was published in Transactions of the Royal Society of South Africa in 2006.

== Honors and awards ==
He was made a Fellow of the Royal Society of South Africa in 1948 for his contributions to Quaternary geology.

He received the Canadian Centennial Medal (1967) and Queen’s Golden Jubilee Medal (2002) for his contributions to education. Other honors include being a Life Fellow of the Geological Society of South Africa, an Honorary Life Member of the Palaeontological Society of Southern Africa, past president and Life Member of both the South African Geographical Society and the South African Archaeological Society, and past vice-president of the South African Association for the Advancement of Science.

== Books ==
His books include Geology for South African Students, co-written with G. N. G. Hamilton and published in five editions since 1939, and The Evolution of African Mammals (1978), co-edited with V. J. Maglio.

== Death ==
He turned 100 in October 2015, and died in May 2018 at the age of 102.
