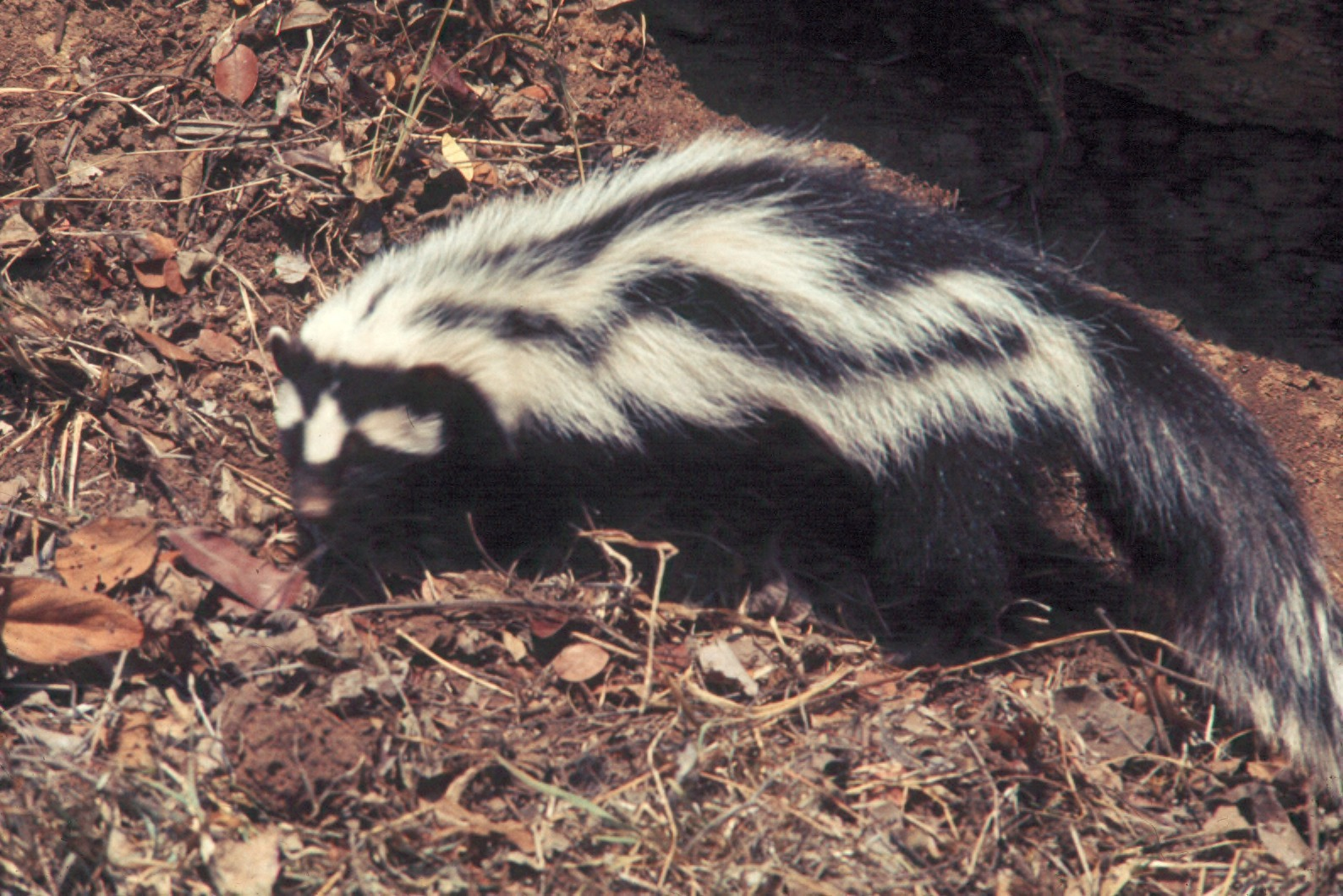
- Striped polecat (Ictonyx striatus)

Scientific classification
- Kingdom: Animalia
- Phylum: Chordata
- Class: Mammalia
- Order: Carnivora
- Family: Mustelidae
- Subfamily: Ictonychinae
- Genus: Ictonyx; Kaup, 1835

Type species
- Ictonyx capensis Kaup 1835 (= Bradypus striatus Perry, 1810)

Species
- †Ictonyx harrisoni; Ictonyx striatus
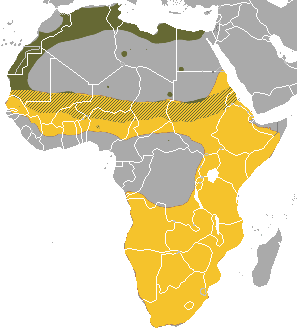
- Ictonyx range

= Ictonyx =

Ictonyx Temporal range: Early Pliocene - recent, 3.85–0 Ma

Genus of carnivores

Ictonyx is a genus in the family Mustelidae (weasels). It contains only one extant species:

- Striped polecat (Ictonyx striatus)

In addition, an extinct species named Ictonyx harrisoni is known from fossils.
