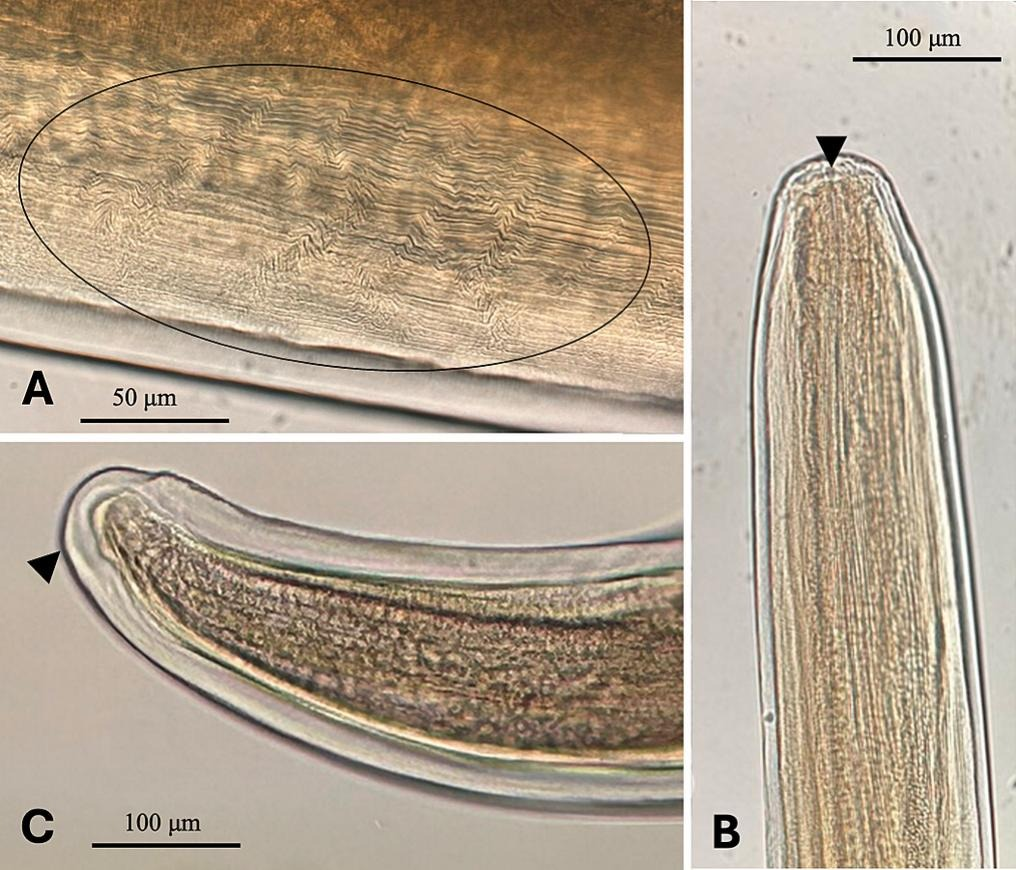
- Cuticle (A), cephalic end (B) and posterior end (C) of a Filaria martis as seen under a microscope

Scientific classification
- Kingdom: Animalia
- Phylum: Nematoda
- Class: Chromadorea
- Order: Rhabditida
- Family: Filariidae
- Genus: Filaria
- Species: F. martis

Binomial name
- Filaria martis Gmelin, 1790

Synonyms
- List: F. mustelarum Rudolphi, 1809; F. quadrispina Diesing, 1851; F. perforans Molins, 1858

= Filaria martis =

Species of roundworm

Filaria martis is a parasitic species of roundworm belonging to the genus Filaria, of which it is the type species. It is known to parasitize the subcutaneous tissues of mustelids (though the African leopard is also a recorded host), causing the disease filariasis.

== Taxonomy ==
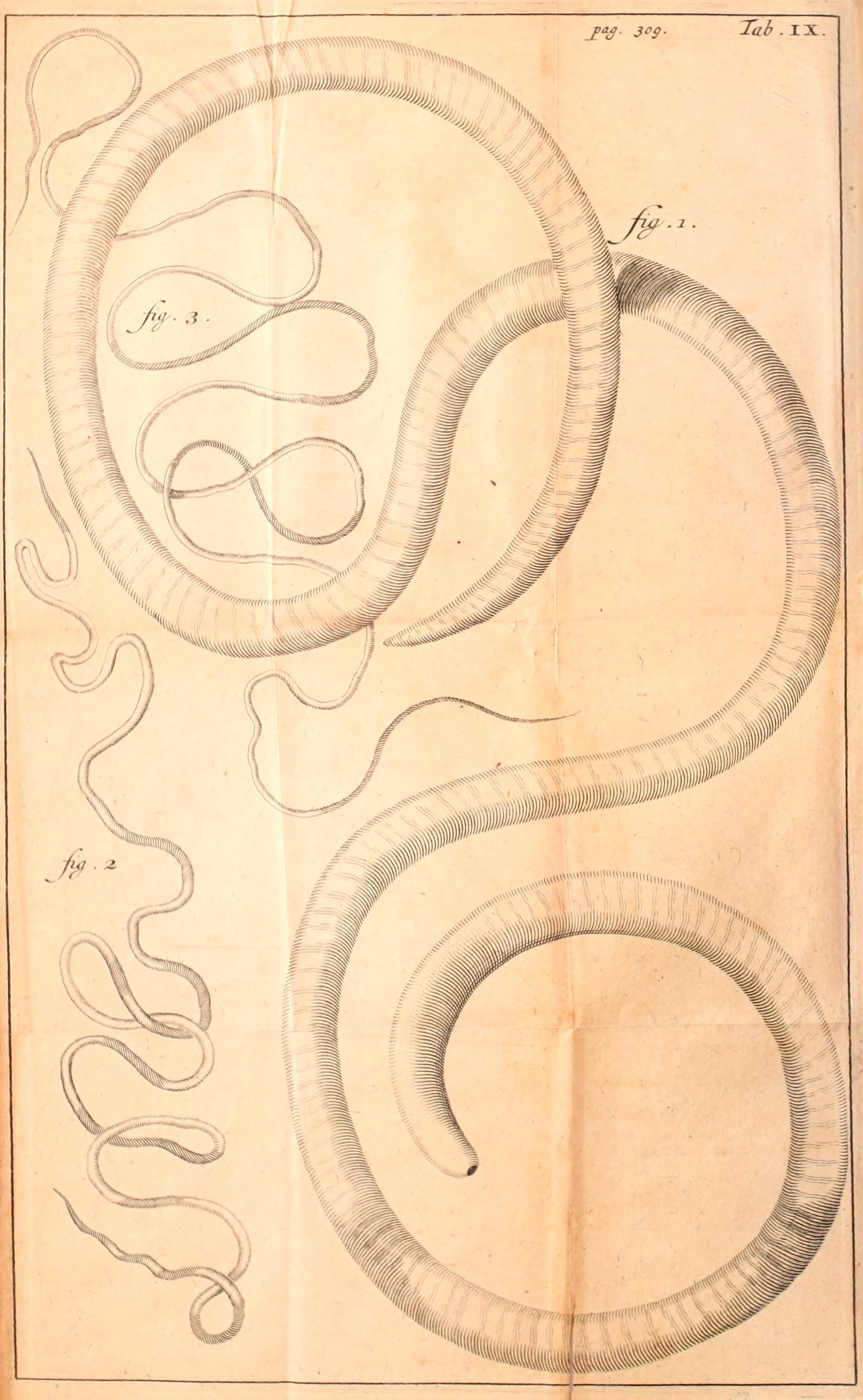
Illustrations made by Francesco Redi in 1708 of three parasitic worms. The worm labeled as 'figure 1' was formerly incorrectly referred to as Filaria martis, which is actually represented by the one labeled 'figure 3'

The species Filaria martis was first scientifically described by German naturalist Johann Friedrich Gmelin in 1790 based on specimens collected from inside a European pine marten, and has been mentioned in a 1787 publication by Otto Friedrich Müller in which the genus Filaria is erected. Both Gmelin and Müller refer to figure 1 of plate 9 in a 1708 publication by Francesco Redi when describing this species. However, this figure actually depicts a different species known as Ascaris renalis, and the two authors likely made a writing mistake, intending to refer to figure 3 of the same plate.

Over a century after it was first described, Filaria martis was fixed as the type species of the genus Filaria by American parasitologist Charles Wardell Stiles in 1907. The taxonomy of this genus and species have been the subjects of dispute among experts. Multiple other species would be established and attributed to this genus in following years, but in 1960 Canadian parasitologist Roy C. Anderson determined that this species and F. cephalophi were the only two which were certainly valid, and that four other species which had been established by that time (F. hyracis, F. carvalhoi, F. texensis and F. conepati) were probably junior synonyms of F. martis. On the contrary, a 1989 study supported the validity ten species including of F. hyracis, F. carvalhoi (with F. conepati being deemed a junior synonym of it) and F. texensis, with the new species F. versterae being erected based on a specimen which Anderson considered to be F. martis. The species F. conepati would later be revalidated in a paper published in 2022, which recognizes 13 valid species of Filaria.

== Description ==
Whitish to yellowish in colour, the body of Filaria martis is long and slender, narrowing slightly at the front and back ends. The cephalic end (head) has four pairs of slightly cone-shaped papillae, a pair of thin amphids (sensory organs) and a round mouth opening with a chitinous ring at its base. The cuticle is made of fibres running diagonally to the longitudinal axis (head to tail) of the body, creating streaked markings. The esophagus is split into a long glandular portion and a short muscular portion, though the junction between the two is not always clear.

This species is sexually dimorphic, with members of each sex showing significant differences from those of the other. Females are larger, with bodies measuring 152–193 mm (6.0–7.6 in) long and 0.29–0.38 mm (0.011–0.015 in) wide, whereas males grow only 76–93 mm (3.0–3.7 in) long and 0.23–0.33 mm (0.0091–0.0130 in) wide. A vulva is visible in females, located beside the mouth opening. In addition, the tail end of the female is smooth, while that of the male is curved and bears both narrow ridges known as alae and small spines called spicules. The alae form a round plate, allowing males of this species to be distinguished from some closely related species (whose alae form oval shapes or are fused into a simple dilation). Spicules are present on both the left and right sides of the male's tail end and are asymmetrical, with those on the left being far longer.

== Distribution and hosts ==
Like all other species of its genus, Filaria martis is found in the subcutaneous tissues of its mammalian host, with this species parasitizing mainly mammals of the family Mustelidae (weasels and related animals), though members of the family Felidae (cats) are also its known hosts. It has been reported in such hosts from Europe, Africa and Mexico. This species was first discovered in a European pine marten, and other European species it has been reported parasitizing include the beech marten, European polecat, European badger and European mink. Individuals living in beech martens from Italy are particularly well-studied, being the subject of multiple studies published from 1960 onwards. In Africa, known mustelid hosts of F. martis include the honey badger and the striped polecat. Though not a mustelid, an African leopard from Kenya has also been reported as a host for this worm. A record of F. martis in Mexico comes from the state of Nuevo León, where it has been found in an American badger.

=== Reclassified reports ===
The following mammal species have formerly been reported as hosts of Filaria martis, but the worms in these instances have since been reassigned to different species, and thus these mammals are not actually hosts of F. martis proper:

- In 1858, Italian zoologist Raffaele Molin reported that worms of this species had been found in the thoracic cavity of a tayra from Panama. However, Roy C. Anderson pointed out over a century later that these worms are quite certainly misidentified, as F. martis does not inhabit the thoracic cavity of its host.
- German zoologist Anton Schneider reported Filaria quadrispina in a crested porcupine in 1866. As F. quadrispina was later declared a junior synonym of F. martis, Roy C. Anderson reported the porcupine as one of the hosts of F. martis in 1960. However, a 1989 study concluded that this specimen should be reassigned to the species F. bakerhugoti, whose type specimen was found in a Cape porcupine.
- In his study of F. martis published in 1960, Roy C. Anderson analysed some specimens which were found in a South African springhare. In 1989, these specimens were reassigned to the species F. versterae.
