= Muscle arms =

Wall muscle (BWM) membrane extensions

Muscle arms are body wall muscle (BWM) membrane extensions that connect the BWMs to the motor axons of the dorsal and ventral nerve cords in the nematode worm C. elegans. Muscle arms were first described in other nematode species by Anton Schneider (1831 – 1890) in his "Monographie der Nematoden", published in 1866. Subsequent work showed that muscle arms are found in C. elegans and that these structures are abnormal in unc-104, unc-5 and other mutants.
