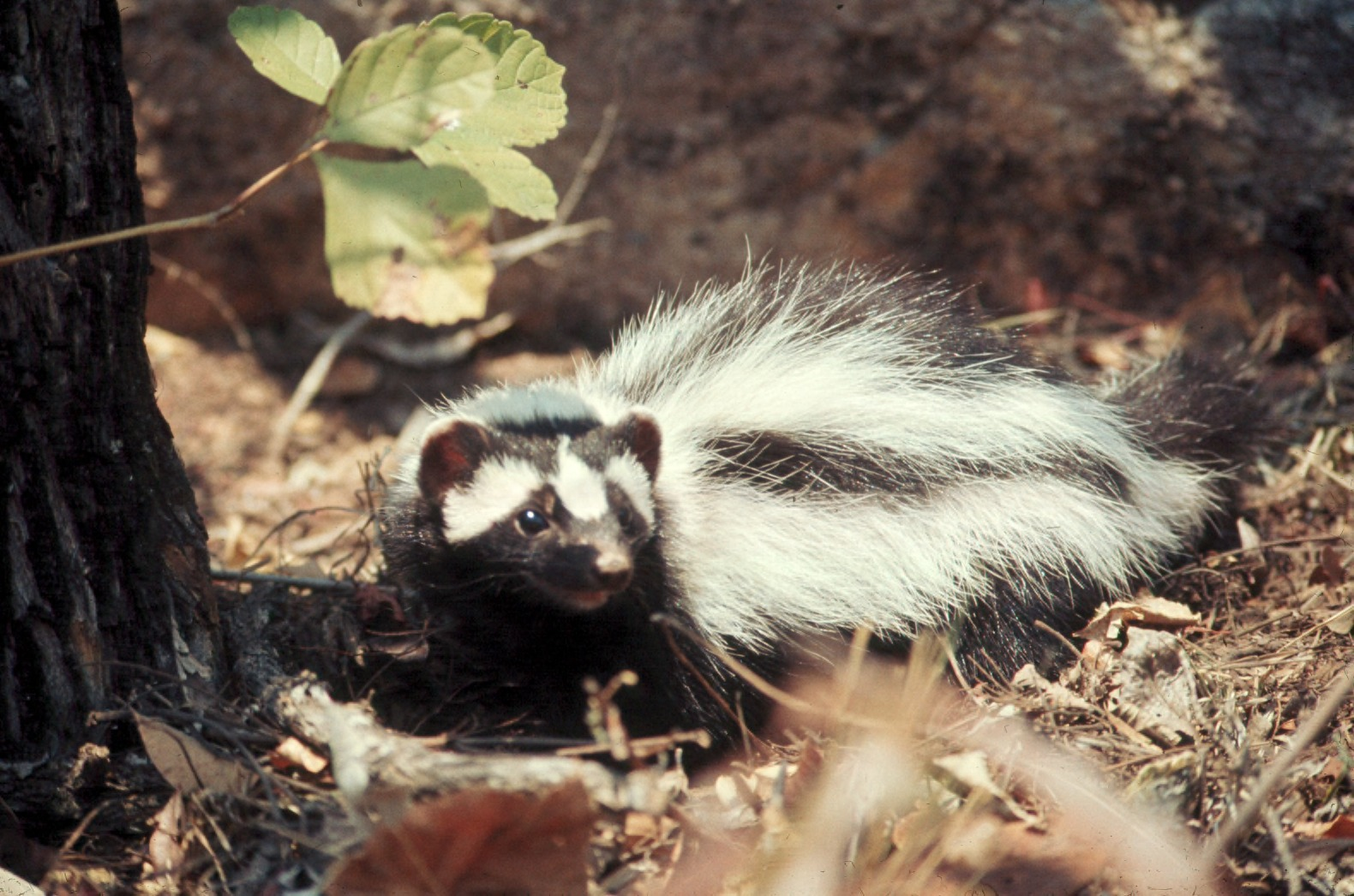

Conservation status
- Least Concern (IUCN 3.1)

Scientific classification
- Kingdom: Animalia
- Phylum: Chordata
- Class: Mammalia
- Infraclass: Placentalia
- Order: Carnivora
- Family: Mustelidae
- Genus: Ictonyx
- Species: I. striatus

Binomial name
- Ictonyx striatus (Perry, 1810)

Subspecies
- See text
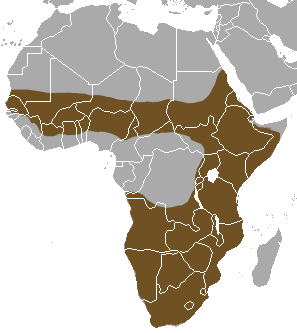
- Striped polecat range

Synonyms
- List: Bradypus striatus Perry, 1810; Mephitis capensis Smith, 1826; Mustela zorilla Fischer, 1829; Putorius zorilla Smith, 1834; Ictonyx capensis Kaup, 1835; Mephitis africana Lichtenstein, 1836; Rhabdogale mustelina Wagner, 1841; Zorilla striata Layard, 1861; Ictonyx limpopoensis Roberts, 1917; Ictonyx orangiae Roberts, 1924; Ictonyx kalaharicus Roberts, 1932

= Striped polecat =

Striped polecat Temporal range: Late Pleistocene - recent, 0.128–0 Ma

Species of mustelid mammal

The striped polecat (Ictonyx striatus), also called the African polecat, zoril, zorille, zorilla, African muishond, striped muishond, Cape polecat, and African skunk, is a species of mammal native to sub-Saharan Africa. Despite bearing some resemblance to a skunk (of the family Mephitidae), it belongs in a separate family known as the Mustelidae, and genetic analysis suggests that its closest living relative is the African striped weasel. It is adaptable and lives in a wide range of habitats and elevations, preferring open environments with lower levels of shrubs. This species measures 30–38 cm (12–15 in) in length excluding the tail, with males growing larger than females. Its fur is mostly black, with distinctive white stripes running down its back and white patches on its face and tail, though the exact patterning is highly variable.

The forelimbs of this animal bear long, curved claws which it uses to excavate burrows or dig for invertebrate prey in soil or dung. The striped polecat is a predatory and mostly carnivorous animal that primarily feeds on insects, rodents and small reptiles, but also eats birds, eggs, amphibians and other invertebrates. A nocturnal creature, it actively forages throughout the night and retreats to a resting area during the day, which is typically a burrow or other crevice. Near its anus, the striped polecat has glands which can spray a nauseating, irritating fluid at potential predators to defend itself. Its striking colouration is an example of aposematism, warning predators of its spray to deter them from attacking, and it takes a defensive stance with its back arched and tail raised before it sprays. Due to this, the striped polecat is rarely targeted by predators, and vehicular collision is a more common cause of death.

The striped polecat is a mostly solitary animal, and adult males are hostile towards one another, though family groups do occur and multiple can be kept together in captivity. Females tolerate males during the breeding season, and after a gestation period of 36 days, the mother gives birth to and raises her litter of two or three young. Newborns have closed eyes and ears, and are almost hairless, with most of their pink skin visible. A variety of different calls are used by striped polecats to communicate with each other, as are behavioural cues and likely olfactic communication involving its odorous fluids. The striped polecat is common across most of its range, despite localized population declines, and is not believed to face any major threats to its overall survival as a species.

== Etymology ==
The generic name Ictonyx combines two Ancient Greek words, iktis (ἴκτις, meaning "marten" or "weasel") and ónux (ὄνυξ, meaning "claw"). The specific name is a Latin word meaning "streaked", in reference to the patterns on the animal's back. Therefore, the scientific name of this animal can be interpreted as "streaked weasel claw" or "streaked marten claw".

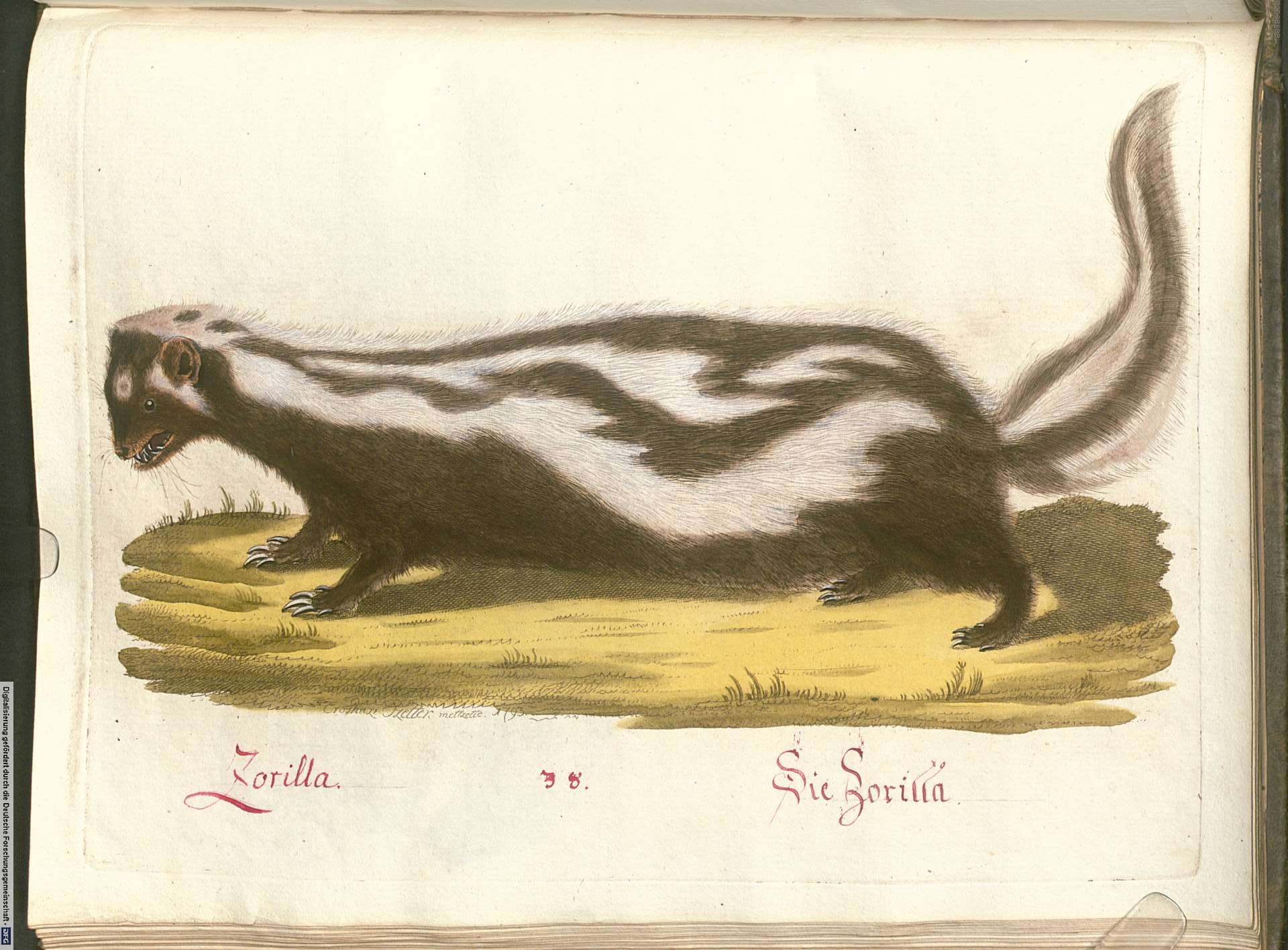
Illustration made in 1794 captioned 'zorilla'

This species has many vernacular names, one of the most common being "striped polecat". The origin of the English word polecat is unknown, but as of 2025 it was thought to come from a combination of the English word cat with the Middle French word poul or pol (meaning "cock"). This word was originally used for the European polecat, referencing its predation on poultry. Another commonly used name is zorilla, sometimes spelled as zorille, which comes from the Spanish word zorrillo (meaning "skunk"), itself a diminutive form of the Spanish zorro (meaning "fox"). The names "African skunk", "African muishond" and "striped muishond" have been used, though the former is inaccurate since this animal belongs in a separate family from true skunks. Muishond is an Afrikaans word derived from the Middle Dutch term muushont, meaning "mouse hound", and is used for various mongoose species.

== Taxonomy ==
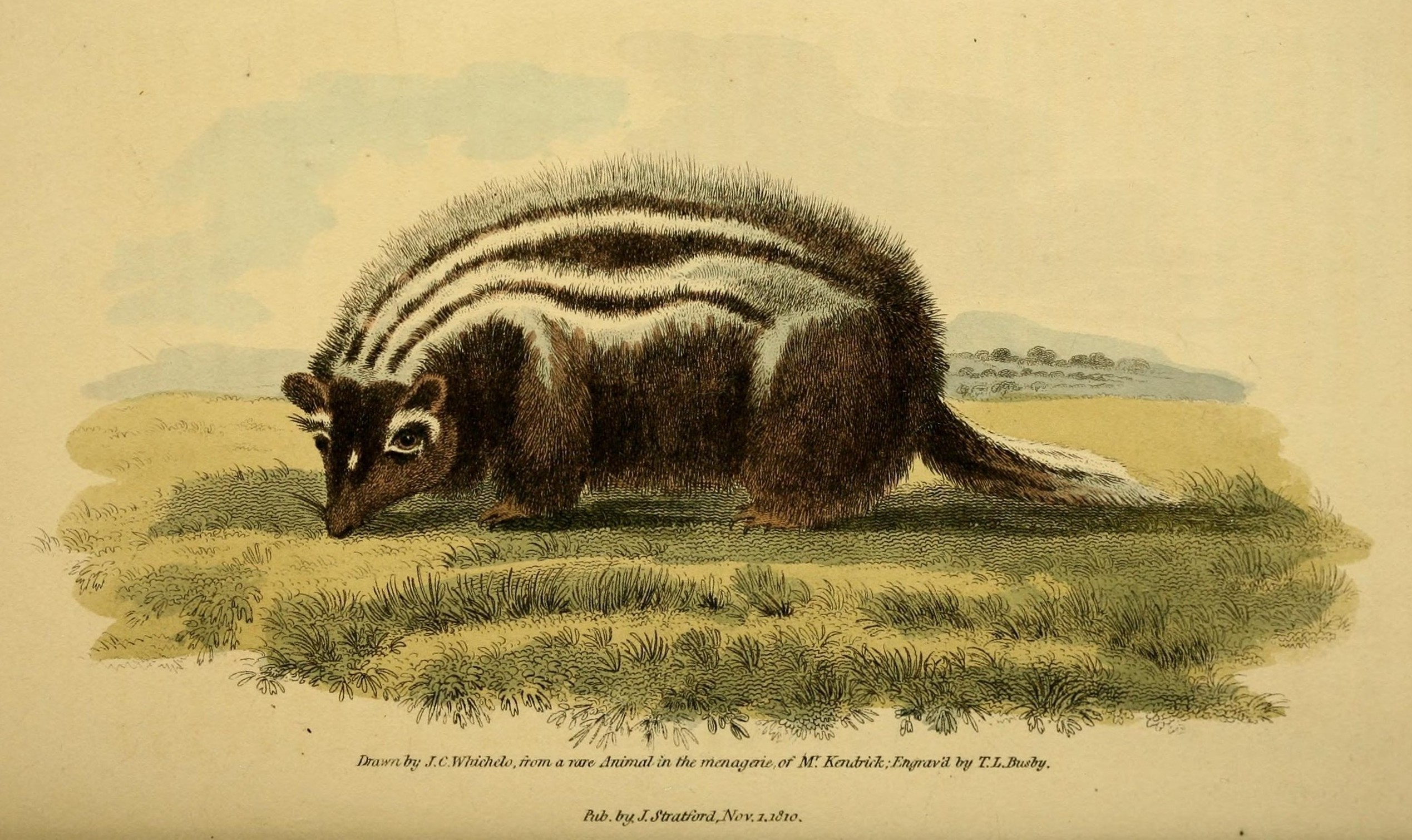
Engraving by Thomas Lord Busby published in the 1810 paper which first described the species, labeled as Bradypus striatus

The oldest scientific description of a striped polecat was published in 1810 by English naturalist George Perry, who described the animal based on an engraving made by English artist Thomas Lord Busby. The individual depicted was seen a few months earlier in London, where it was displayed alive in a travelling menagerie and claimed to be from South America. Soon after the engraving was made, the menagerie had left London, so Perry was unable to examine the living animal in detail. Based on the engraving, Perry could determine that the species was unknown to science, but was uncertain what type of animal it was. He believed it had some similarities to wombats, koalas, bears and weasels, but ultimately described it as a species of sloth in the genus Bradypus, giving it the scientific name Bradypus striatus and the common name "weasel sloth".

More specimens of striped polecats would be analyzed throughout the 19th century, with various authors establishing new species names based on them. They have since been found to represent the same species and the taxa erected based on them are thus considered synonymous. British zoologist Andrew Smith wrote a catalog in 1826 of the mammal specimens in the South African Museum. He believed one specimen represented an unknown species of skunk in the genus Mephitis, and gave it the scientific name Mephitis capensis. Later in 1829, German zoologist Johann Baptist Fischer described a species under the name Mustela zorilla based on specimens from Senegal and the Cape of Good Hope, South Africa, recognizing that it belongs in the family Mustelidae. This species was moved to the genus Putorius by Smith in 1834, renaming it as Putorius zorilla. The genus Ictonyx was established by German naturalist Johann Jakob Kaup in 1835 to contain a single species, which was given the name Ictonyx capensis, marking the first time the striped polecat was assigned to a newly established genus rather than one which already existed. Kaup described the species based on specimens from the Cape of Good Hope, South Africa, which is referenced in the specific name. The name Mephitis africana was erected for the striped polecat by German explorer Hinrich Lichtenstein in 1836, who believed like Smith that it is a species of skunk. However, along with Mustela zorilla, this name was synonymized in 1841 with Rhabdogale mustelina, a taxon established by Johann Andreas Wagner that year.

During the early 1900s, the striped polecat was commonly referred to under the scientific name Zorilla striata, with experts such as Édouard Louis Trouessart and William Lutley Sclater using it in their publications. This name was first used in 1861 by Edgar Leopold Layard. However, it was pointed out by American zoologist Arthur H. Howell in 1906 that this name is invalid; the specific name striata originates from an 1800 publication by George Shaw but is based on Viverra putorius and thus refers to the eastern spotted skunk, while the generic name Zorilla is preoccupied as it was already used by Lorenz Oken in 1816. Howell determined that the proper specific name of the animal should be capensis, as he thought it was the oldest given to it (by Smith in 1826). He concluded that its proper generic name should be Ictonyx since the animal does not belong in any of the other genera it was formerly placed in and requires its own genus, thus assigning it the binomial name Ictonyx capensis. In 1915, American biologist Ned Hollister realized that the "weasel sloth" described by Perry in 1810 is actually a striped polecat and thus likely originated from Africa rather than South America as formerly claimed. With this knowledge, striatus became the oldest valid specific name assigned to the striped polecat, giving it priority over capensis, and the animal's proper binomial name is therefore Ictonyx striatus.

=== Subspecies ===
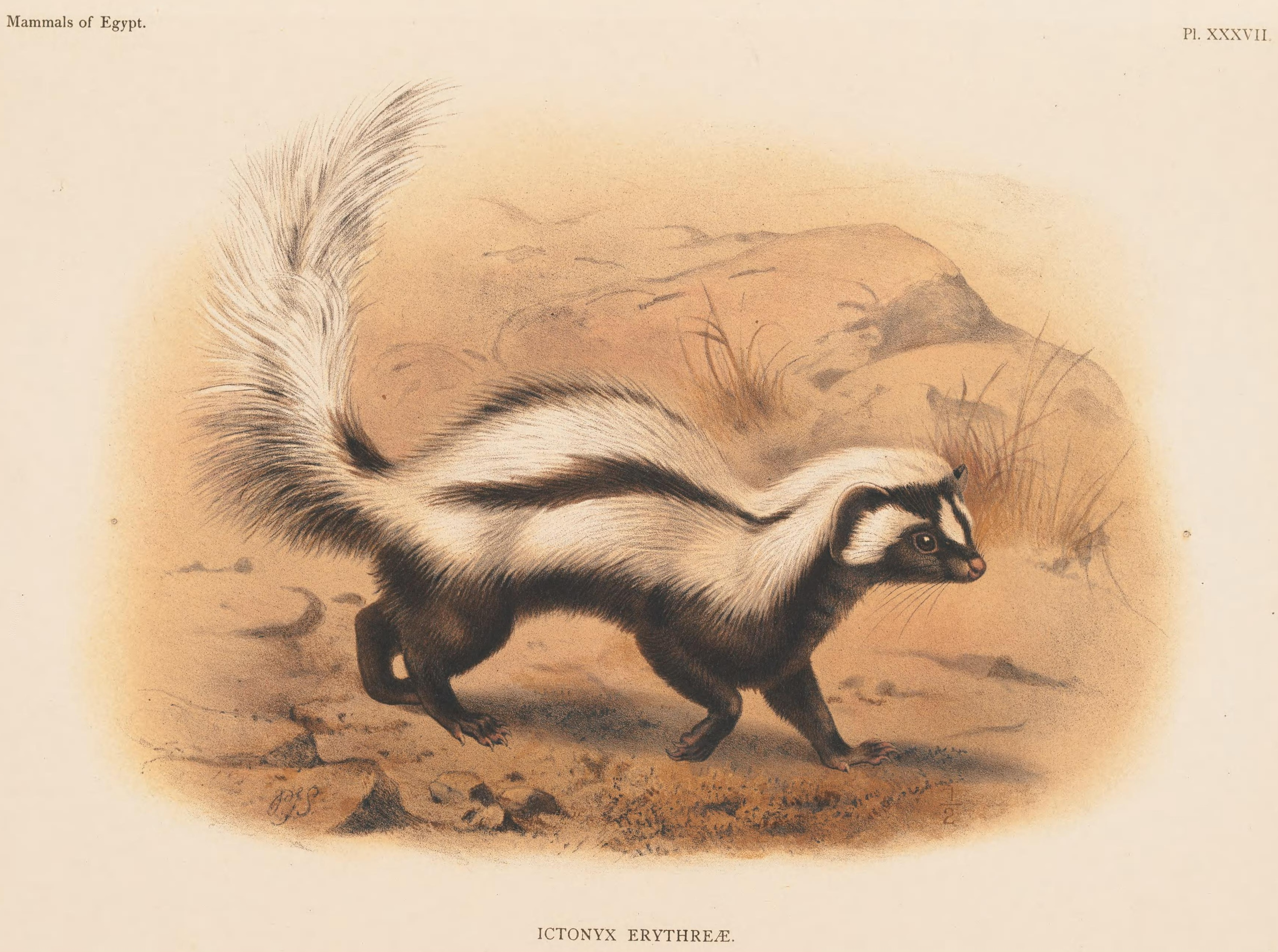
Illustration of the proposed subspecies Ictonyx striatus erythreae published in 1902

A number of striped polecat subspecies have been proposed, though there is debate between different authors as to how many of these are valid. Some authors have categorized them under three groupings based on geography, namely I. s. striatus in southern Africa, I. s. erythrae in northeast and eastern Africa, and I. s. senegalensis in west Africa. However, others believe that the supposed subspecies cannot be consistently distinguished from each other or that their geographic ranges cannot be determined, such that the species is actually monotypic and all proposed subspecies should be considered invalid. The following 19 subspecies were recognized in the third edition of Mammal Species of the World published in 2005:

Subspecies	Trinomial authority	Description	Type locality
I. s. striatus (Nominate subspecies)	Perry, 1810	Largely black, with four white back stripes, a white forehead spot and white patches beneath the ears.	Cape Province, South Africa
I. s. albescens	Heller, 1913	White patterns on the back very extensive, with the black parts of the nape and shoulders reduced to thin stripes.	Summit of Mount Lololokwi, Kenya
I. s. arenarius	Roberts, 1924	Smaller and has larger ears than the nominate subspecies, with broader and pure white stripes (instead of buffy white like some other subspecies).	Lambert's Bay, South Africa
I. s. elgonis	Granvik, 1924	Similar to I. s. albescens but slightly smaller, and the white patterns of the cheeks and forehead are separated by black bars.	Mount Elgon, Kenya
I. s. erythreae	de Winton, 1898	Smaller than the nominate subspecies, with similar coloration to it, but the black dorsal stripes are narrower over the loins and the white patch under the mouth is more extensive in this subspecies.	Habr Heshi, Somaliland
I. s. ghansiensis	Roberts, 1932	Similar to I. s. arenarius but with more white on the back due to the narrower black stripes, and a wider skull.	Gemsbok Pan, South Africa
I. s. giganteus	Roberts, 1932	Much larger than I. s. kalaharicus, with clearly defined black dorsal stripes (though narrower than in the nominate subspecies), and the hind half of the tail is black.	Shorobe, Botswana
I. s. intermedius	Anderson and de Winton, 1902	Smaller than I. s. senegalensis, white patterns on the frontal and in front of the ears commonly merge.	Lado, near Gondokoro, South Sudan
I. s. kalaharicus	Roberts, 1932	The white dorsal stripes are very broad, reducing the black stripes to narrow lines over the shoulder, leaving them clearly visible only behind the shoulders. Hind half of the tail is black.	Kuke Pan, Central Kalahari, Botswana
I. s. lancasteri	Roberts, 1932	Has broad black dorsal stripes, and unlike in other southern African subspecies the white dorsal stripes connect to the white frontal spot.	Choma, Zambia
I. s. limpopoensis	Roberts, 1917	Has very defined back stripes and very little white on the tail (only at the tip) compared to the nominate subspecies, with a small and almost circular frontal spot.	Mooivlei, South Africa
I. s. maximus	Roberts, 1924	Larger than the other South African subspecies, particularly in the skull and teeth, with creamy white stripes like the nominate subspecies.	Wakkerstroom, South Africa
I. s. obscuratus	de Beaux, 1924	Similar to I. s. shoae in size and coloration, but with more white on the back (due to narrower black stripes) and shorter fur.	Luuq, Somalia
I. s. orangiae	Roberts, 1924	Smaller than the nominate subspecies, with narrower white stripes and a discontinuous inner stripe broken in the middle of the back and on the rump.	Angra Pequina, south of Bothaville, South Africa
I. s. ovamboensis	Roberts, 1951	Intermediate in size between I. s. kalaharicus and I. s. giganteus, but with smaller upper carnassial and molar teeth. Tail is largely black, and the black dorsal stripes are clearly defined.	Oshikango, Namibia
I. s. pretoriae	Roberts, 1924	Similar to I. s. orangiae but with larger upper carnassial teeth and scantier fur on the underside.	Boekenhoutfontein, South Africa
I. s. senegalensis	Fischer, 1829	White patterns wider than in the nominate subspecies.	Senegal
I. s. shoae	Thomas, 1906	Slightly larger than the nominate subspecies, with a tail less white and a larger frontal spot.	Addis Ababa, Ethiopia
I. s. shortridgei	Roberts, 1932	Very large subspecies, the black dorsal stripes are narrower in the front part of the body, tail is whiter than in the South African subspecies.	Maschi River at the border of the Caprivi Strip, Namibia

=== Evolution ===
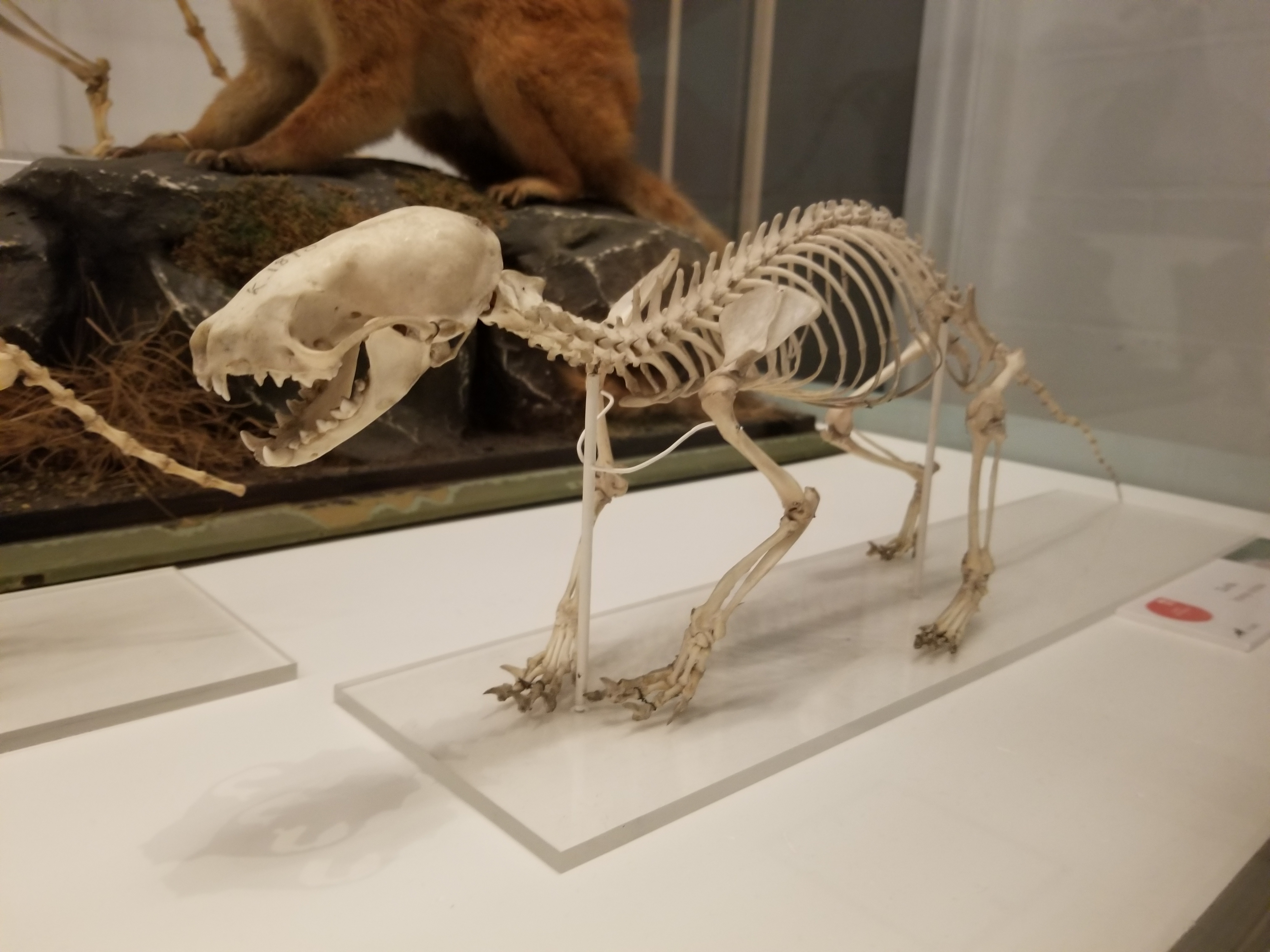
Mounted skeleton displayed in the Museum of Zoology, Cambridge

The striped polecat is the type species of the genus Ictonyx, and belongs to the subfamily Ictonychinae (which the genus lends its name to) within the family Mustelidae. Members of Ictonychinae can be split into two tribes, namely Ictonychini and Lyncodontini. This species is part of the former tribe, which it shares with the African striped weasel, Saharan striped polecat and marbled polecat. Genetic analysis has revealed that the closest living relative of the striped polecat is the African striped weasel, with multiple studies recovering the two as sister taxa. A study published in 2008 proposed that the lineages of these two species diverged between 2.7 and 2.2 million years ago, whereas a later study from 2012 suggested an earlier date between 4.3 and 3.4 million years ago for this divergence. The following cladogram shows the position of the striped polecat among its closest living relatives according to Gray et al. (2022):

- Ictonychinae
  - Galictis vittata (Greater grison)
  - - Vormela peregusna (Marbled polecat)
    - - Ictonyx libycus (Saharan striped polecat)
      - - Ictonyx striatus (Striped polecat)
        - Poecilogale albinucha (African striped weasel)

The Saharan striped polecat is sometimes placed in the genus Ictonyx along with the striped polecat, whereas the African striped weasel is the only species assigned to the genus Poecilogale. Such placements would make Ictonyx a paraphyletic grouping, so some authors suggest placing the Saharan striped polecat in a genus called Poecilictis instead, making Ictonyx a monotypic genus containing only the striped polecat.

Fossilized remains of striped polecats have been discovered in several Pleistocene-aged localities in South Africa, such as Die Kelders Cave, Blombos Cave, and a fissure fill in Swartklip. Among the oldest specimens originate from the Sea Harvest Site in Saldanha Bay, and likely date back to a cooler phase of the Last Interglacial, between 128,000 and 74,000 years ago. An extinct species known from fossils found in Laetoli, Tanzania has been named Ictonyx harrisoni, and would have lived 3.85 to 3.63 million years ago during the Early Pliocene epoch. Though smaller than the striped polecat and differing in tooth structure, I. harrisoni is mostly similar to the extant animal and is therefore placed in the same genus. Another fossil species was formerly assigned to Ictonyx and named Ictonyx bolti in 1985, as it was believed at the time that the striped polecat is its closest living relative. However, further analysis has shown that it is more closely related to the African striped weasel, so in 1987 it was moved to its own separate genus named Propoecilogale.

== Physical characteristics ==
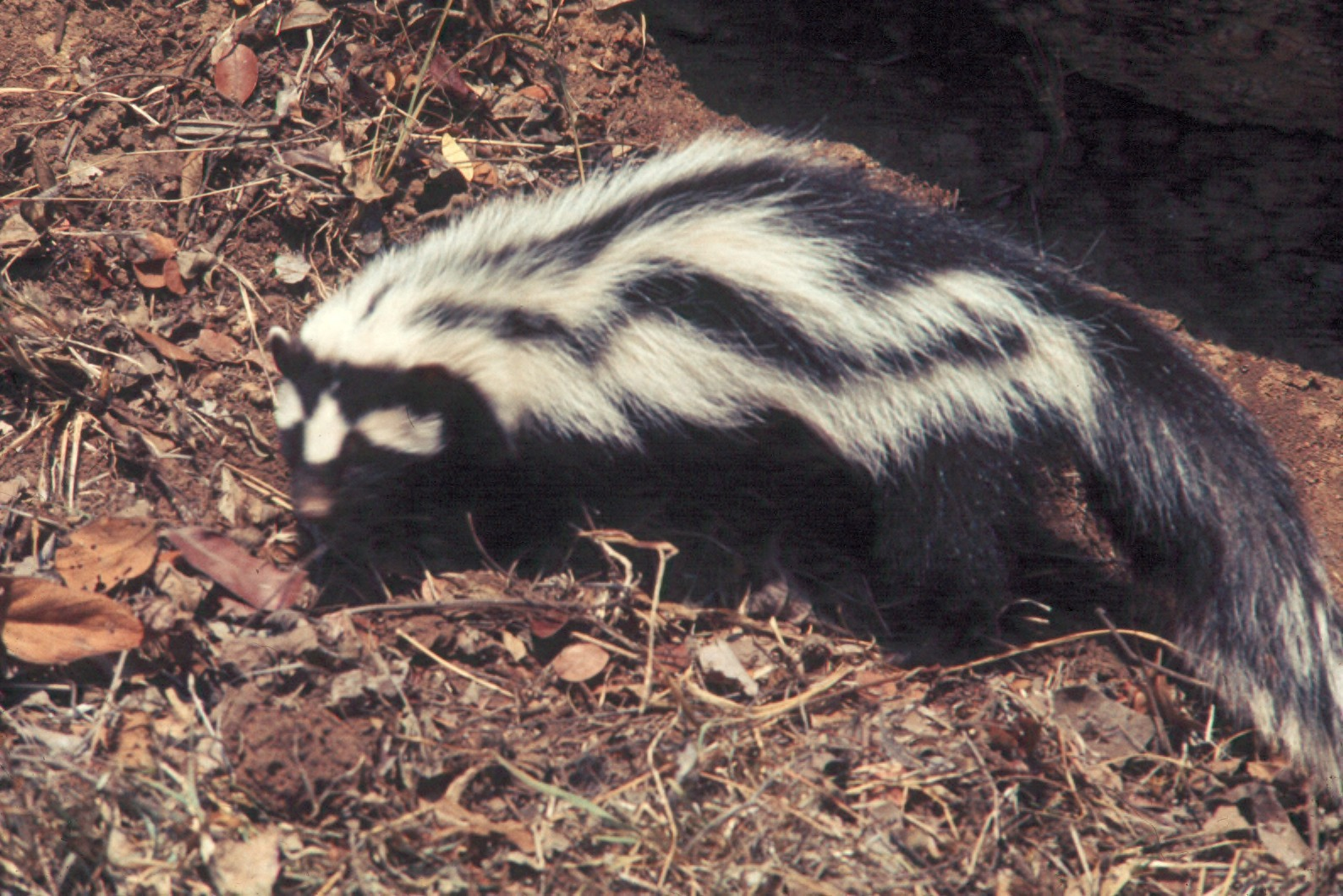
Seen from a slightly raised perspective, with the stripes running down its back clearly visible

The striped polecat grows about 30–38 cm (12–15 in) in length excluding the tail (which adds an additional 22–30 cm (8.7–11.8 in)), and weighs from 0.7 to 1.4 kg (1.5 to 3.1 lb). This species exhibits sexual dimorphism in size, with males being the larger of the two sexes and weighing about 50% more than the females. The specific coloring varies by location. Generally the striped polecat is primarily black, with a wide white band at the back of the head which splits into four white stripes extending down the animal's back and towards the tail. The underside and limbs are entirely black. Both black and white colouration is present on the tail, with the base generally being black, but the colour proportion is variable between individuals. The head is mostly black, with two large white cheek patches stretching from below the ears to the back of the eyes, a white spot on the forehead, and white fringes on the ears, though the exact extent and size of these facial patterns is highly variable. The cheek patches and the forehead spot are usually distinctly separate, but may be merged into a single white band in some West African individuals. Like many other mustelids, the striped polecat has glands near its anus which can expel a noxious fluid when it feels threatened, and its distinctive patterns are an example of aposematic colouration, serving as a warning to potential predators.

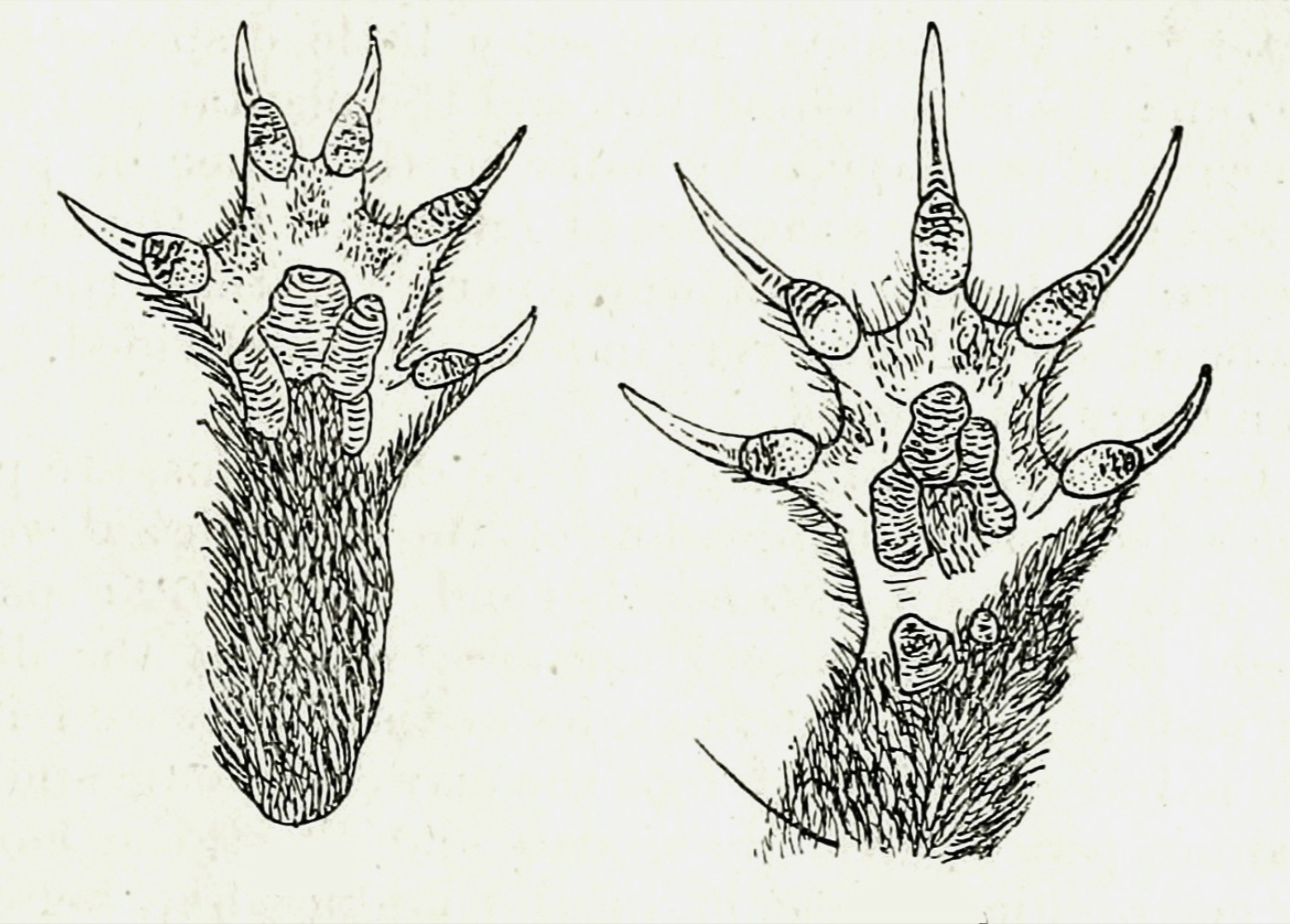
Illustration depicting the undersides of the hind (on the left) and front (on the right) right paws

The fur on the back is silky and long, growing 50–60 mm (2.0–2.4 in) in length, while that on the head is shorter and only 6–7 mm (0.24–0.28 in). The tail fur is particularly long, reaching 70–80 mm (2.8–3.1 in), giving the tail a bushy appearance. All claws and digits touch the ground when the animal is walking, and their impressions can be seen in the footprints. Five digits are present on each of the four limbs, with each digit bearing a claw. The claws of the front limbs are longer and more curved than those of the hind limbs, with the former growing about 18 mm (0.71 in) while the latter tend to only measure 10 mm (0.39 in). The front paws are larger than the hind paws, and the soles of all four paws are hairless. Each paw is narrow and most of the digits are spread wide apart, though the third and fourth digits of each hind paw are close together. Every digit has an oval-shaped pad, and each paw has a four-lobed pad forming a shape with a notch in the back, with each front paw having two additional carpal pads on the wrist area. All of these pads have coarse grooves.

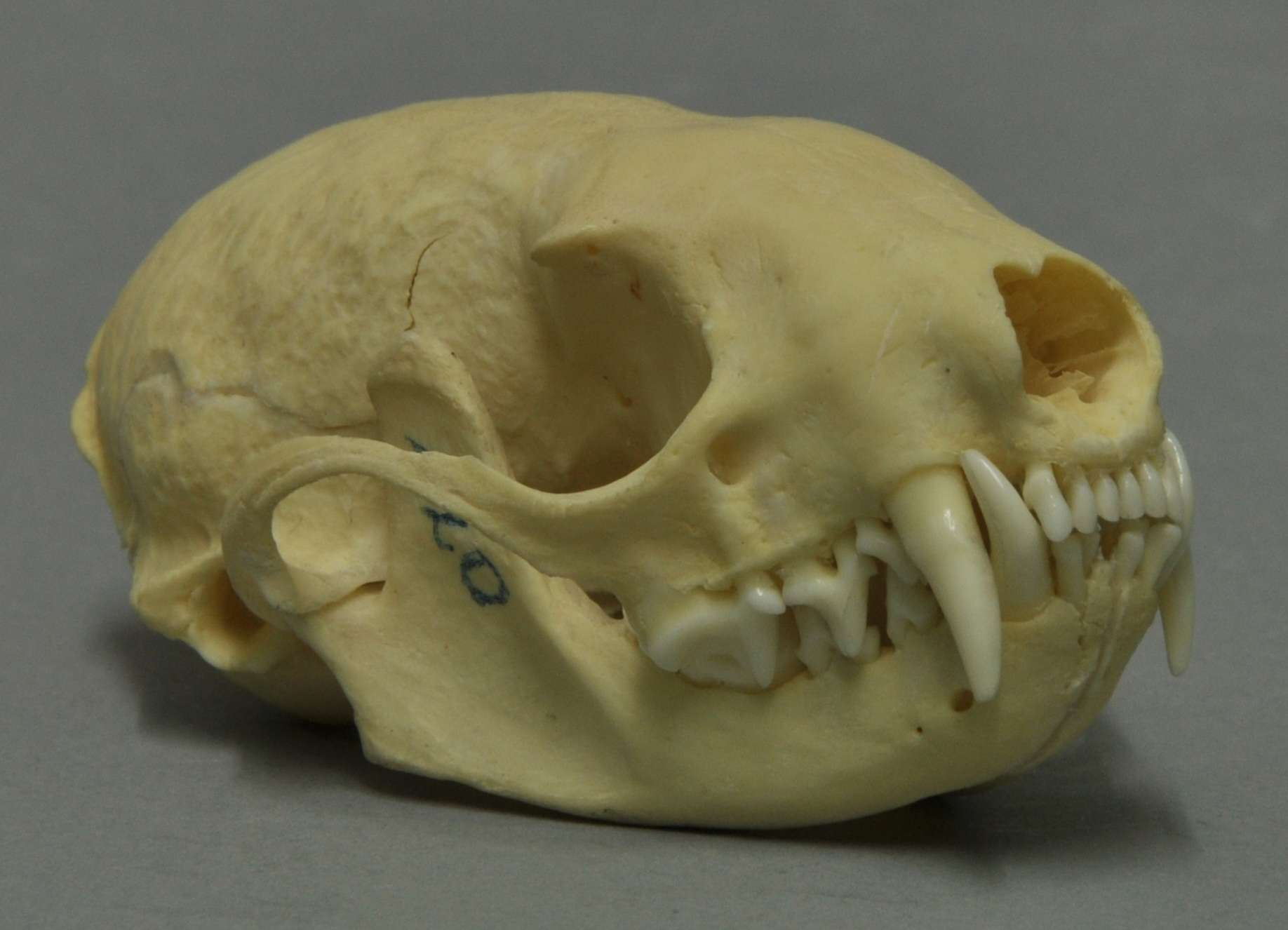
Skull

The skull is heavily built, with a braincase that is wide at the back and becomes narrower towards the front, and a short, blunt snout. The palate is wide in its hind portion, becoming narrower past where the molar teeth are. The eyes are near the front of the head, with the distance between the front edges of the eye sockets and the tip of the maxilla being only a quarter the length of the entire skull. There is no sagittal crest in this species, though two low ridges serving as attachments for the temporalis muscles are visible from the supraoccipital crests (at the back of the skull) to the postorbital processes (behind the eye sockets). The auditory bullae (bony structures containing the middle and inner ears) are wide and flat, and the zygomatic arches (arch-like bones in the cheeks) are wider at their bases than at their centers. The dentition has a dental formula of 3.1.3.13.1.3.2, that is, three incisors, one canine and three premolars in each half of either jaw, with each half of the upper jaw having one molar while that of the lower jaw has two, giving a total of 34 teeth. The canines are short and robust, with the lower canines bending backwards at their tips, and the outer incisors of the upper jaw are longer than the inner incisors, being used alongside the canines to subdue prey. The molars have broad grinding surfaces, allowing the animal to crush food, especially insects.

== Distribution and habitat ==
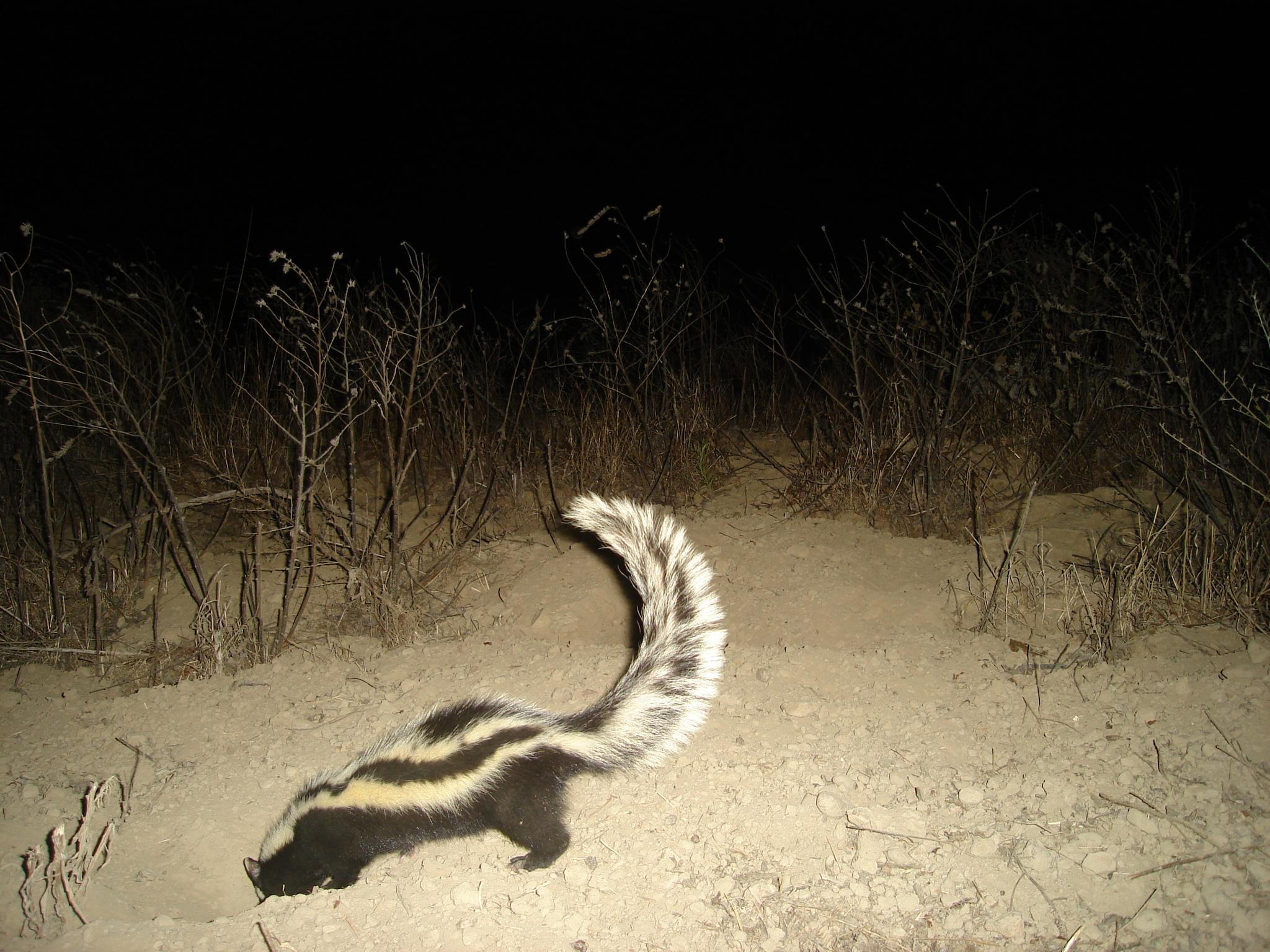
Wild individual seen in Cape Town, South Africa

Endemic to Africa, the striped polecat is an adaptable animal and very widespread across the continent. It inhabits most of Sub-Saharan Africa, ranging from Mauritania across to southeastern Egypt in the north, and stretching down south to South Africa. However, it is absent from the dense rainforests of West Africa and the Congo Basin, as well as the dry areas of northeast Somalia and Ethiopia. Even so, the species tolerates many types of habitats, occurring in grasslands, forests, rocky areas, and deserts. It can inhabit dry areas if scrub cover is present, having been recorded from the hummocks and sand dunes of the Namib Desert, but can be found in regions with high rainfall. It appears to prefer open environments, possibly because the exposure makes other small carnivores vulnerable to predation (especially from birds of prey), whereas the striped polecat can defend itself with its noxious spray, thus reducing competition. Most often, it is found in habitats with large ungulate populations, because of the lower level of shrubs where these grazers occur. The striped polecat occurs in a wide range of elevations, from sea level up to as high as 4,180 m (13,710 ft) above sea level as evidenced by sightings on Mount Kenya. It is not confined to natural environments and even enters areas developed by human activity such as plantations and gardens.

== Behaviour and biology ==
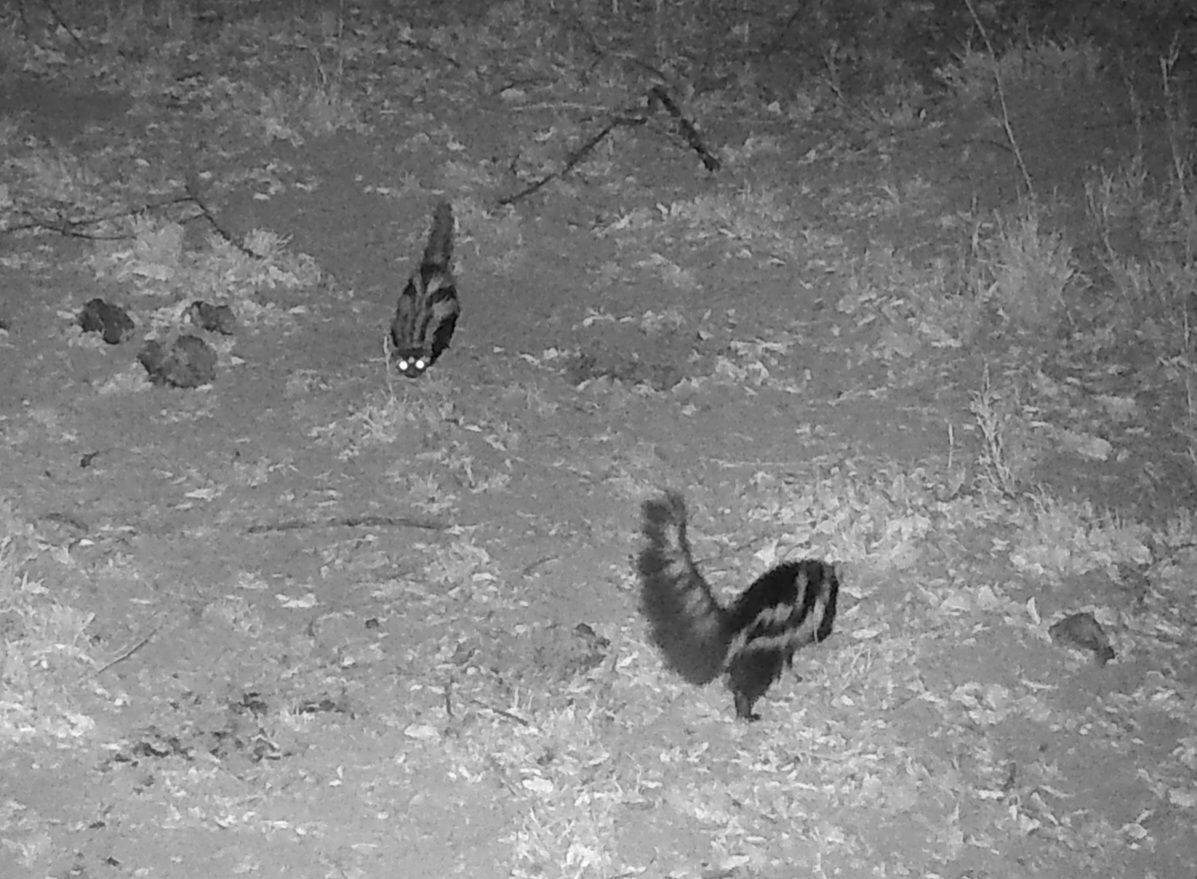
Though mostly solitary, striped polecats sometimes occur in pairs.

The striped polecat is a generally solitary creature, though it is sometimes seen in pairs, and groups with more than two individuals are often small family groups consisting of a mother and her young. Males and females mostly remain separate and tolerate each other's presence during mating, whereas adult males are hostile towards one another. Multiple family groups can be kept together in captivity with minimal conflict and even groom each other, suggesting they are not exclusively territorial. Several studies published from 1971 onwards have stated that striped polecat populations show male-biased sex ratios, with the male to female ratios ranging from 1.61:1 in KwaZulu-Natal to 3.3:1 in the former Cape Province. This may be because the males are more active and willing to approach unfamiliar objects, making them more easily surveyed.

The species walks with a gait similar to that of a skunk, with its back slightly arched and tail extending horizontally in line with the body while trotting slowly. Though it can swim and climb trees, it tends to avoid doing either. It is nocturnal, hunting mostly at night and retreating to rest during the day. Resting areas include burrows, gaps underneath buildings and rocks, hollow logs, and even tree branches up to 3 m (9.8 ft) above the ground. This animal is a powerful digger, using the claws on its front limbs excavate its own burrows, though it often inhabits burrows made by other animals instead. Burrow usage is often temporary, though mothers with young tend to stick to one burrow unless there is disturbance.

=== Reproduction ===
The breeding season of the striped polecat has a long duration, though the exact time of year varies between different populations. In KwaZulu-Natal, it lasts from spring to the end of summer, with the testes of the male remaining large from September to April (spring to early autumn) and being shrunken for the rest of the year. Elsewhere in South Africa, juveniles and pregnant females have been recorded in April and from September to December. In the area around Lake Chad, young individuals have been seen from September to November, suggesting the local population breeds during the rainy season. Sightings of juveniles in East Africa are reported in the months of February, June, September and October. Striped polecats kept in zoos (specifically the National Zoological Park, Toronto Zoo and Wilhelma) have given birth throughout the year, suggesting that in captivity there is no restriction on the breeding period.

Though usually hostile towards males, a female is more tolerant of them when she is receptive, crouching in front of males and allowing them to smell her vulva, sometimes taking a submissive stance with the neck extended, mouth open and head turned to the side. The male then pulls her into a covered area by the back of her neck. This process may repeat several times before copulation, during which the male mounts the female, occasionally biting the back of her neck, while his forelimbs are clasped around her lumbar area as she remains crouched. Copulation may last between 25 and 106 minutes, during which the male thrusts his pelvis with pauses in between, while the female makes loud yapping and shrieking sounds. After conception, the gestation period for a striped polecat is about 36 days. The female generally gives birth to one litter per year of two to three young, but may breed more than once if the litter is lost early. When giving birth, the mother lies on her side, regularly licking her genital area while one hind leg is raised. She licks and noses each newborn right after it is born, and ignores it while she delivers the remaining young. The mother protects her young until they are able to survive on their own.

The newborns are altricial and completely vulnerable; they are born blind, deaf, and almost hairless. They are only 110–115 mm (4.3–4.5 in) long and weigh about 15 g (0.53 oz) at birth, and while eye slits and external ear flaps are visible, both are closed. They appear mostly pink because their skin is visible, though dark stripes are already present at this age. The mother carries her newborns in her mouth by their shoulders or back, and when they reach three weeks old she lifts them by the scruff of the neck instead. At an age of ten days, white hair grows to cover the young, and they begin crawling short distances. The distinctive black and white stripes become visible between 19 and 21 days after birth, and at 39 days they start to walk. The eyes start to open when they are 35 days old, and are fully open after another week. Lower milk canine teeth erupt at 32 days, at which point the young begin eating the soft parts of prey killed by their mother, and permanent canines grow in before the milk canines are all shed. Young which have begun eating solid food suckle less, and by an age of eight weeks are weaned.

=== Defense mechanisms ===
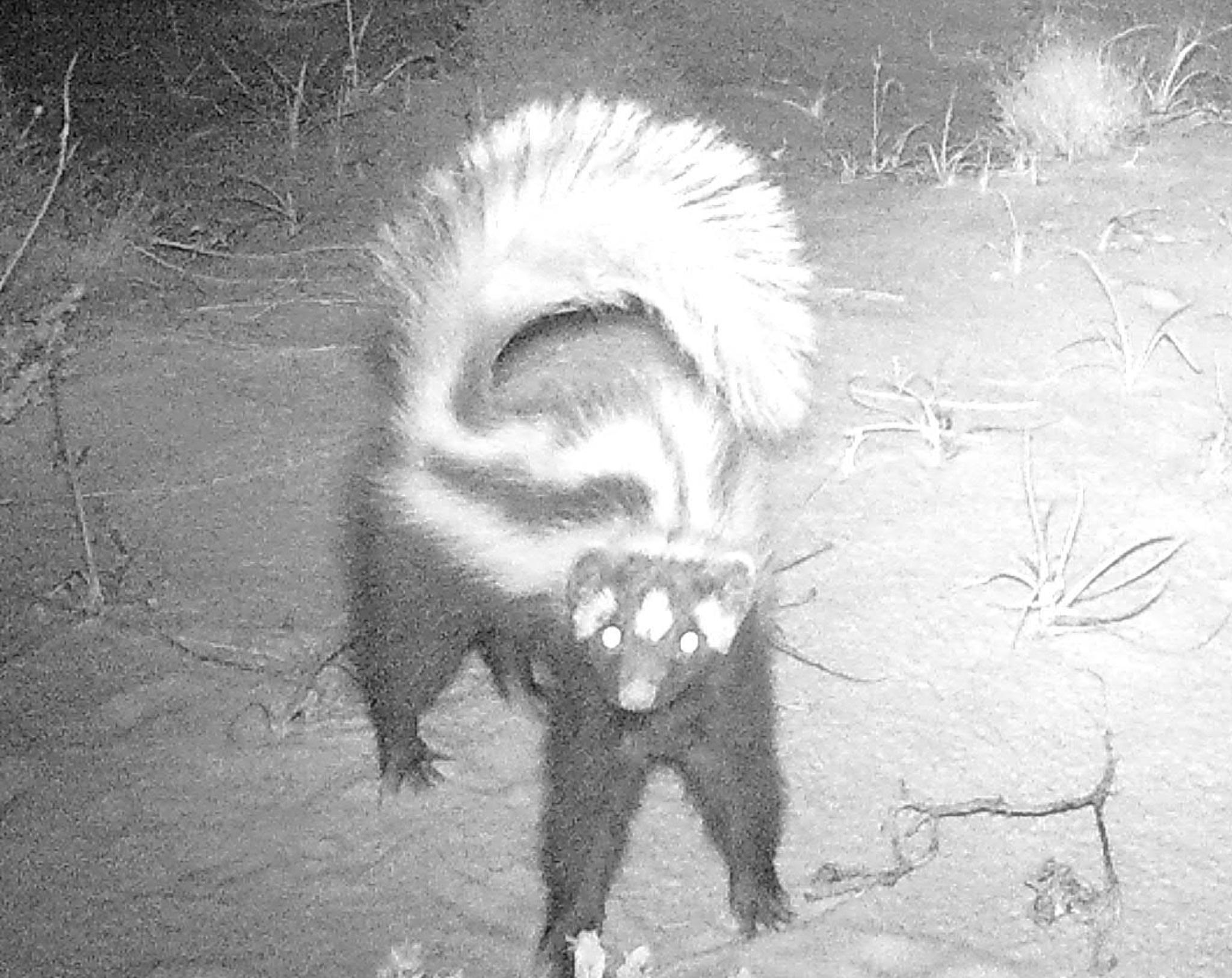
Performing a threat display in Addo Elephant National Park, South Africa

When threatened, the striped polecat commonly flees by quickly entering its burrow. If unable to do so, it takes a deimatic (threat display) stance with its back arched, rear end facing the opponent, and tail straight up in the air or curled over its back, sometimes making a squeal-like noise. If the threat has still not been warded off, the polecat sprays a foul-smelling fluid from glands near its anus. This fluid is made up of a light, yellow oil and a translucent, colourless water-like phase. It is nauseating and very irritating to the eyes, serving as a defense against predators, in a similar manner to skunks. The odour effectively repels most mammalian predators, though birds tend to be more tolerant of scents. Considering that the sprays of skunks repel hawks successfully, and that the striped polecat's spray likely has a similar composition, this method of defence may still work against birds of prey.

On occasion, the striped polecat feigns death when faced by predators. When doing so, it lies limp on the ground with its back facing upwards, displaying its stripes to the threats. This patterning is an example of aposematism, warning that the polecat can defend itself with its spray and that it tastes foul. The noxious spray contaminates some of the animal's fur, especially that of the tail, deterring any predators which try to bite it while it feigns death. A striped polecat may continue feigning death for over 30 minutes while waiting for its attacker to lose interest and leave.

=== Communication ===
Striped polecats communicate with each other using myriad verbal signals and calls. Growls act as a warning to possible predators, competitors, or other enemies to back off. High-amplitude screams signify situations of high aggression, sometimes preceding the spraying of anal emissions or combat. An undulating high- to low-pitched scream conveys surrender or submission to an adversary, accompanying the subsequent release of the loser. Conversely, a faster, lower-amplitude undulating call has been interpreted as a friendly salutation. Mating calls are common forms of communication between the sexes. Adolescent polecats have a specific set of calls and signals, either signifying distress when separated from their mother or to contact her when she enters their shared burrow.

Visual communication is used by the striped polecat. When angered or startled, the hair on its back and tail automatically become erect, making the animal appear larger. During friendly interactions with others of its kind, a striped polecat presents its black underbelly, contrasting how it displays the stripes on its back when threatened. Olfactic communication involving the fluids of the anal glands likely plays a part in regulating social interactions.

== Ecology ==
=== Diet and feeding ===
Like other mustelids, the striped polecat is a predator. It has 34 sharp teeth for shearing flesh and grinding meat, and a broad generalist diet including various small animals. It can hunt by both vision and smell, and may dig into soil or dung to reach burrowing prey. Analysis of stomach contents has shown that across its range, insects are the most important component of its diet, followed by murid rodents and then reptiles, though more reptiles than rodents may be eaten in arid regions. Plant material may be consumed, as evidenced by some seeds (possibly ground nuts) in the stomach of one individual, but this is much more rarely eaten than meat. Most prey species taken are small, though larger animals up to the size of a hare are eaten. In one exceptional incident, a striped polecat attacked the newborn calf of a nyala.

Prey may be captured on the ground or extracted from beneath the surface by digging, but the striped polecat does not attempt to catch prey in the air; if it sees a flying or jumping insect, it goes where the prey lands and captures it there. When searching for subterranean invertebrates, the striped polecat pushes its snout into the soil and audibly sniffs, and uses its forelimbs to excavate its prey after detecting it. Most smaller vertebrate prey (including amphibians, lizards, birds and small rodents) is killed with a bite to the skull, sometimes while pinning it down with one or both forelimbs (though this is never done for birds). Larger prey such as rats (whose skulls the polecat cannot bite through) tend to require pinning down with forelimbs and multiple bites to the neck, head or chest to dispatch, and the predator may even roll around or somersault while biting onto the neck. When preying on snakes, the striped polecat bites the snake's back and briefly shakes it vigorously before retreating, moving swiftly to avoid the snake's strikes. This is repeated four to five times to paralyze the prey, after which the polecat pins it down with its forelimbs and kills the reptile with a bite near the head.

The striped polecat may carry prey in its mouth or drag larger prey backwards towards its den before eating, and if it has killed more prey than it needs, it may hoard some in its den. It commonly eats in a crouched position, sometimes using its forelimbs to hold its food while doing so. Prey is usually eaten whole from the head first, though the feathers and legs of birds and the stomachs of rodents are sometimes left uneaten. One red-lipped snake was reportedly eaten tail first, possibly because the polecat could not distinguish which end was the head after the reptile died. Larger animals (including rats and mole snakes) are skinned before they are eaten from the shoulder or flank first.

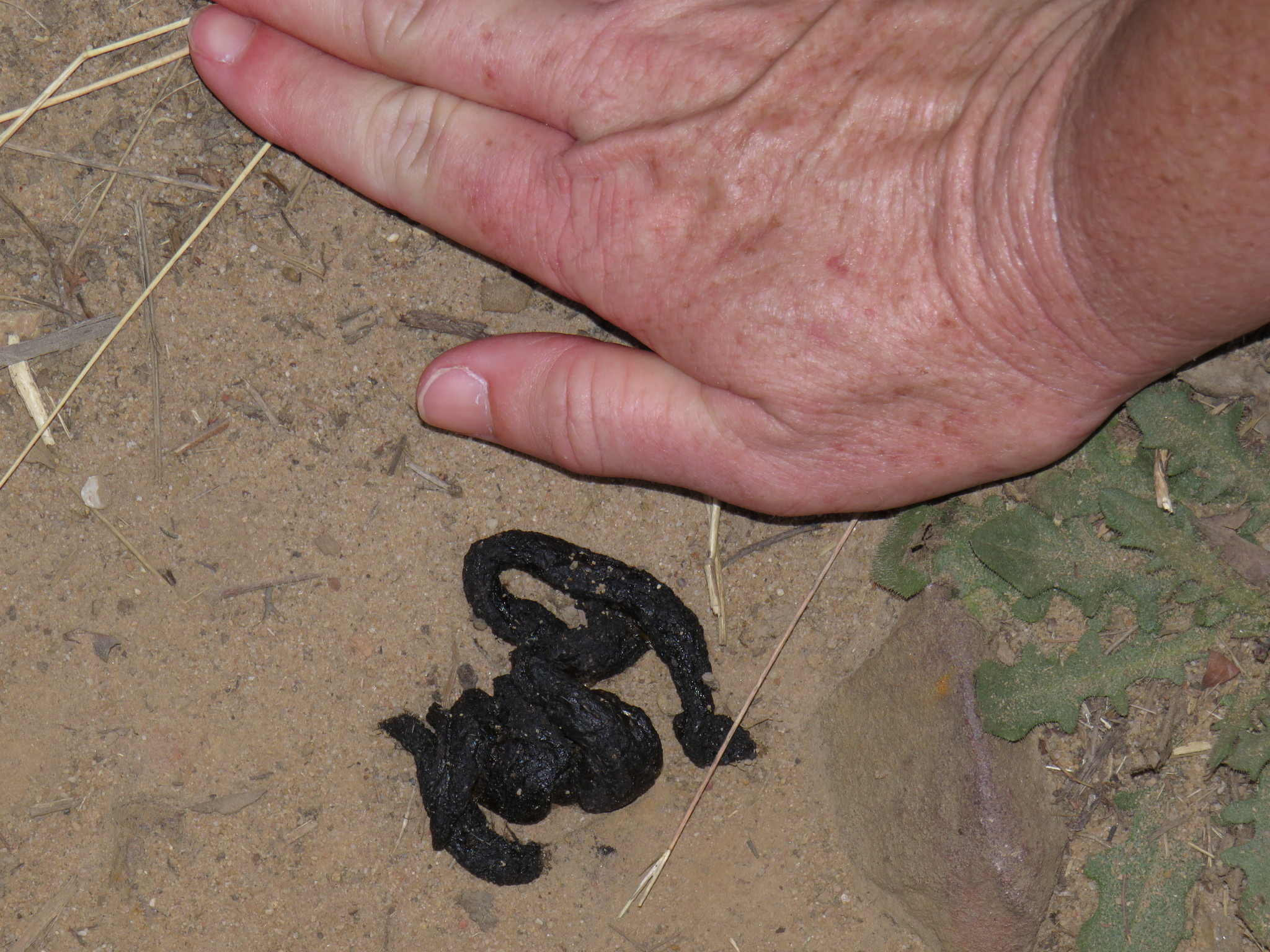
Feces found in Table Mountain National Park, South Africa, with a human hand for scale

Killing prey is an innate behaviour, as evidenced by how young striped polecats reared in isolation can do so at the same age as those raised by their mothers, and using the same methods as wild adults. However, egg breaking is not innate, and captive individuals often show little interest in unbroken chicken eggs or fail to break the shells, though they lap up the contents of eggs and recognize them as food after learning to break them by biting or rolling them against hard objects. Although the striped polecat consumes most amphibians it encounters, it notably does not eat bufonid toads, likely as they are poisonous and unpalatable. The striped polecat has a high metabolic rate and a short gut between 3.2 and 4.3 times the length of its body (excluding the tail), such that food passes through quickly and is excreted via defecation about 165 minutes after consumption. The animal must therefore actively forage throughout the night to meet its energy requirements.

This species does not drink water frequently, instead obtaining most of its required moisture through its food. When it does drink, it laps water up using its tongue. A male kept in a cage during winter for two weeks did not drink at all during this time, and only drank small amounts of water occasionally when the weather was hot. Captive females with nursing young have been observed dipping their necks or entire undersides into water during very hot weather, possibly to both cool themselves and carry water to their young.

=== Mortality and disease ===
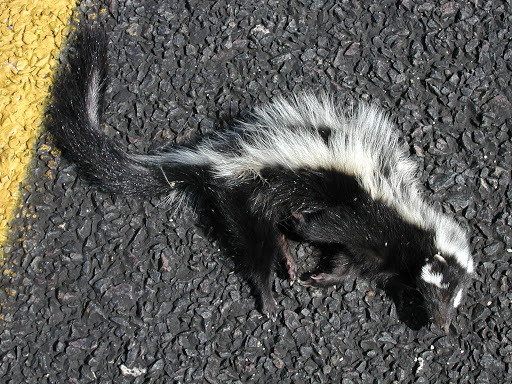
Roadkill carcass in Botswana

The lifespan of a striped polecat is short, commonly only four or five years in the wild, though captive individuals may survive for over 13 years. Most predators avoid targeting this species due to its pungent and irritating spray, and it makes no effort to conceal itself when foraging, though domestic dogs do attack them. Multiple instances of brown hyenas attacking striped polecats have been recorded, but in only one did the hyena successfully kill its target. The hyena in this incident was a cub whose mother recently died and was likely struggling to find sufficient food, only eating the polecat out of desperation. Furthermore, only 0.3% of brown hyena feces contain striped polecat hair, indicating the hyenas rarely prey on this species. Road collisions likely cause more striped polecat deaths than any other factors in modern times. Multiple members of a family group often end up killed on roads as they do not leave the area when one member is run over. Compared to the bodies of other animals such as antelopes and hares, the carcasses of striped polecats attract very few scavengers, with only vultures occasionally feeding on them. Therefore, roadkill bodies of striped polecats tend to remain on the road for much greater durations.

Two nematode species are known endoparasites of the striped polecat, namely Filaria martis and Hepaticofilaria pachycephalum. Dissections of 21 striped polecat carcasses from KwaZulu-Natal revealed that four of these individuals had parasitic nematodes in their stomachs. A malaria-causing parasite, Plasmodium roubaudi, has been found in a striped polecat from Senegal. Rabies has been recorded in this mustelid. Ixodid ticks are known exoparasites of this mammal, with the species Haemaphysalis zumpti and possibly Haemaphysalis leachi having been found on two individuals from South Africa.

=== Competitors ===
Throughout most of Africa, the ecological niches of small carnivores are mostly occupied by mongooses, and genets are also present, both of which overlap considerably with the striped polecat in range and diet. Though competition with these animals could occur, the striped polecat may largely avoid this in having slightly different habits; its diet consist of more mammals and birds than those of mongooses, and less plant matter than those of genets. Another species of small mustelid, the African striped weasel, coexists with the striped polecat, and tends to be the rarer of the two in regions where they overlap. However, the African striped weasel has a very specialized diet made up almost entirely of small rodents, with birds being taken occasionally, and enters burrows to reach its prey. In contrast, the striped polecat has a more generalist diet which includes more insects and reptiles, and it catches rodents above ground. This niche partitioning reduces competition between these two mustelids.

== Conservation ==
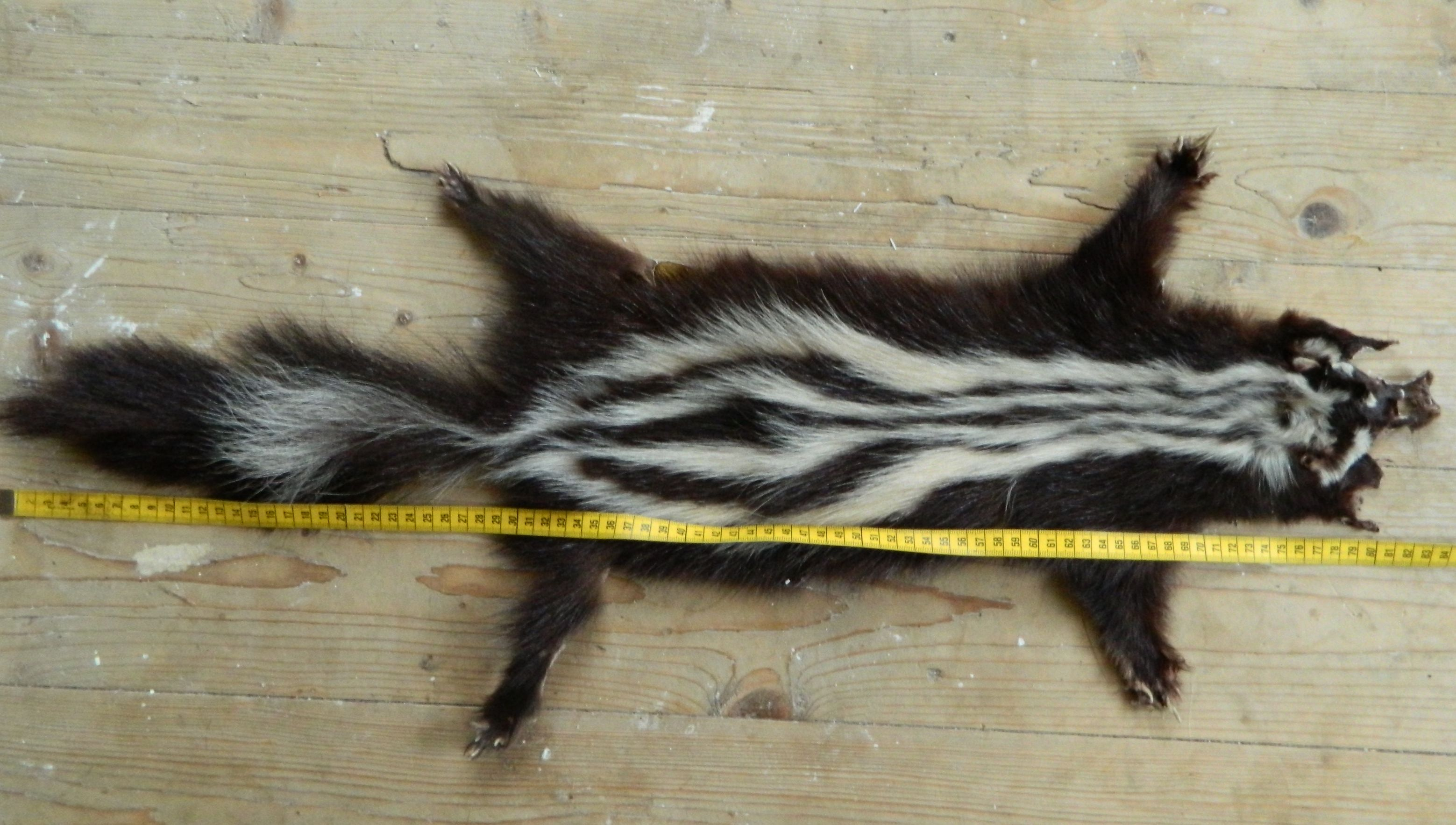
Fur skin

The IUCN listed the striped polecat as Least Concern in 1996, 2008 and 2015, as it is widespread across Africa including in multiple protected areas. Though sightings of it are rare, this can be attributed to its nocturnal habits, making it unlikely to cross paths with people. Easily tamed even as adults, humans sometimes collect this species as a pet, occasionally removing the fluid glands near the anus to make it more suitable as such, though there are reports of this fluid being harvested for use as a perfume. Some striped polecats are killed by humans for preying on poultry, and increasing numbers of humans and free-ranging dogs in rural areas may be causing local population declines in this animal, but these threats are not believed to be significant to the species as a whole.
