= Filaria =

Scientific classification
- Kingdom: Animalia
- Phylum: Nematoda
- Class: Chromadorea
- Order: Rhabditida
- Family: Filariidae
- Genus: Filaria; Mueller, 1787

Genus of roundworms

Filaria is a genus of nematodes belonging to the family Filariidae.

The genus has cosmopolitan distribution.

Species:

- Filaria acutiuscula Molin, 1858
- Filaria bufonis Molin, 1858
- Filaria loliginis Delle Chiaje, 1829
- Filaria martis Gmelin, 1791
- Filaria piscium Rudolphi, 1809
- Filaria smithi Sambon, 1907
- Filaria terebra Diesing, 1851
- Filaria tuberculata von Linstow, 1877
- Filaria volvulans Railliet, 1893
- Filaria volvulas Leuckart, 1892
- Filaria volvulus Leuckart, 1892
- Filaria volvulxus Manson, 1893
