= Anton Schneider =

German zoologist

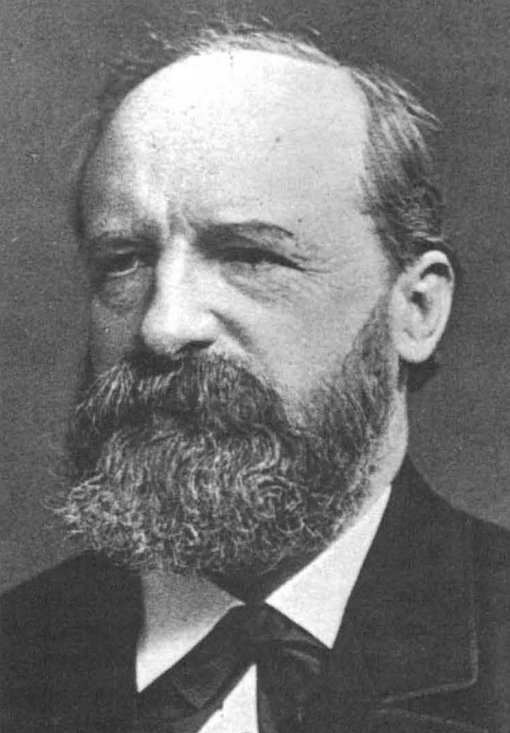

Friedrich Anton Schneider (3 July 1831 – 30 May 1890) was a German zoologist who was among the first to examine and describe mitotic nuclear division with observations on what would later be called chromosomes. He served as a professor at the University of Giessen and at the University of Wroclaw.

Schneider was born in Zeitz, the son of merchant Karl Friedrich and his wife Friederike Wilhelmine Müller. He studied at the local gymnasium and after his mother died, his father remarried. His father took him on his travels and sparked an interest in literature and arts. He joined the University of Bonn where he studied mathematics and the natural sciences. Influenced by the teaching of Johannes Müller he moved to zoology, and accompanied Müller on a trip to Norway in 1855. On the return journey, their ship sank and a fellow student was drowned. He then went to the University of Berlin for his doctoral studies. He then returned to Zeitz to help his family following the death of his family. After habilitation from the University of Berlin in 1859 he became a Privatdozent and was in charge of the nematode collections in the museum. He regularly worked at the research station at Heligoland collaborating with Nathaniel Pringsheim. In 1869 he became a professor of at the University of Giessen, succeeding Rudolf Leuckart. He moved to the University of Breslau in 1881.

Schneider's main studies were on platyhelminths and his main studies were on Mesostomum as it was relatively transparent. In 1873 he described the process of nuclear division and egg cleavage in Mesostomum ehrenbergii.
